= Lethia =

Lethia is the scientific name of two genera of organisms and may refer to:

- Lethia (moth), a genus of moths in the family Sphingidae, currently treated as a synonym of Sphinx
- Lethia (plant), a genus of plants in the family Iridaceae
