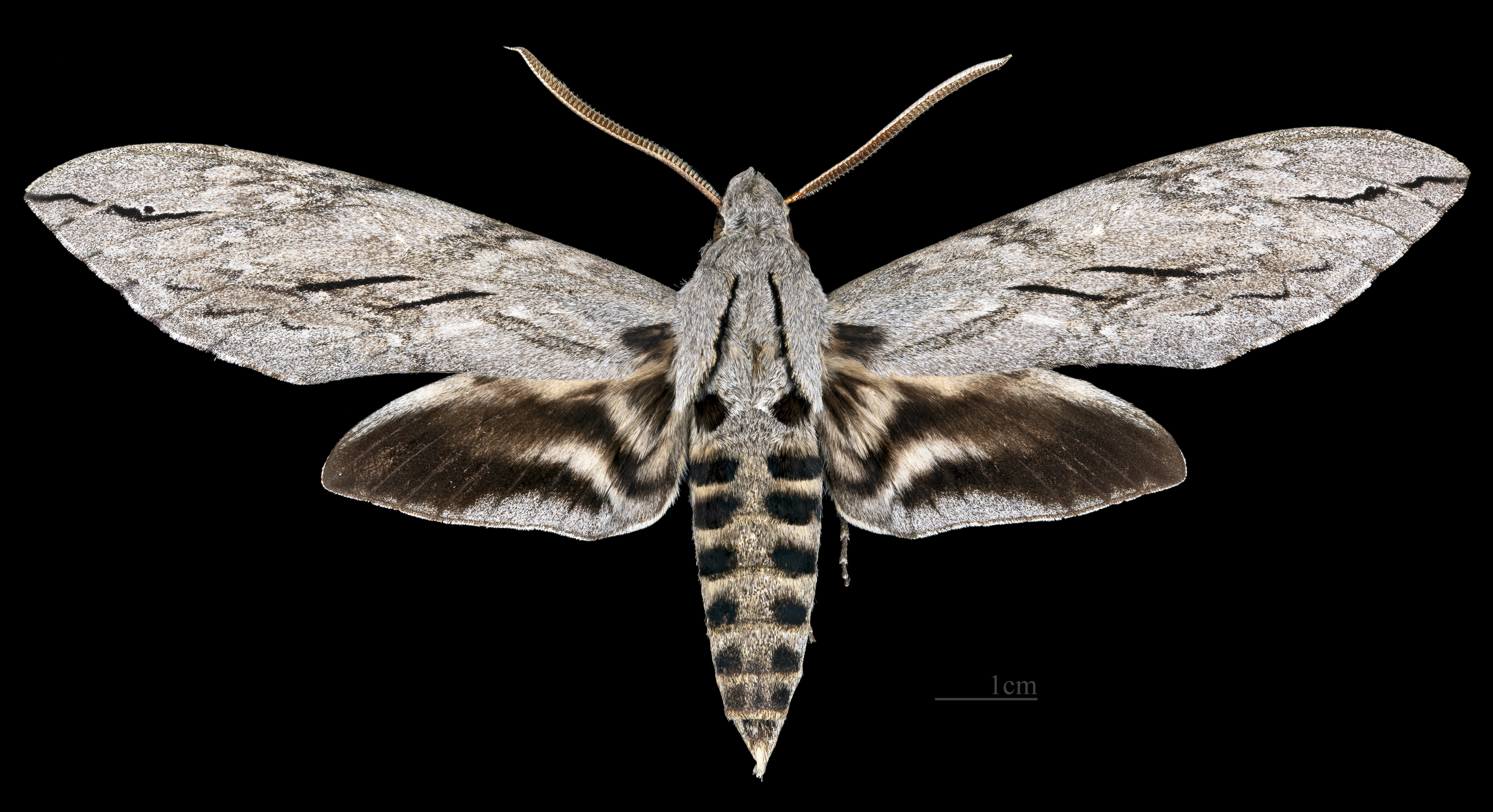
- Sphinx leucophaeata ♂
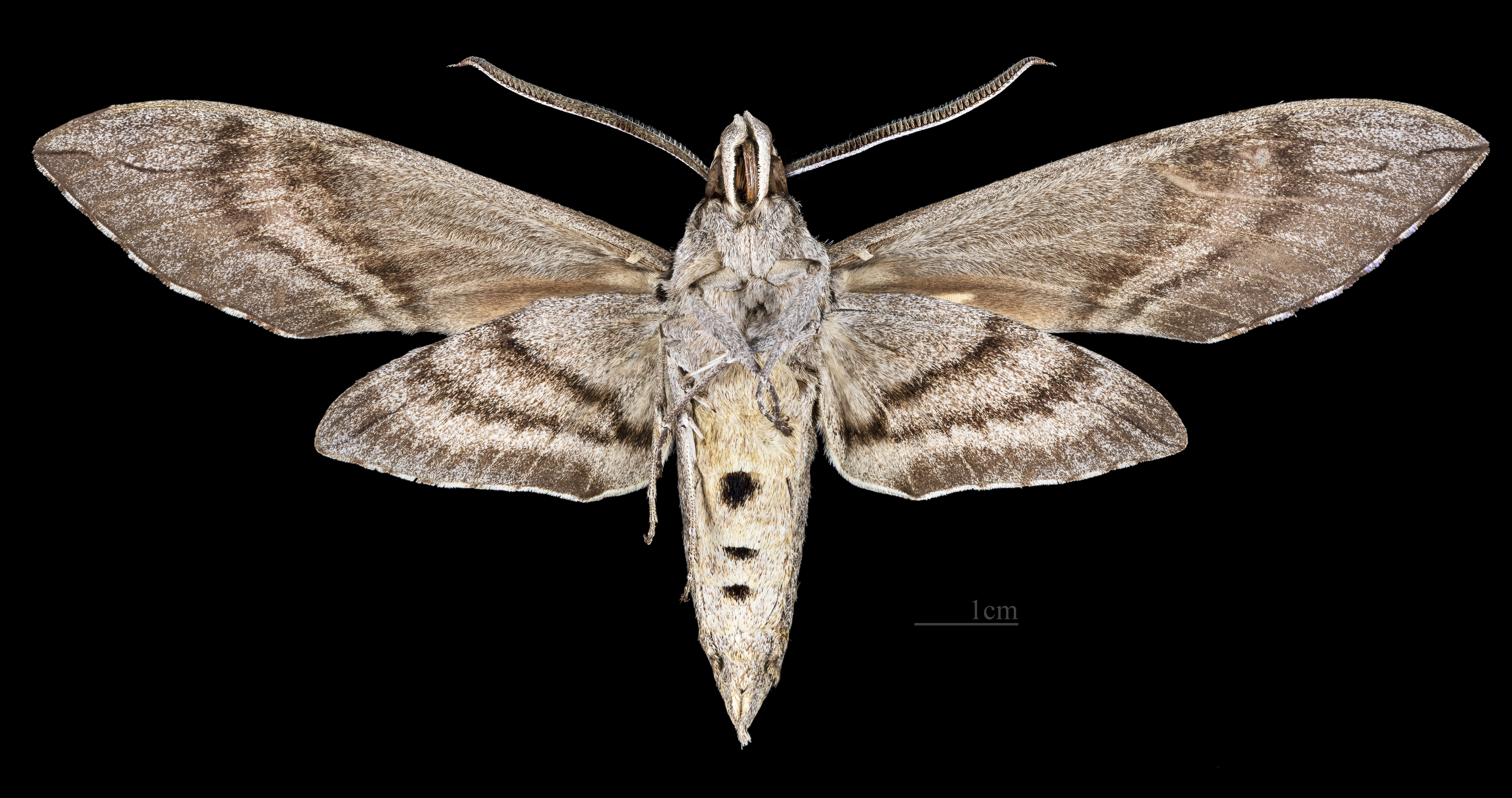
- Sphinx leucophaeata ♂ △

Scientific classification
- Domain: Eukaryota
- Kingdom: Animalia
- Phylum: Arthropoda
- Class: Insecta
- Order: Lepidoptera
- Family: Sphingidae
- Genus: Sphinx
- Species: S. leucophaeata

Binomial name
- Sphinx leucophaeata Clemens, 1859

Synonyms
- Sphinx lanceolata Boisduval, 1870; Sphinx aequinoctialis Boisduval, 1870

= Sphinx leucophaeata =

Species of moth

Sphinx leucophaeata is a moth of the family Sphingidae.

== Distribution ==
It is known from north-western Mexico with an occasional stray into Texas.

== Description ==
The length of the forewings is 62–75 mm.

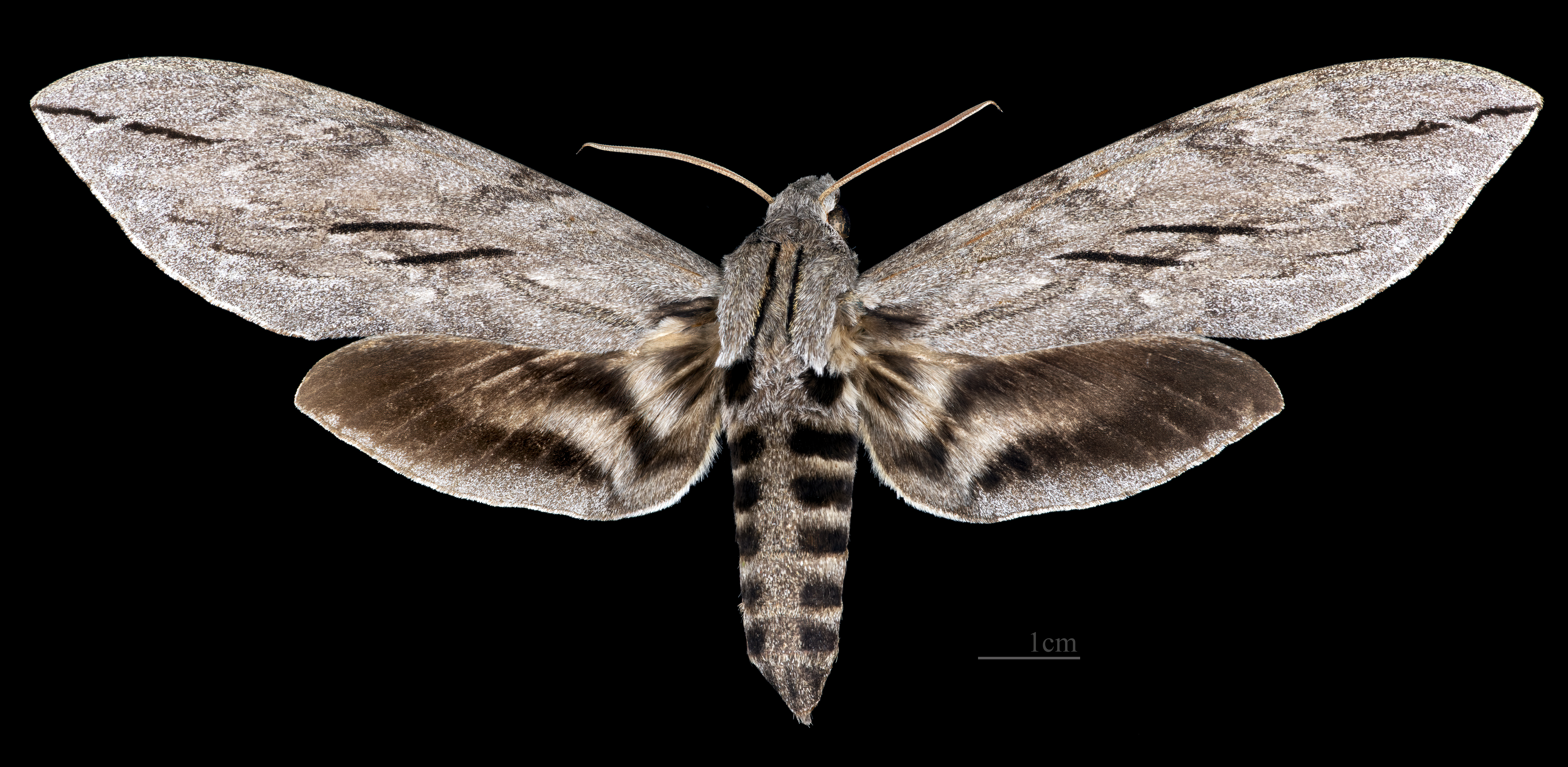
Sphinx leucophaeata ♀

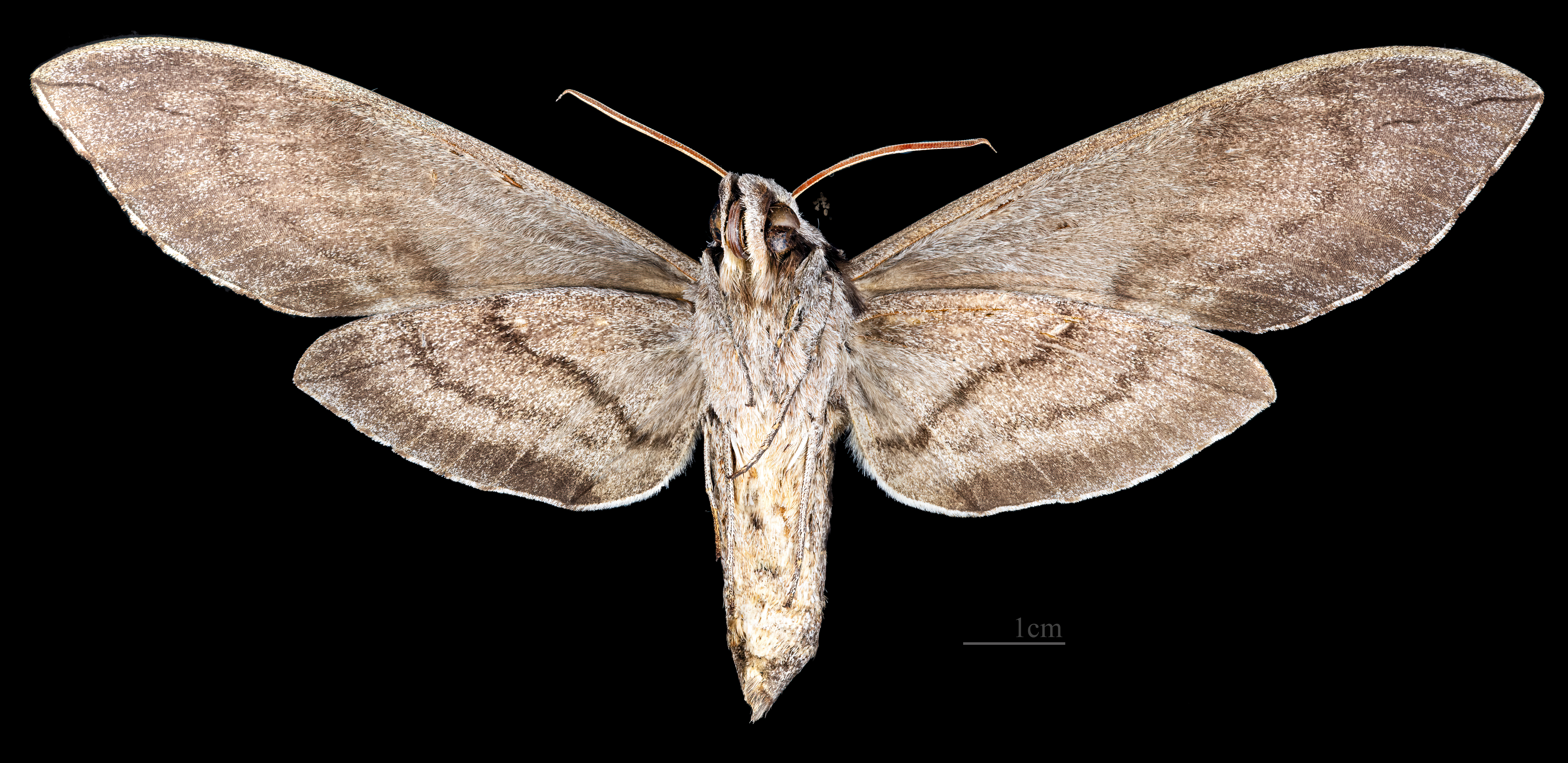
Sphinx leucophaeata ♀ △

== Biology ==
There is probably one generation per year with adults on wing from late June to early August.
