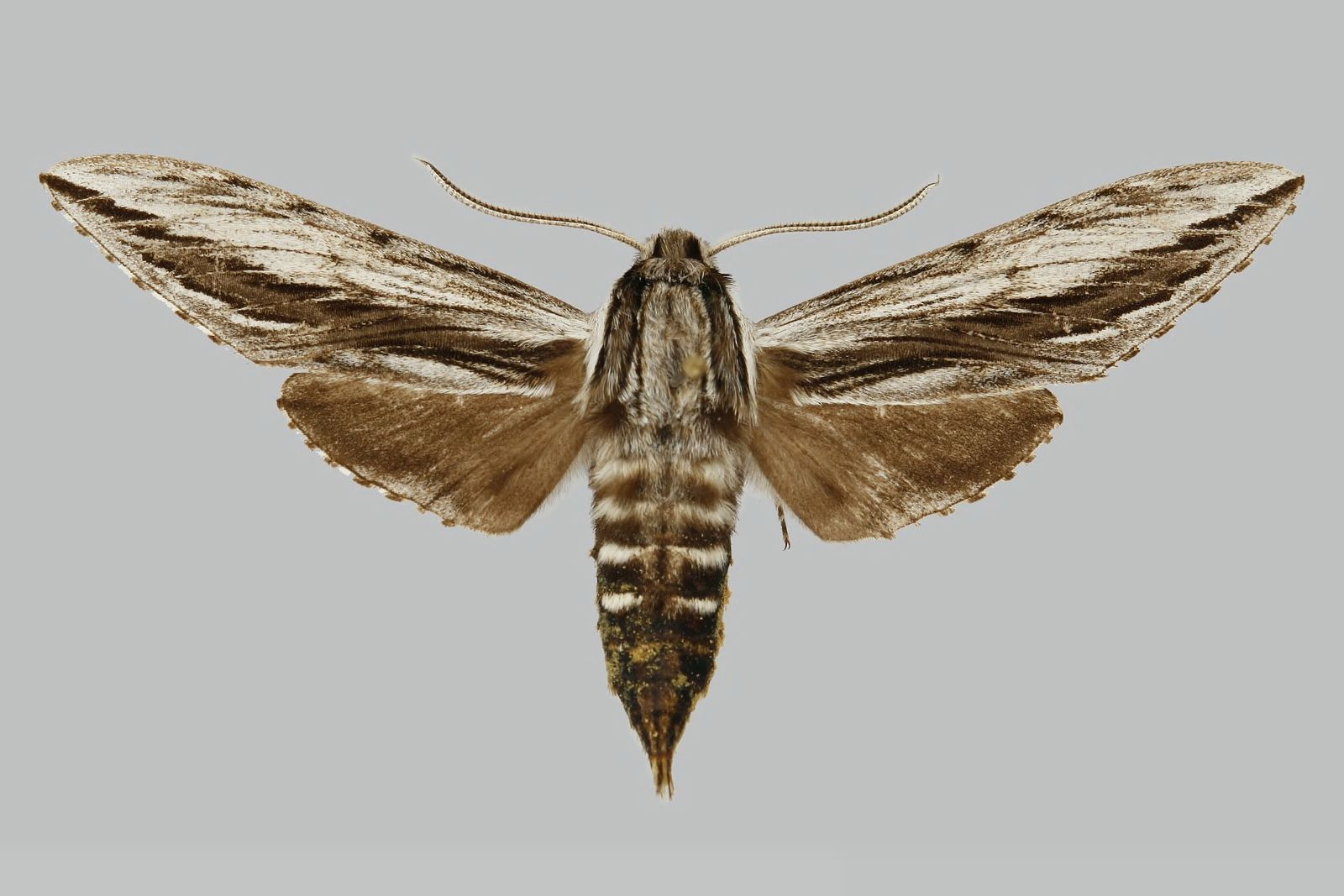
- Sphinx nogueirai, male, upperside.

Scientific classification
- Domain: Eukaryota
- Kingdom: Animalia
- Phylum: Arthropoda
- Class: Insecta
- Order: Lepidoptera
- Family: Sphingidae
- Genus: Sphinx
- Species: S. nogueirai

Binomial name
- Sphinx nogueirai Haxaire, 2002

= Sphinx nogueirai =

Species of moth

Sphinx nogueirai is a moth of the family Sphingidae. It is known from Sonora in Mexico.
