= Sphinx adumbrata =

Scientific classification
- Domain: Eukaryota
- Kingdom: Animalia
- Phylum: Arthropoda
- Class: Insecta
- Order: Lepidoptera
- Family: Sphingidae
- Genus: Sphinx
- Species: S. adumbrata

Binomial name
- Sphinx adumbrata (Dyar, 1912)

Synonyms
- Hyloicus adumbrata Dyar, 1912

Species of moth

Sphinx adumbrata is a moth of the family Sphingidae. It is known from Mexico.

The thorax upperside, head upperside and palpi are grey. There is a narrow, black mesial line on the abdomen upperside with five elliptical, pale yellow spots. The abdomen underside is grey with a mesial black line. The forewing upperside is also grey, with a black basal patch on the hind margin and a black line in the discal cell. The hindwing upperside is grey with diffuse, dark, basal mesial and submarginal bands.
