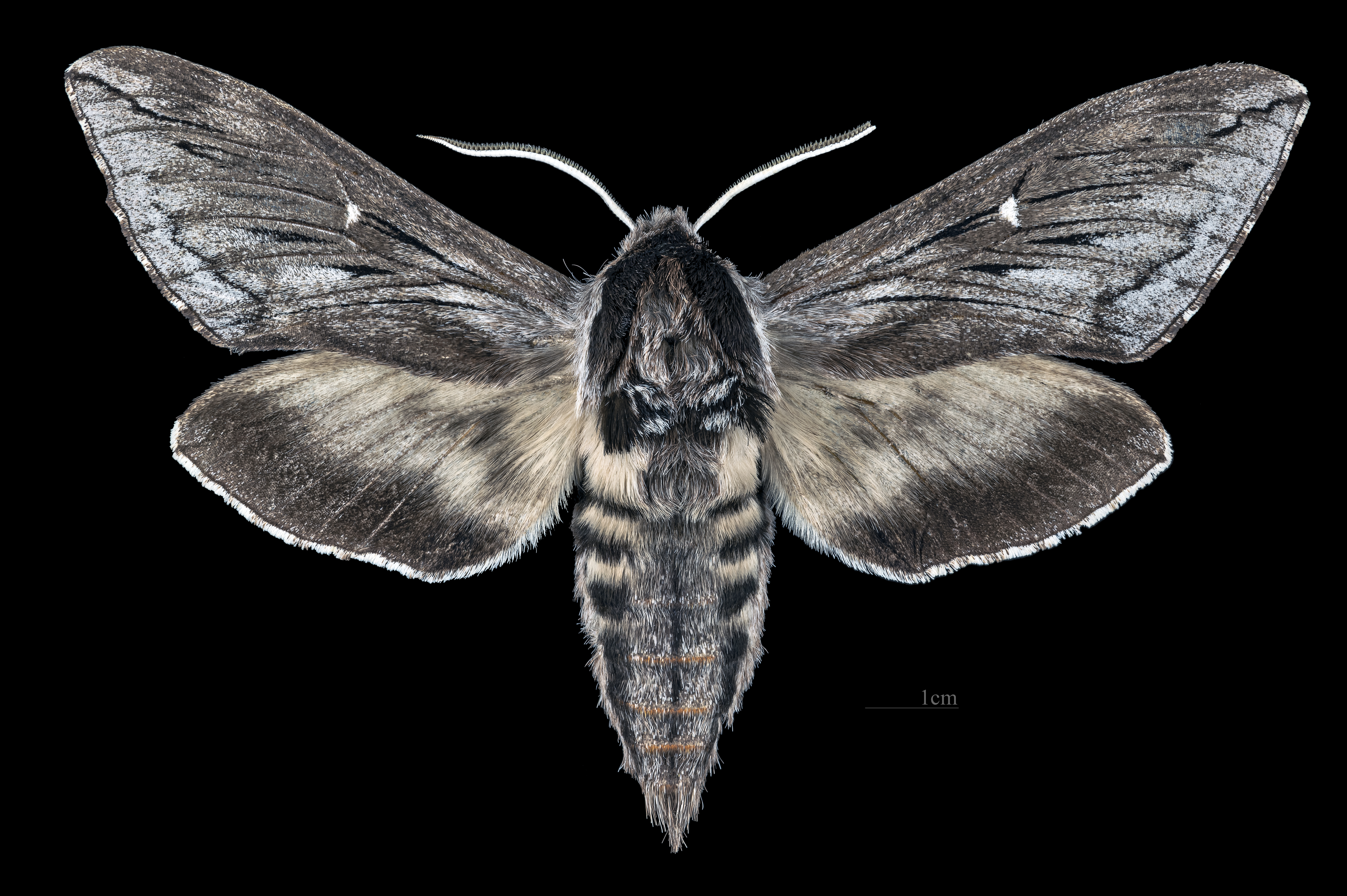
- Male dorsal view
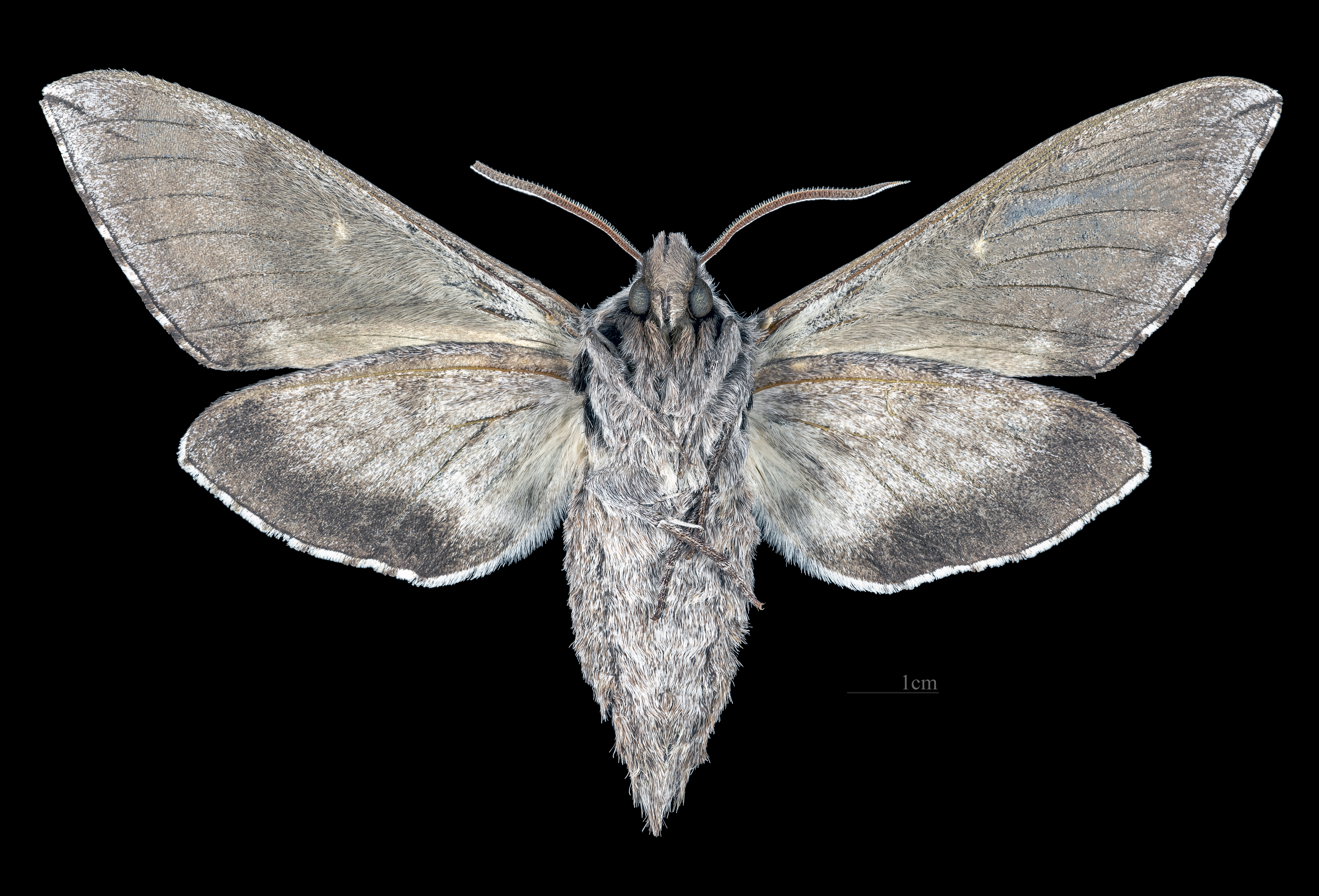
- Male ventral view

Scientific classification
- Kingdom: Animalia
- Phylum: Arthropoda
- Clade: Pancrustacea
- Class: Insecta
- Order: Lepidoptera
- Family: Sphingidae
- Genus: Sphinx
- Species: S. gordius

Binomial name
- Sphinx gordius Cramer, 1780

Synonyms
- Sphinx gordius campestris McDunnough, 1931; Hyloicus gordius oslari Rothschild & Jordan, 1903

= Sphinx gordius =

Apple sphinx

Species of moth

Sphinx gordius, the apple sphinx or Gordian sphinx, is a moth of the family Sphingidae. The species was first described by Pieter Cramer in 1780.

== Distribution ==
It is found in the northern parts of the United States and southern Canada, mostly east of the Rocky Mountains, additionally it is found along the east coast to Florida and in the Rocky Mountains to Colorado.

== Description ==
The wingspan is 68–108 mm.

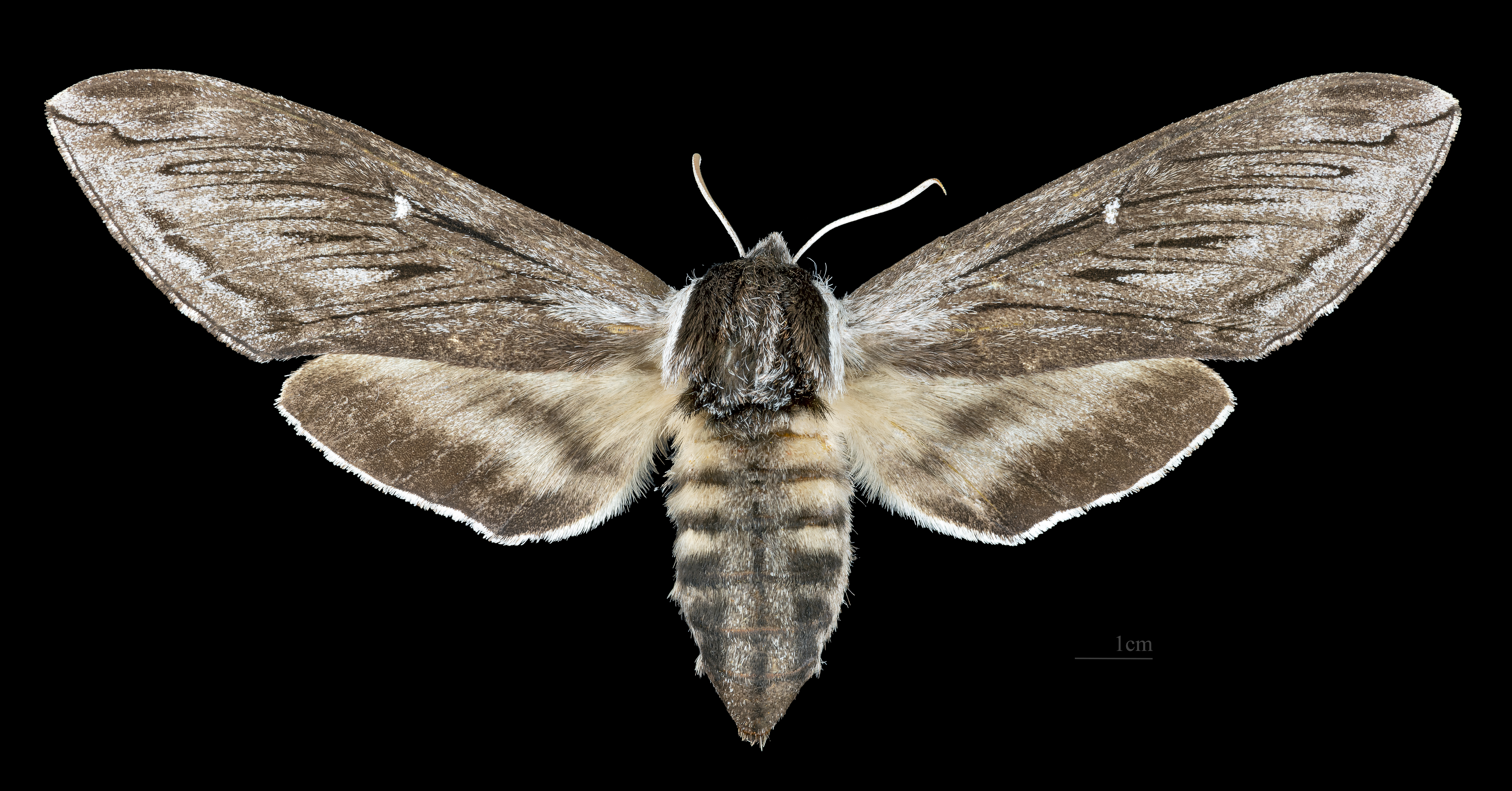
Female dorsal view

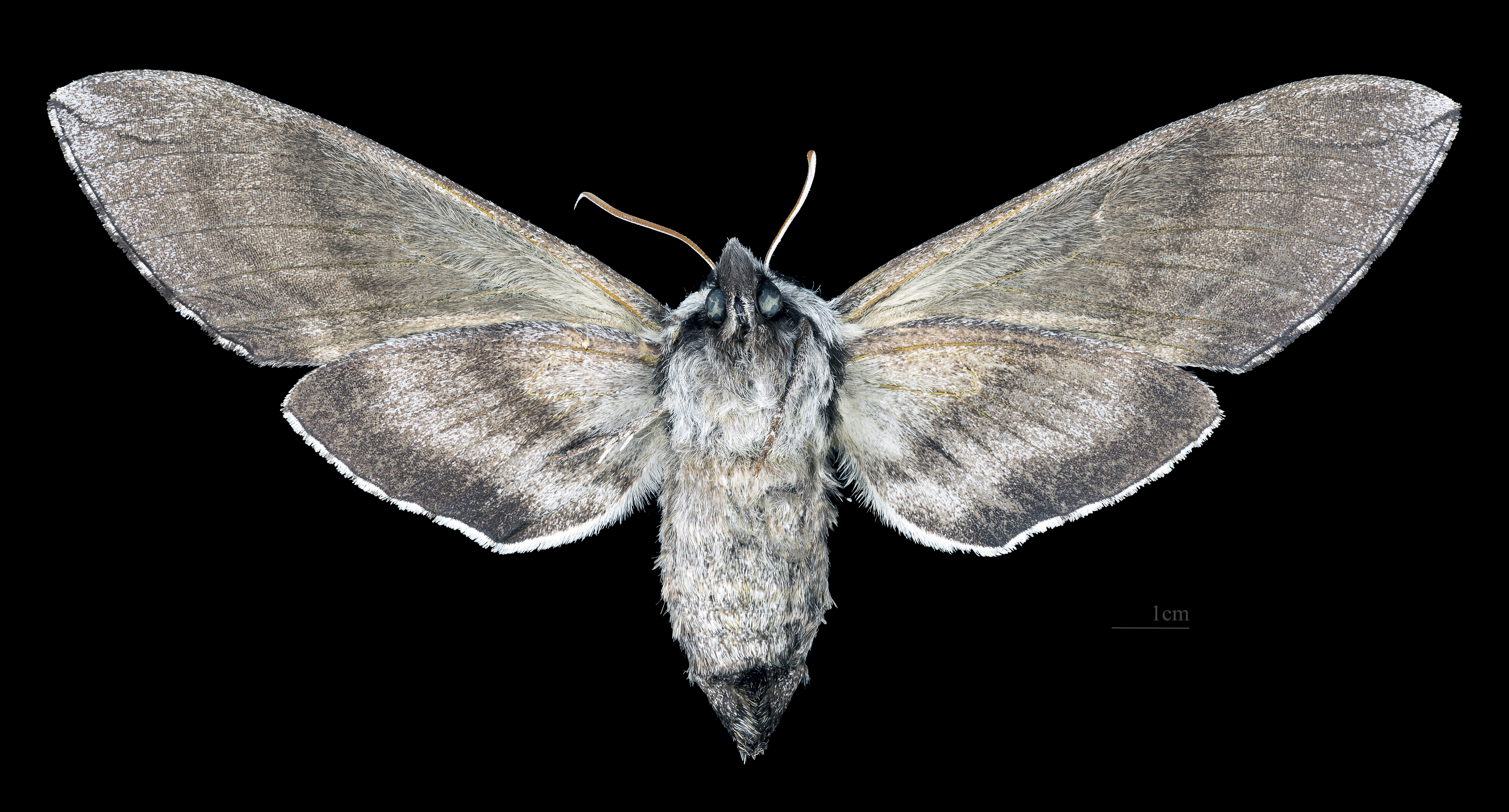
Female ventral view

== Biology ==
The larvae feed on Malus, Rosa, Vaccinium and Fraxinus species.

== Subspecies ==
- Sphinx gordius gordius
- Sphinx gordius oslari (Rothschild & Jordan, 1903) (Colorado)
