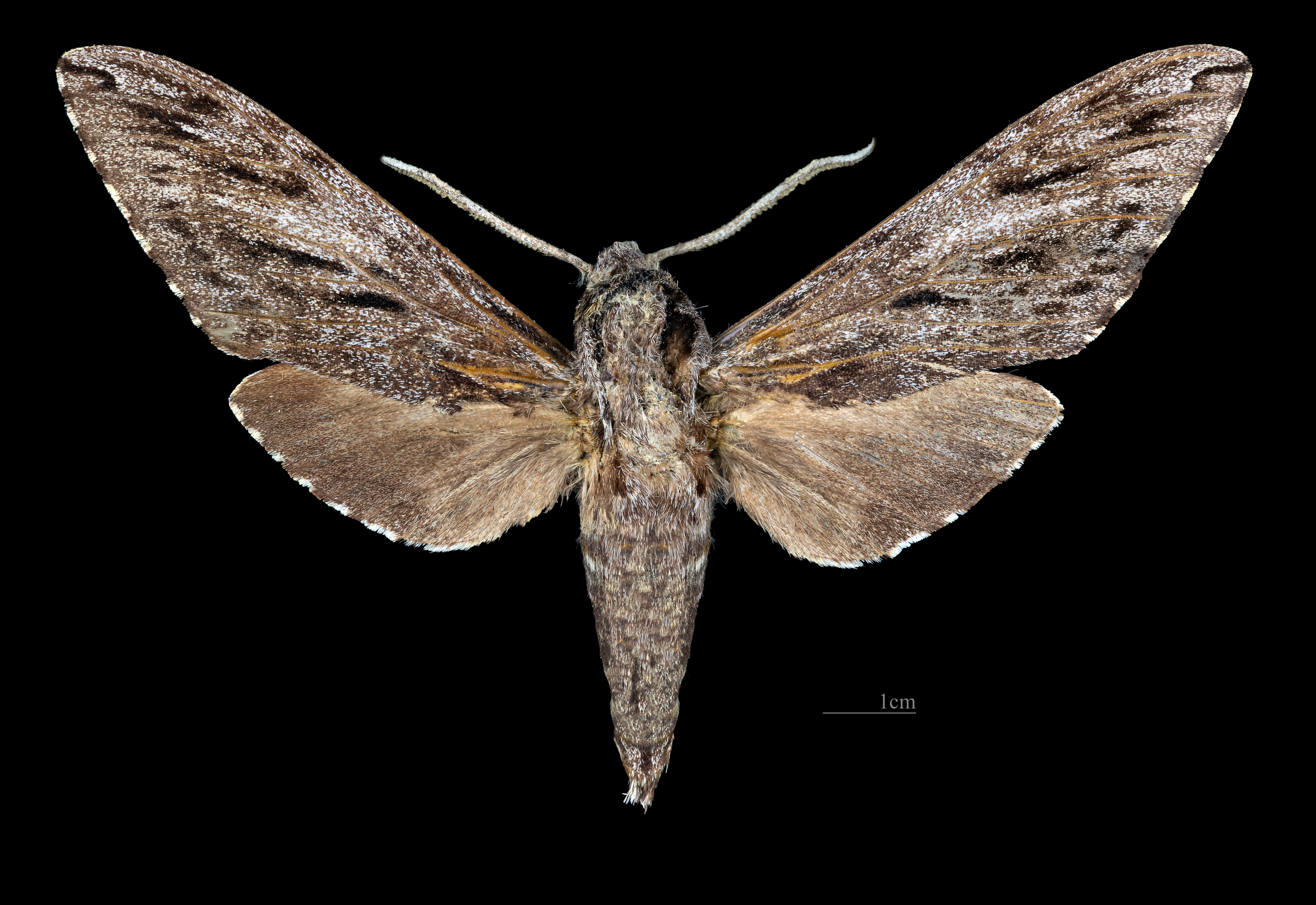
- Male dorsal
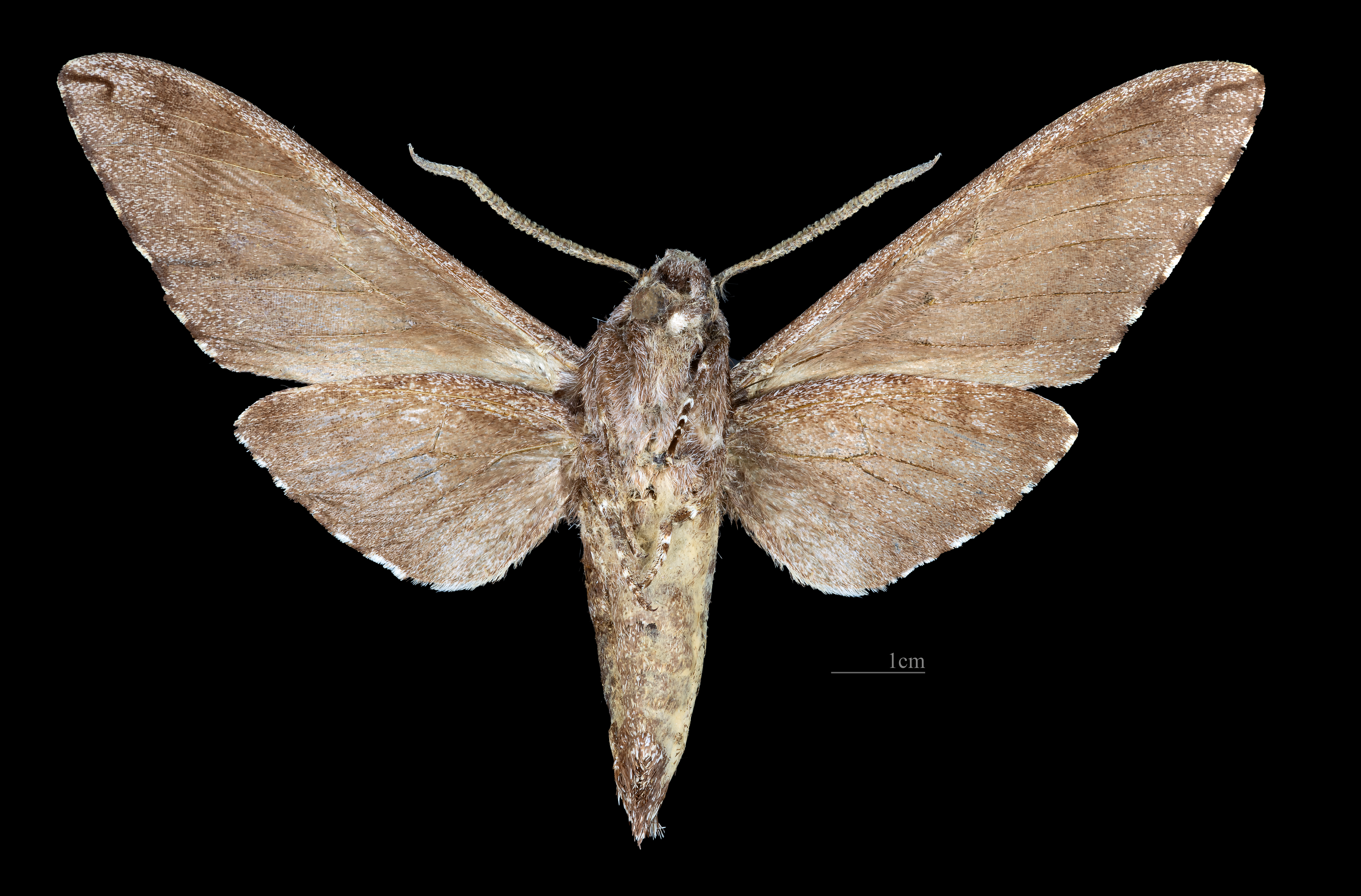
- Male ventral

Scientific classification
- Kingdom: Animalia
- Phylum: Arthropoda
- Class: Insecta
- Order: Lepidoptera
- Family: Sphingidae
- Genus: Sphinx
- Species: S. formosana

Binomial name
- Sphinx formosana Riotte, 1970

Synonyms
- Hyloicus formosana (Riotte, 1970)

= Sphinx formosana =

Species of moth

Sphinx formosana is a moth of the family Sphingidae. It is endemic to Taiwan and known from the northern central mountains at elevations above 2,000 m (6,600 ft).

The wingspan is 68–75 mm (2.7–3.0 in). Adults are active in June–July.
