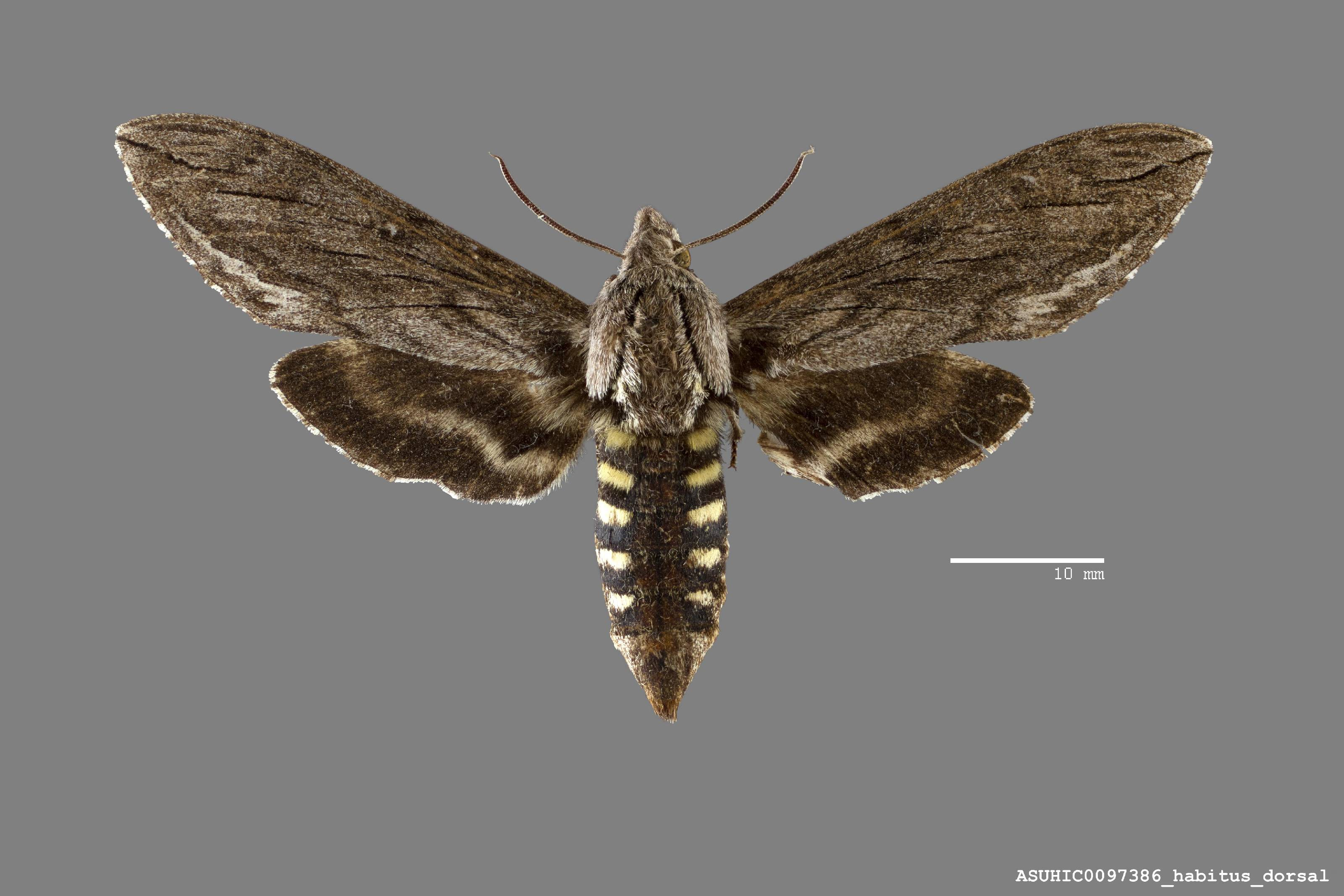

Scientific classification
- Domain: Eukaryota
- Kingdom: Animalia
- Phylum: Arthropoda
- Class: Insecta
- Order: Lepidoptera
- Family: Sphingidae
- Genus: Sphinx
- Species: S. chisoya

Binomial name
- Sphinx chisoya (Schaus, 1932)

Synonyms
- Hyloicus chisoya Schaus, 1932

= Sphinx chisoya =

Chisoya sphinx

Species of moth

Sphinx chisoya, the chisoya sphinx, is a moth of the family Sphingidae. It is known from tropical and subtropical lowlands from southern Texas to Mexico.

The wingspan is 70–82 mm.
