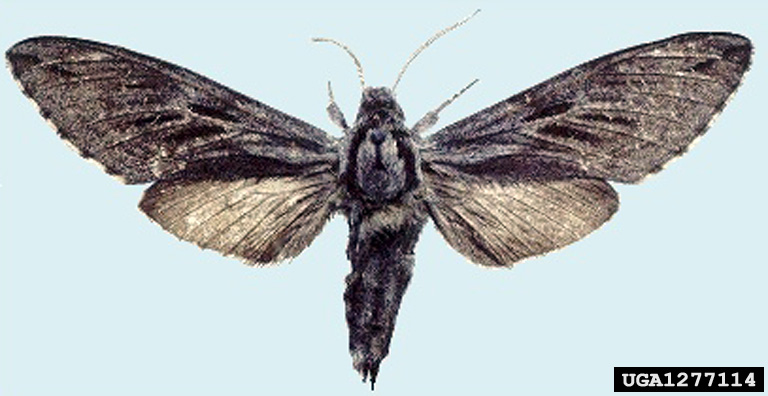

Scientific classification
- Domain: Eukaryota
- Kingdom: Animalia
- Phylum: Arthropoda
- Class: Insecta
- Order: Lepidoptera
- Family: Sphingidae
- Genus: Sphinx
- Species: S. morio

Binomial name
- Sphinx morio (Rothschild & Jordan, 1903)

Synonyms
- Hyloicus morio Rothschild & Jordan, 1903; Sphinx laricis Rozkhov, 1972; Hyloicus morio inouei Owada & Kogi, 1992; Hyloicus morio arestus Jordan, 1931; Hyloicus morio heilongjiangensis Zhao & Zhang, 1992; Sphinx caligineus hakodoensis O. Bang-Haas, 1936

= Sphinx morio =

Larch hawk moth

Species of moth

Sphinx morio, the larch hawk moth or Asian pine hawkmoth, is a moth of the family Sphingidae. It is found in Russia, the Korean Peninsula, Japan and China.

The wingspan is 60–80 mm.

The larvae feed on Picea (including Picea asperata and Picea jezoensis), Larix (including Larix kaempferi, Larix sibirica, and Larix gmelinii var. olgensis), Pinus (including Pinus sibirica, Pinus sylvestris, Pinus koraiensis, Pinus densiflora, Pinus thunbergii and Pinus sylvestris var. mongolica) and Abies species (including Abies fabri). In the Altai, it can be a major pest of Pinus sylvestris, sometimes causing complete defoliation of large areas.

== Subspecies ==
- Sphinx morio morio (Honshu in Japan)
- Sphinx morio arestus (Jordan, 1931) (central Russia and the Altai eastward through Mongolia and northeastern China, to Primorskiy Kray, Sakhalin Island, the Korean Peninsula and Tsushima in Japan)
- Sphinx morio inouei (Owada & Kogi, 1992) (northern Hokkaido in Japan)
