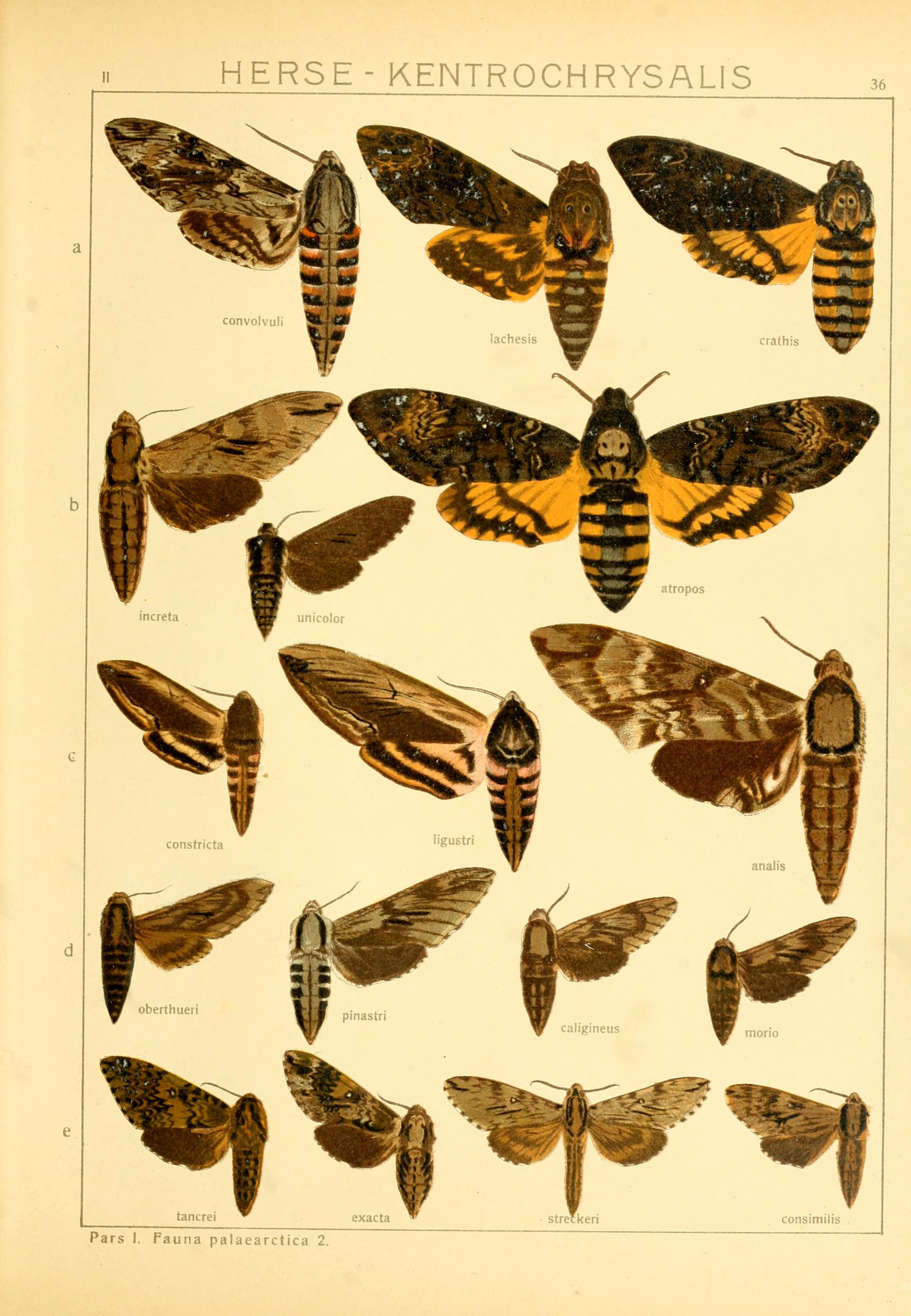
- Sphinx oberthueri in Seitz

Scientific classification
- Domain: Eukaryota
- Kingdom: Animalia
- Phylum: Arthropoda
- Class: Insecta
- Order: Lepidoptera
- Family: Sphingidae
- Genus: Sphinx
- Species: S. oberthueri

Binomial name
- Sphinx oberthueri (Rothschild & Jordan, 1903)

Synonyms
- Hyloicus oberthueri Rothschild & Jordan, 1903; Sphinx jordani Mell, 1922; Sphinx thailandica Inoue, 1991

= Sphinx oberthueri =

Species of moth

Sphinx oberthueri is a moth of the family Sphingidae. It is found from central and south-western China to northern Thailand.

The larvae feed on Pinus massoniana in Yunnan.
