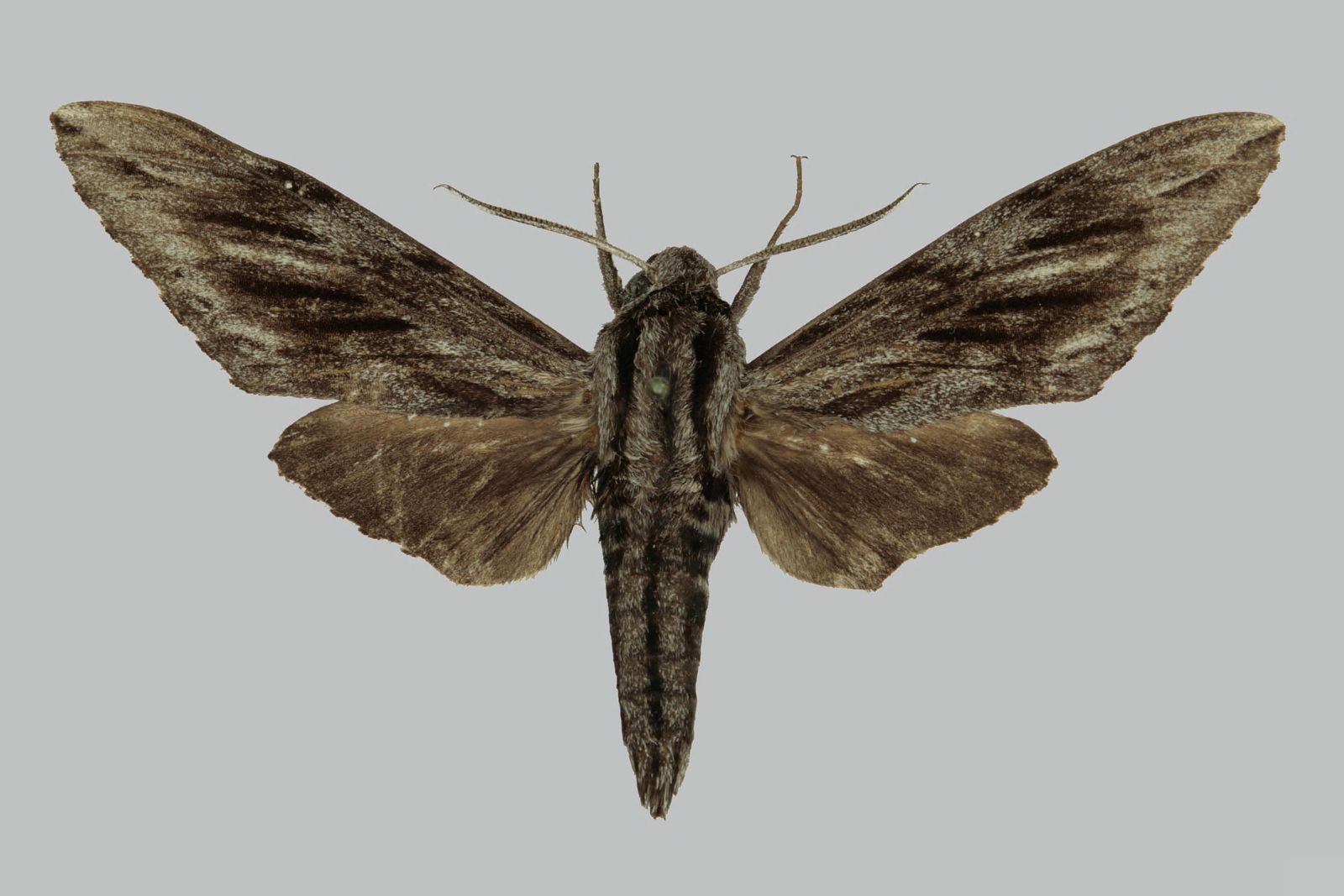

Scientific classification
- Kingdom: Animalia
- Phylum: Arthropoda
- Clade: Pancrustacea
- Class: Insecta
- Order: Lepidoptera
- Family: Sphingidae
- Genus: Sphinx
- Species: S. centrosinaria

Binomial name
- Sphinx centrosinaria Kitching & Jin 1998

= Sphinx centrosinaria =

Species of moth

Sphinx centrosinaria is a moth of the family Sphingidae. It is known from Sichuan, Yunnan and Tibet in southern China.
