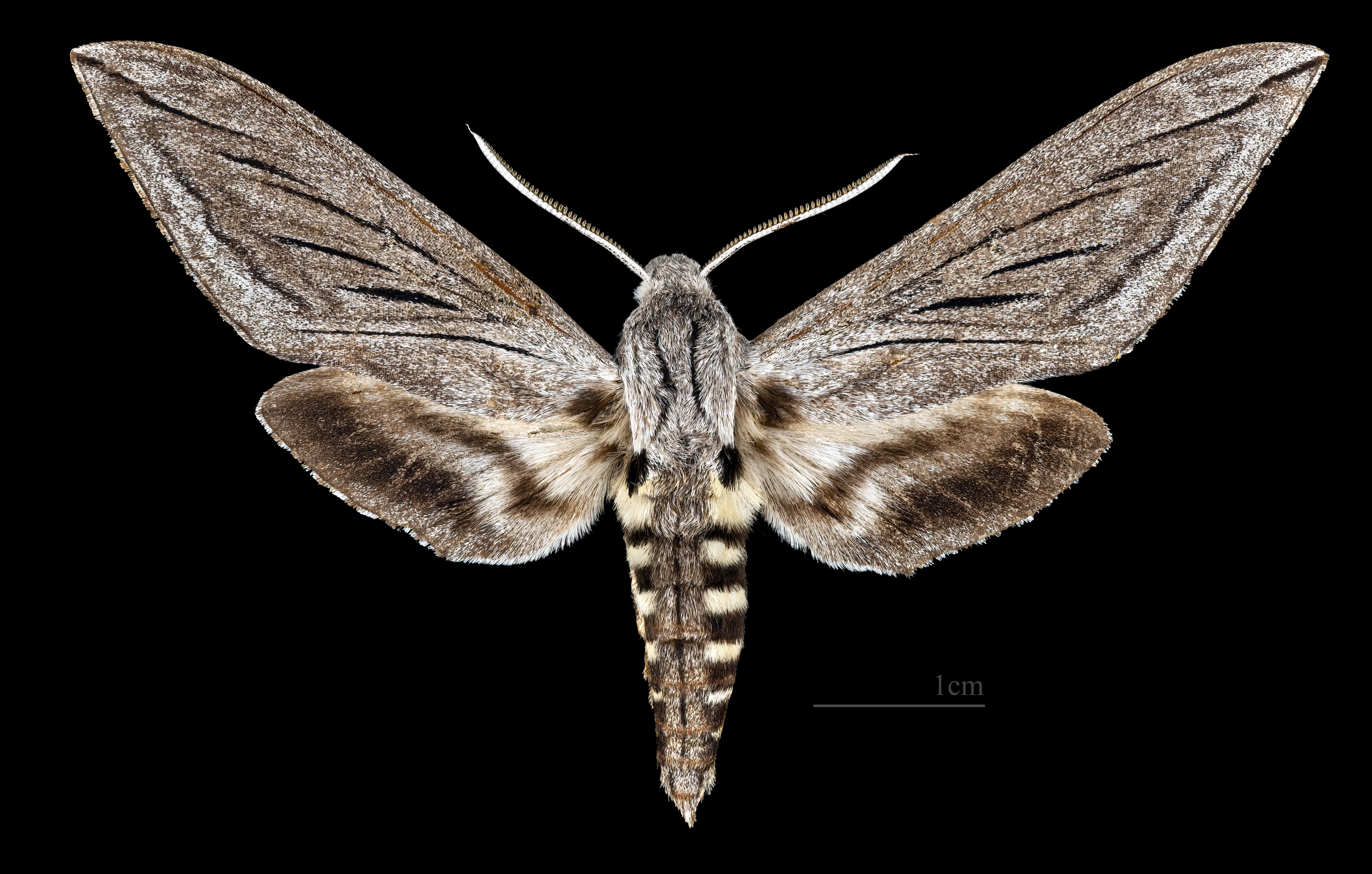
- Sphinx asella ♂
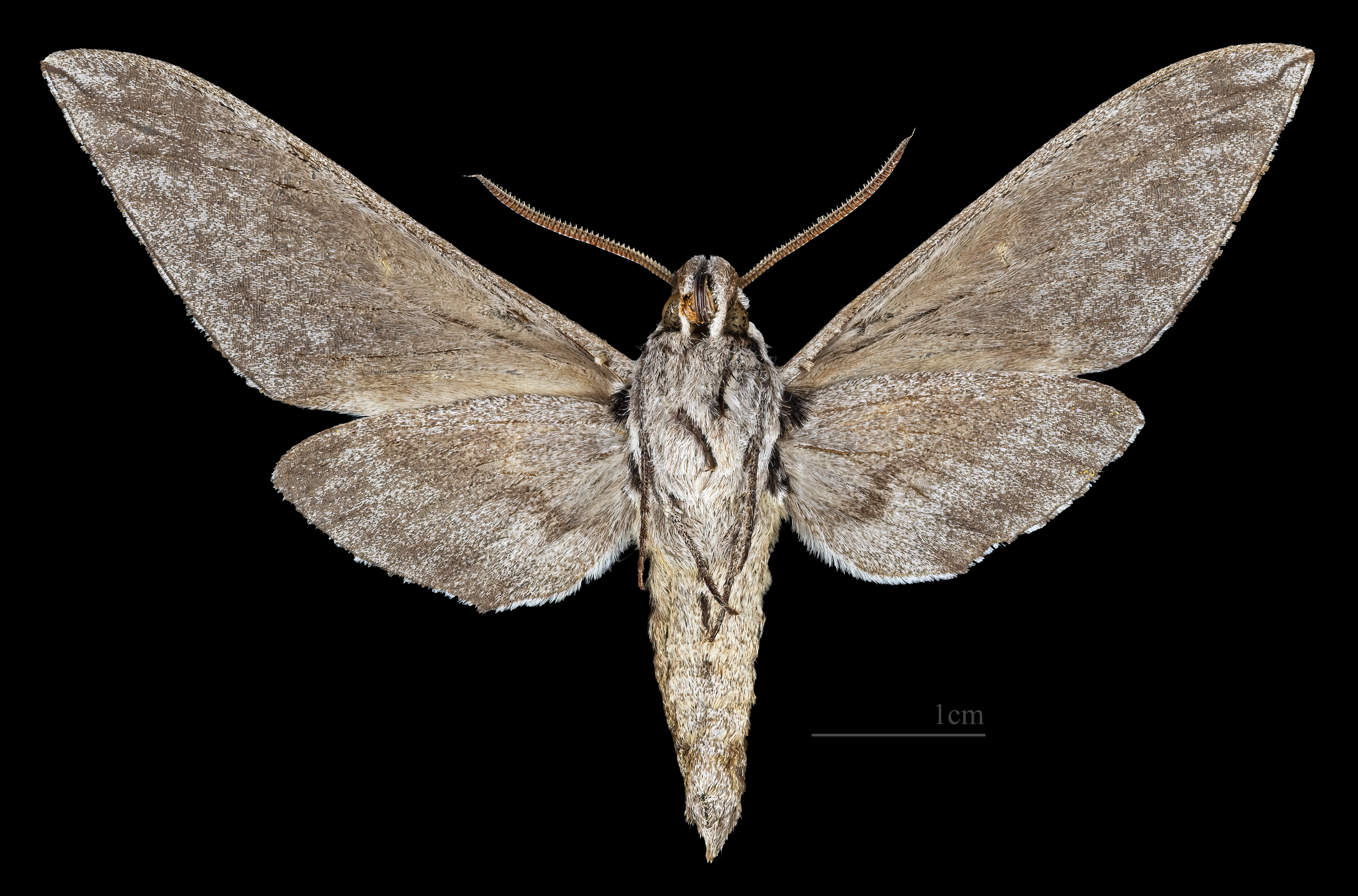
- Sphinx asella ♂ △

Scientific classification
- Domain: Eukaryota
- Kingdom: Animalia
- Phylum: Arthropoda
- Class: Insecta
- Order: Lepidoptera
- Family: Sphingidae
- Genus: Sphinx
- Species: S. asellus

Binomial name
- Sphinx asellus (Rothschild & Jordan, 1903)

Synonyms
- Hyloicus asellus Rothschild & Jordan, 1903

= Sphinx asellus =

Asellus sphinx moth

Species of moth

Sphinx asellus, the asellus sphinx moth, is a moth of the family Sphingidae. The species was first described by Walter Rothschild and Karl Jordan in 1903. It is known from pinyon-juniper woodland and similar arid areas in the US states of Colorado, Nevada, Utah, extreme south-western Wyoming, Arizona, New Mexico and south-western Texas.

The wingspan is 80–99 mm. There is one generation per year with adults on wing from May to July.

The larvae feed on manzanita species.
