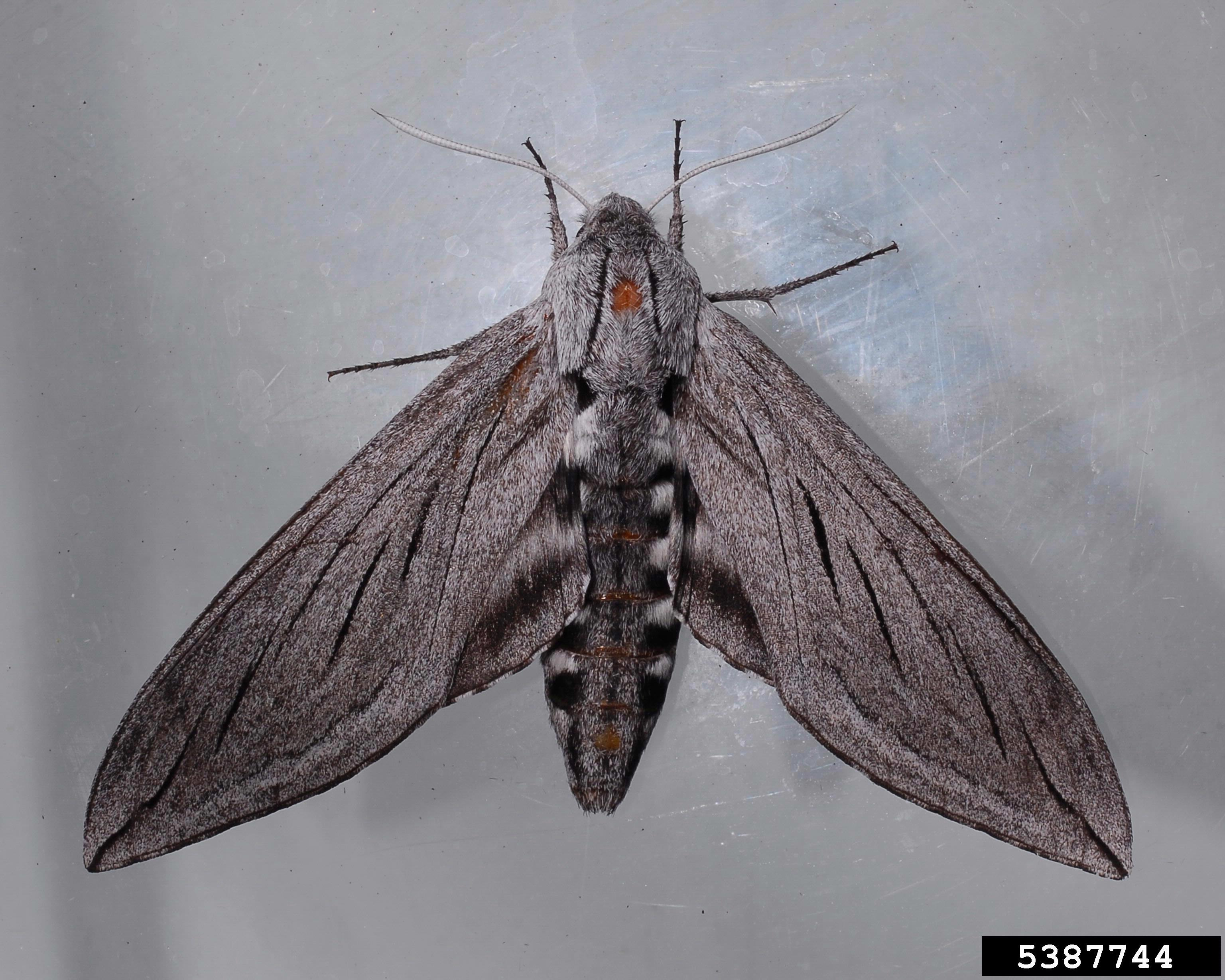

Scientific classification
- Domain: Eukaryota
- Kingdom: Animalia
- Phylum: Arthropoda
- Class: Insecta
- Order: Lepidoptera
- Family: Sphingidae
- Genus: Sphinx
- Species: S. chersis

Binomial name
- Sphinx chersis (Hübner, 1823)

Synonyms
- Lethia chersis Hübner, 1823; Sphinx cinerea Harris, 1839; Sphinx oreodaphne Edwards, 1873; Hyloicus chersis pallescens Rothschild & Jordan, 1903

= Sphinx chersis =

Great ash sphinx

Species of moth

Sphinx chersis, the great ash sphinx or northern ash sphinx, is a moth that belongs to the family Sphingidae.

== Appearance ==
This insect has a large wing span (90 to 130 mm). The upperside of the forewing is soft dark gray to blue gray with a series of black dashes, one of which reaches the wing tip. The upperside of the hindwing is black with blurry pale gray bands. The larva of this species is typically light green with blue dashes and a bluish-green horn, but there is also a red morph. Its appearance is very similar to that of others in the subfamily Sphinginae.

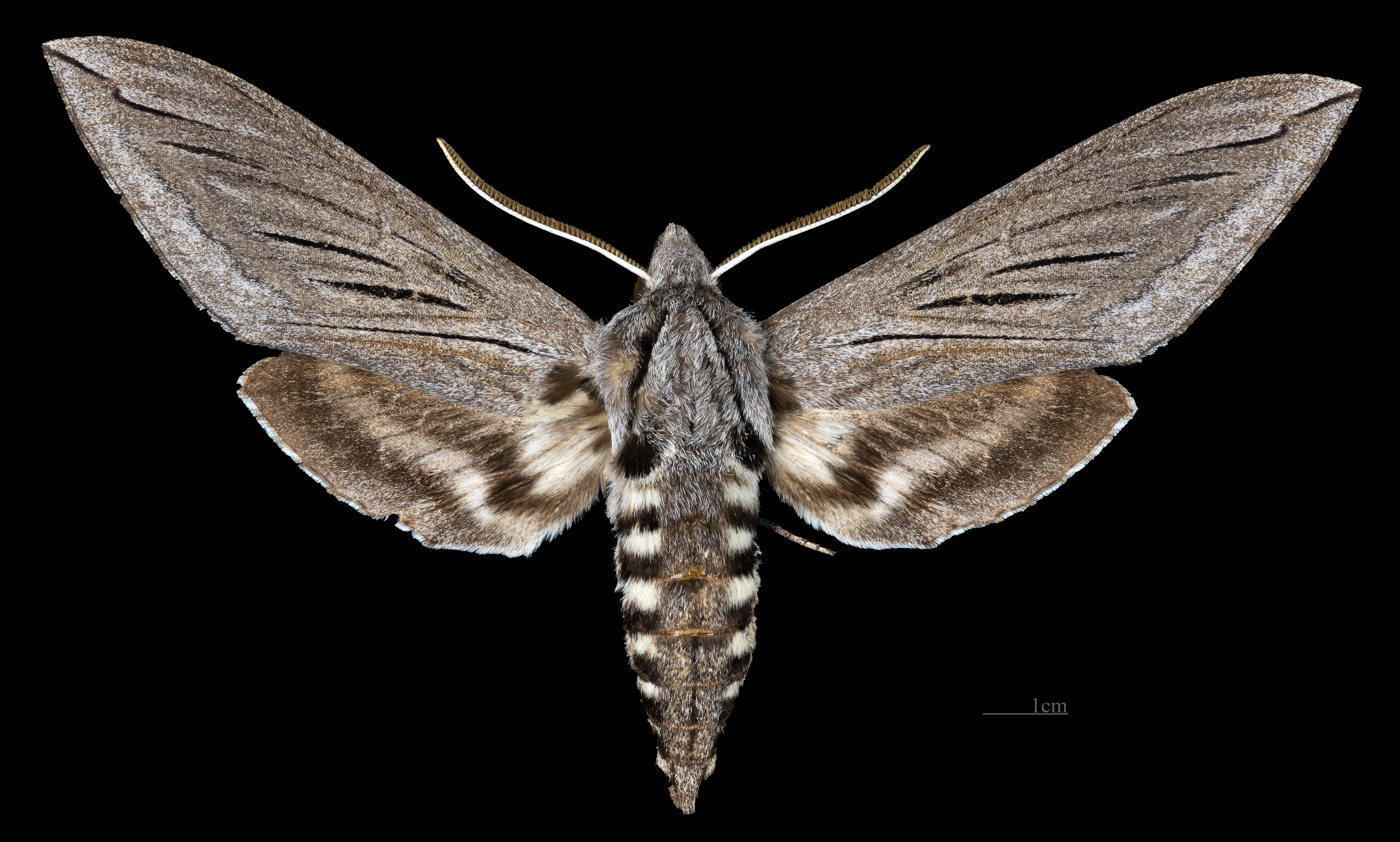
Sphinx chersis ♂

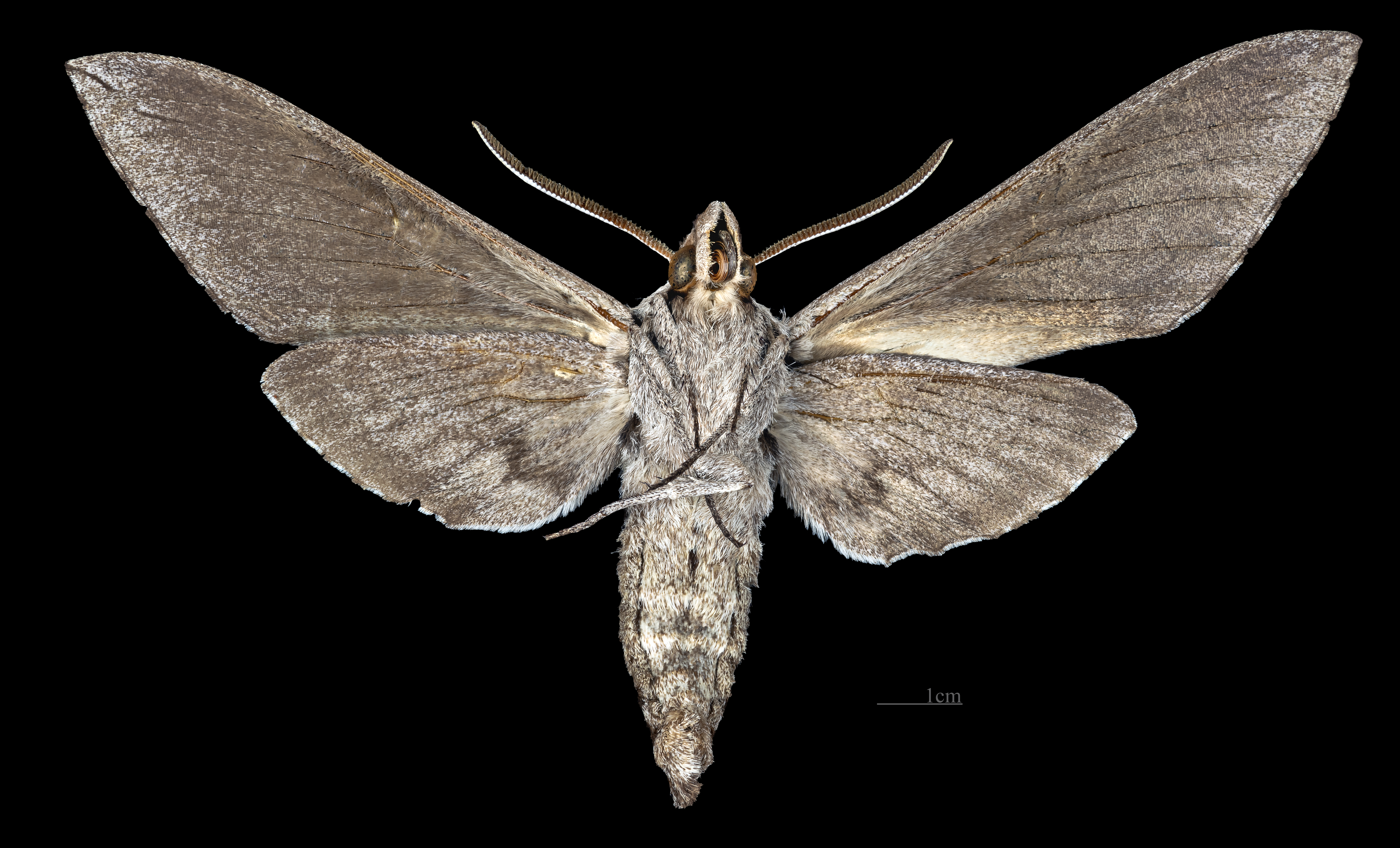
Sphinx chersis ♂ △

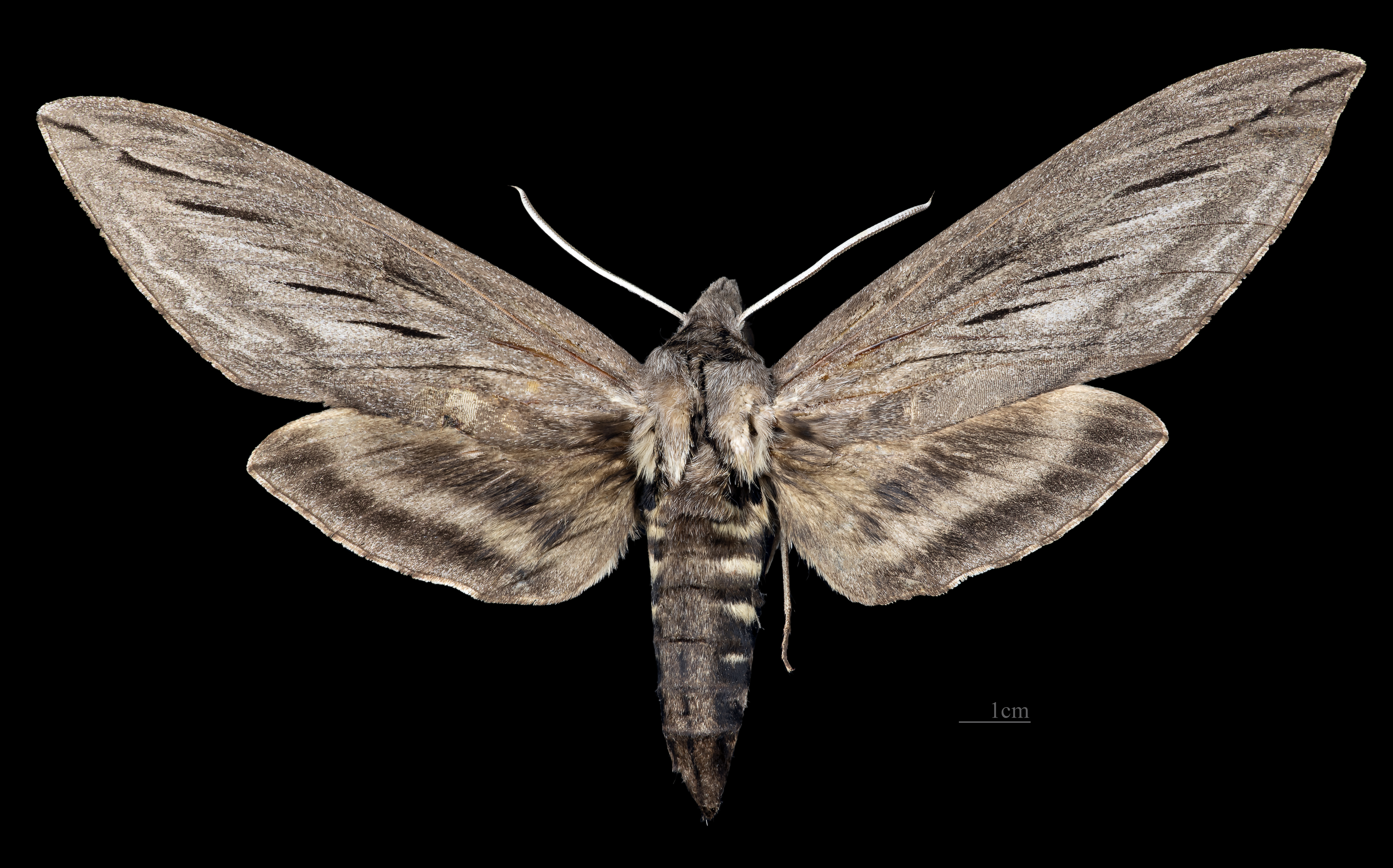
Sphinx chersis ♀

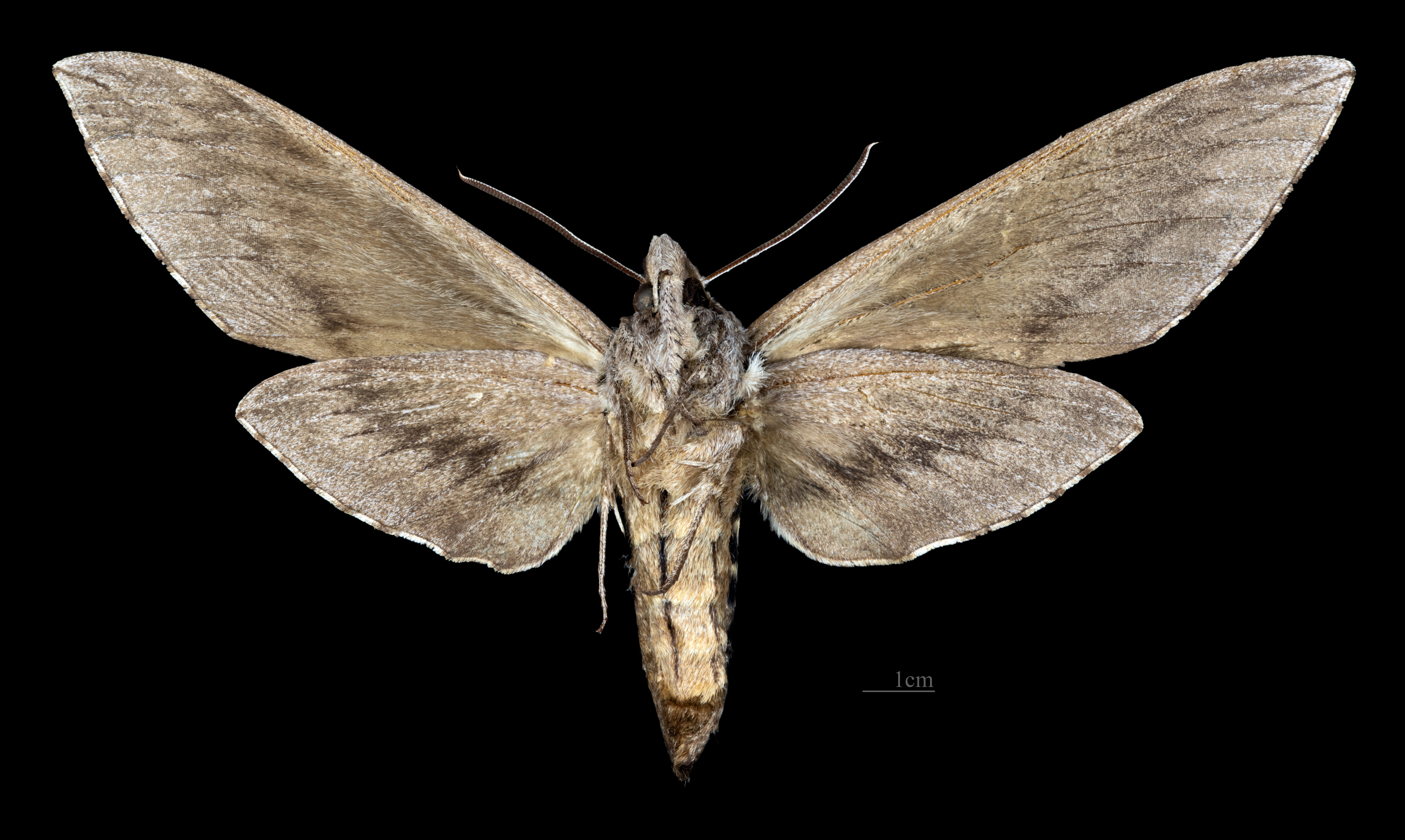
Sphinx chersis ♀ △

== Biology ==
Its larvae feed upon various plants in the olive family (Oleaceae) such as lilacs (Syringa spp.), ashes (Fraxinus spp.), and privet (Ligustrum vulgare). Mature caterpillars pupate in subterranean chambers when they have finished feeding, and here the pupae stay dormant until the next year. The moth emerges any time from May to August in the South, but is only found from June to July further north. Adults feed at dusk on deep-throated flowers and have been sighted at honeysuckles (Lonicera spp.), evening primroses (in the family Onagraceae), dogbane (Apocynum spp.), phlox (Phlox spp.), and bouncing bet (Saponaria officinalis).

== Distribution ==
This species occurs in northern Mexico and throughout most of the United States, wherever the larval hosts are present, though it is uncommon in the Gulf States.

== Subspecies ==
- Sphinx chersis chersis (from Mexico north through most of the United States)
- Sphinx chersis mexicanus Rothschild & Jordan, 1903 (Mexico)
