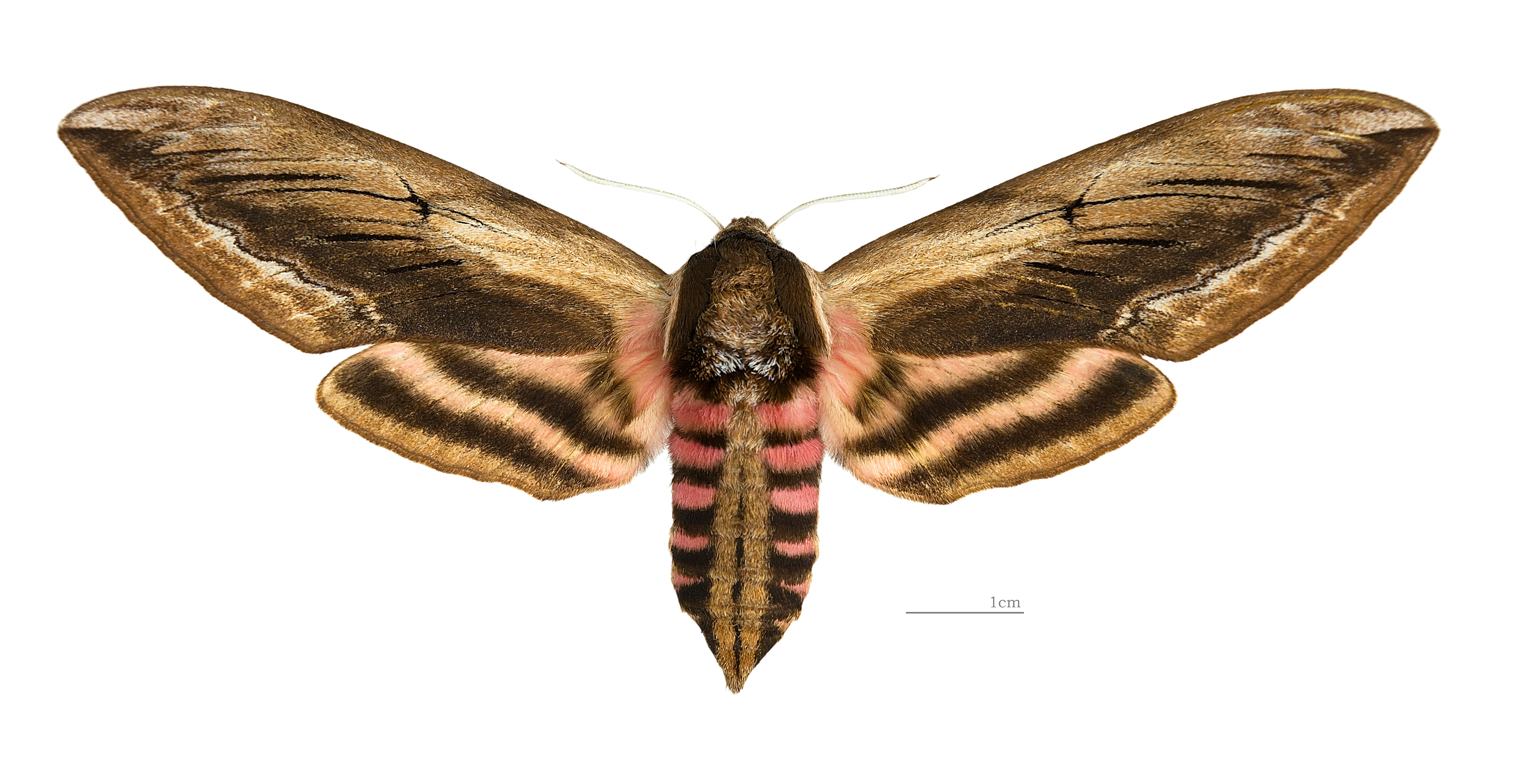
- Sphinx ligustri

Scientific classification
- Kingdom: Animalia
- Phylum: Arthropoda
- Class: Insecta
- Order: Lepidoptera
- Family: Sphingidae
- Tribe: Sphingini
- Genus: Sphinx; Linnaeus, 1758

Synonyms
- Spectrum Scopoli, 1777; Mesosphinx Cockerell, 1920; Lethia Hübner, 1819; Hyloicus Hübner, 1819; Hyloecus Kuznetsova, 1906; Hyloecus Agassiz, 1846; Herse Oken, 1815; Herse Agassiz, 1846; Gargantua Kirby, 1892

= Sphinx (genus) =

Genus of moths

Sphinx is a genus of moths in the family Sphingidae. The genus was erected by Carl Linnaeus in his 1758 10th edition of Systema Naturae.

== Species ==
- Sphinx adumbrata (Dyar, 1912)
- Sphinx asellus (Rothschild & Jordan, 1903)
- Sphinx caligineus (Butler, 1877)
- Sphinx canadensis (Boisduval, 1875)
- Sphinx centrosinaria Kitching & Jin, 1998
- Sphinx chersis (Hubner, 1823)
- Sphinx chisoya (Schaus, 1932)
- Sphinx constricta Butler, 1885
- Sphinx crassistriga (Rothschild & Jordan, 1903)
- Sphinx dollii Neumoegen, 1881
- Sphinx drupiferarum JE Smith, 1797
- Sphinx formosana Riotte, 1970
- Sphinx franckii Neumoegen, 1893
- Sphinx gordius Cramer, 1779
- Sphinx kalmiae JE Smith, 1797
- Sphinx leucophaeata Clemens, 1859
- Sphinx libocedrus Edwards, 1881
- Sphinx ligustri Linnaeus, 1758
- Sphinx luscitiosa Clemens, 1859
- Sphinx maurorum (Jordan, 1931)
- Sphinx morio (Rothschild & Jordan, 1903)
- Sphinx nogueirai Haxaire, 2002
- Sphinx oberthueri (Rothschild & Jordan, 1903)
- Sphinx perelegans Edwards, 1874
- Sphinx pinastri Linnaeus, 1758
- Sphinx poecila Stephens, 1828
- Sphinx sequoiae Boisduval, 1868
- Sphinx vashti Strecker, 1878

== Gallery ==
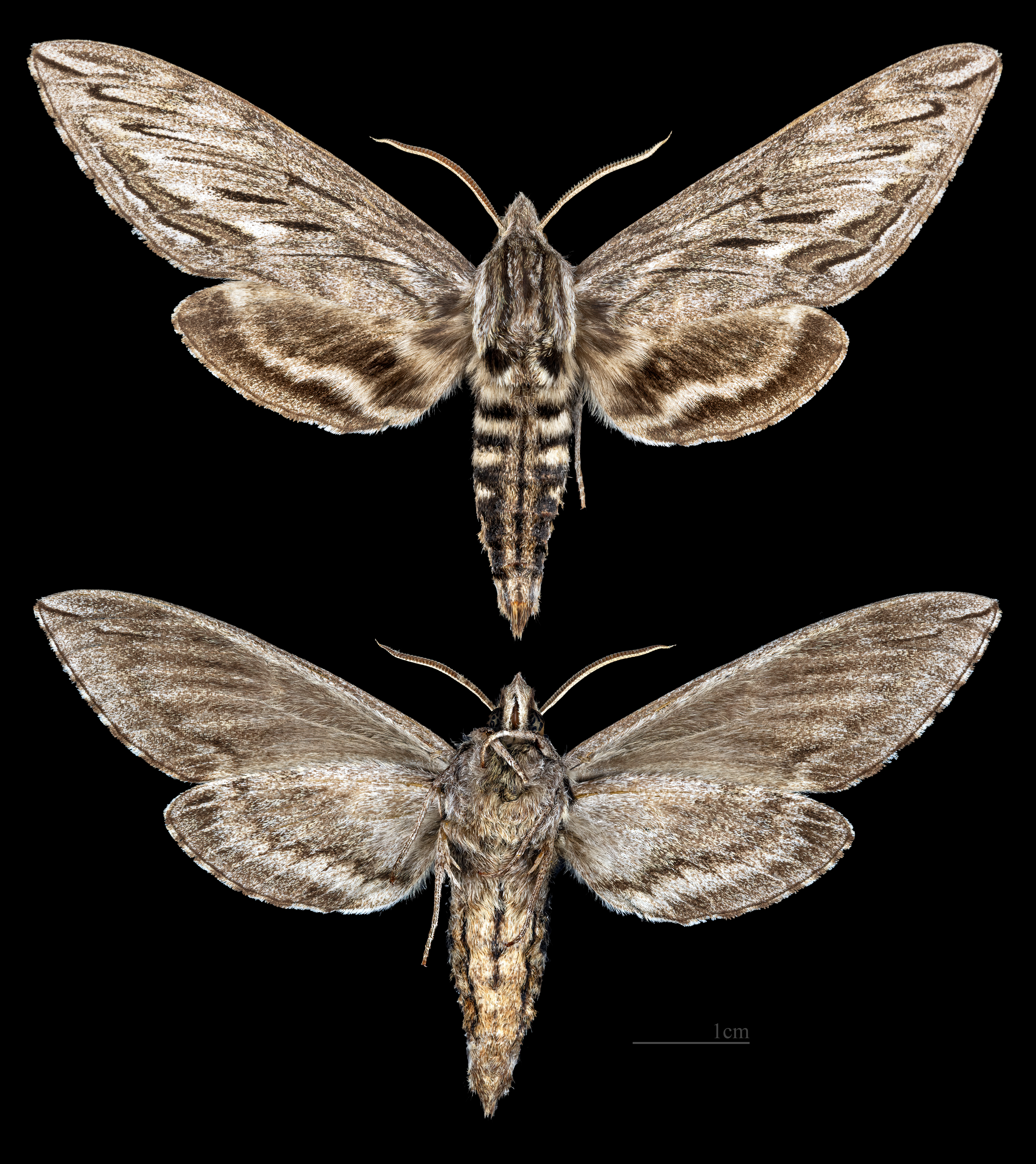
Sphinx canadensis

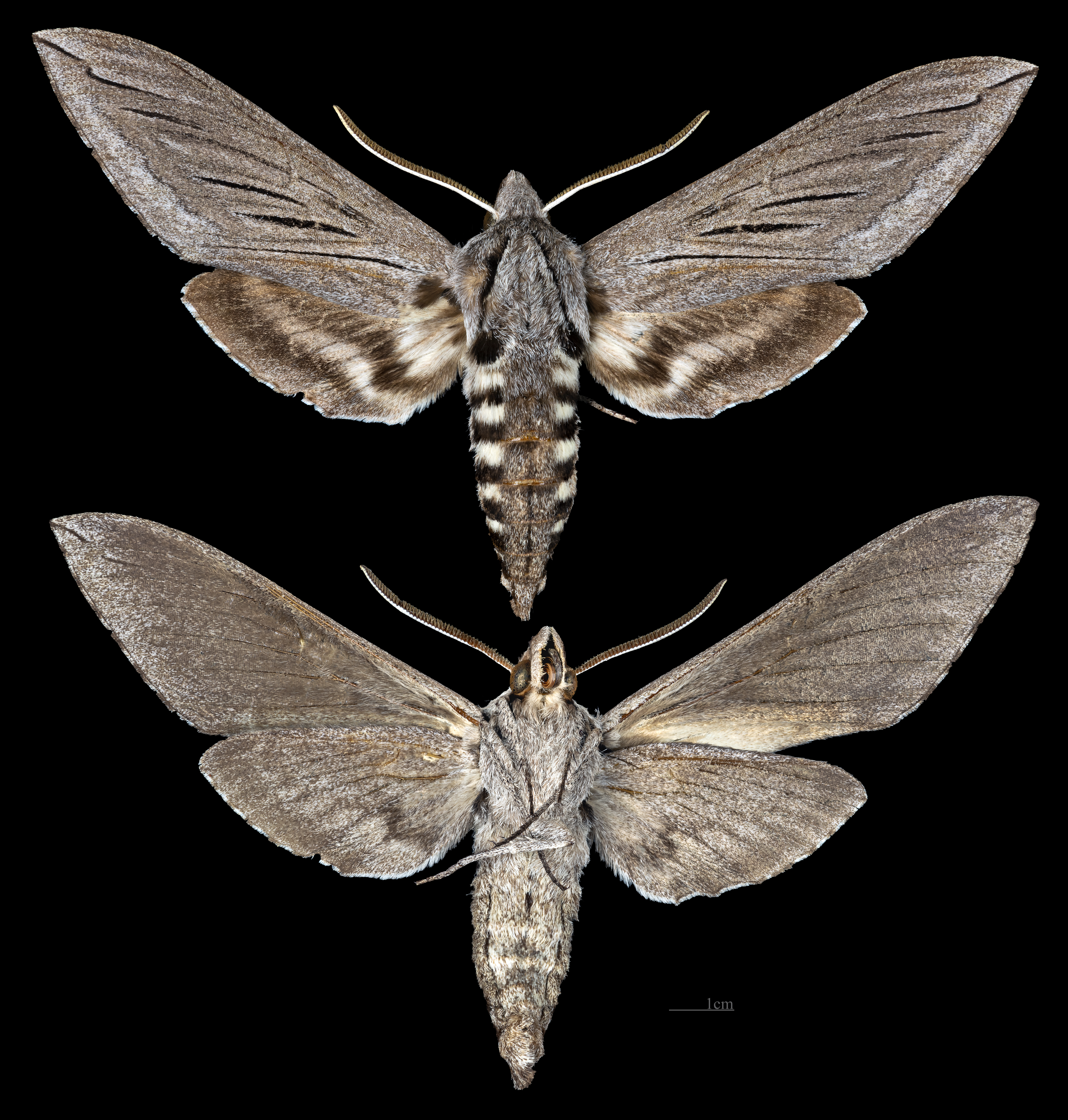
Sphinx chersis

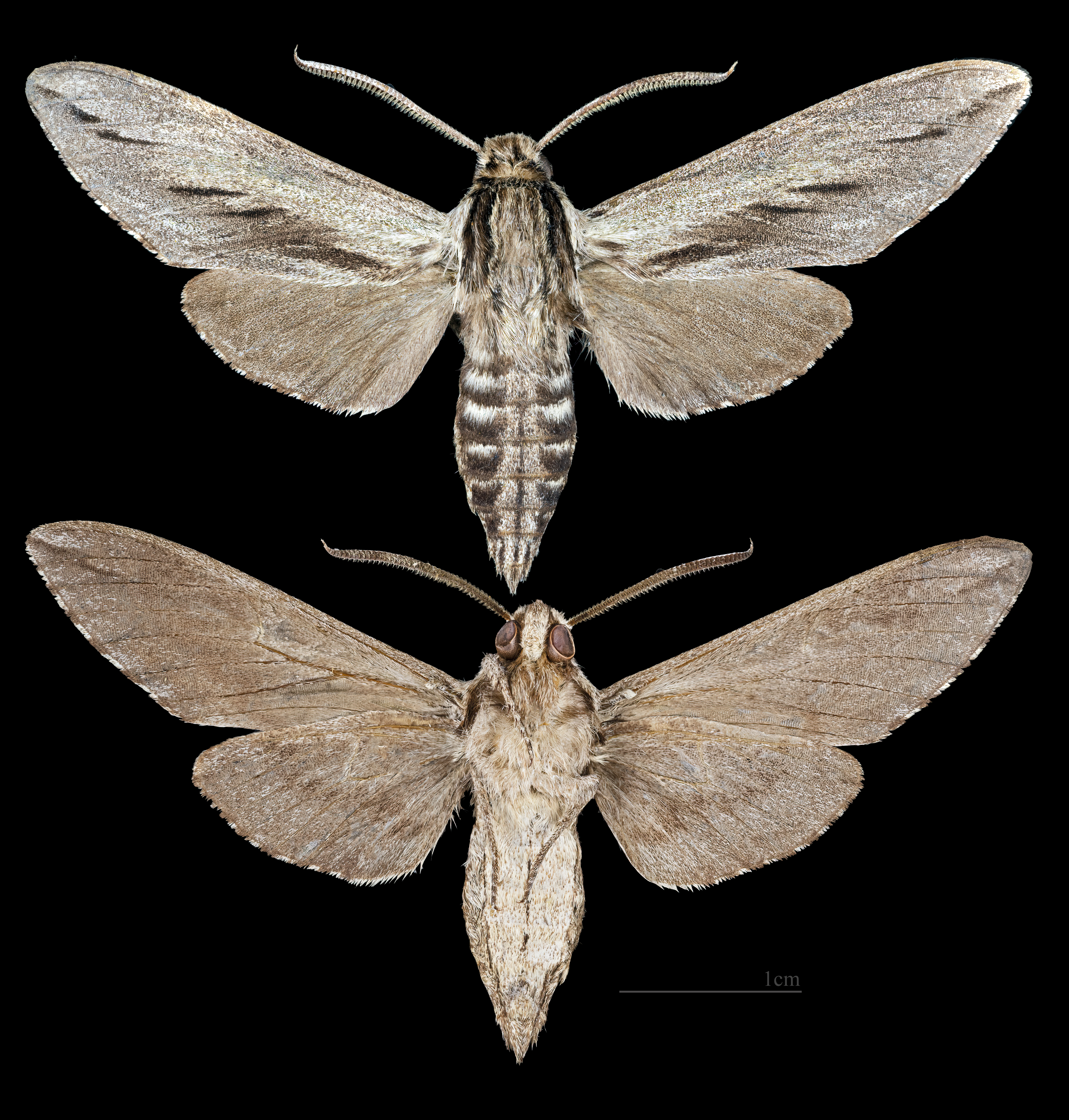
Sphinx dollii

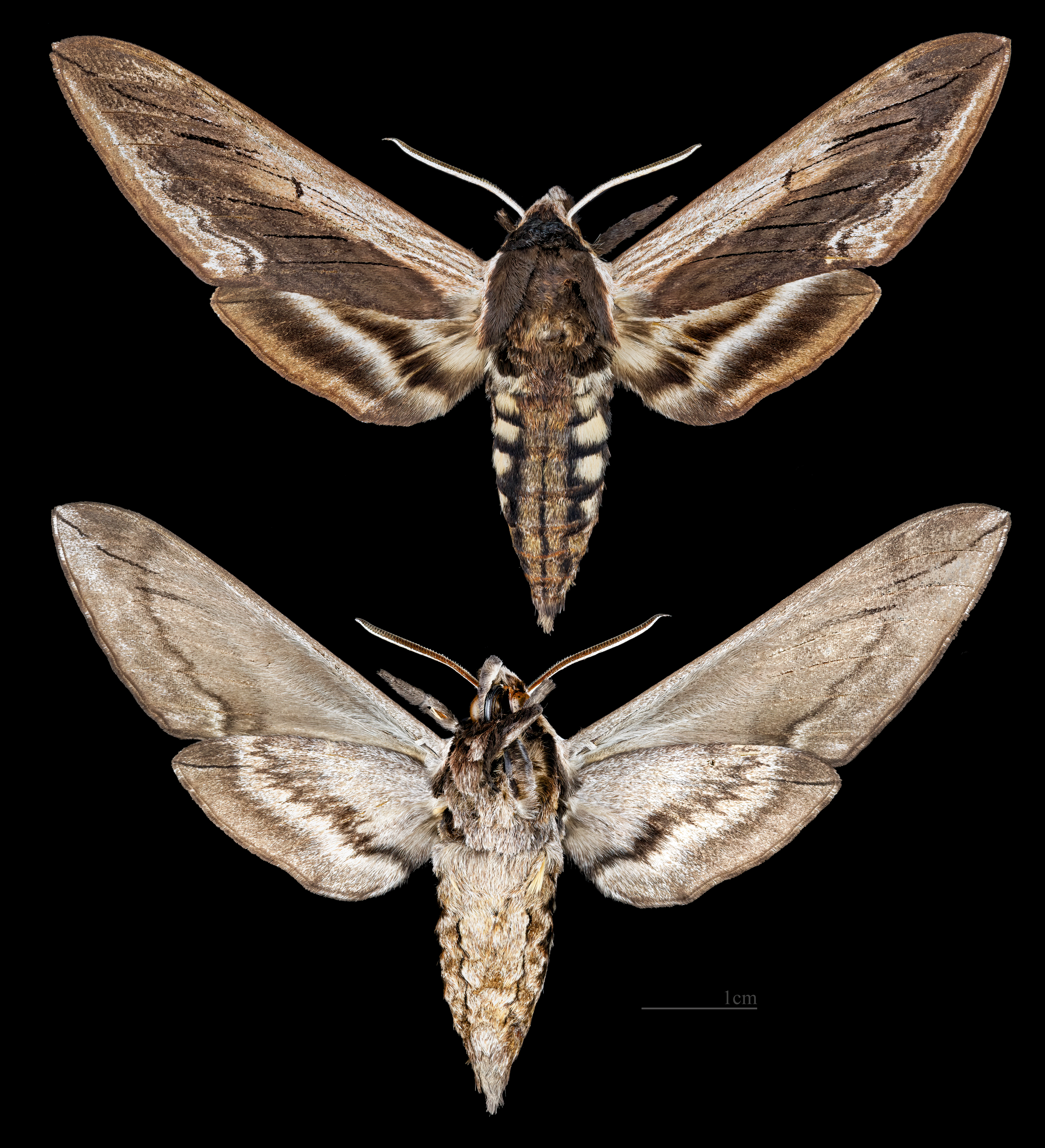
Sphinx drupiferarum

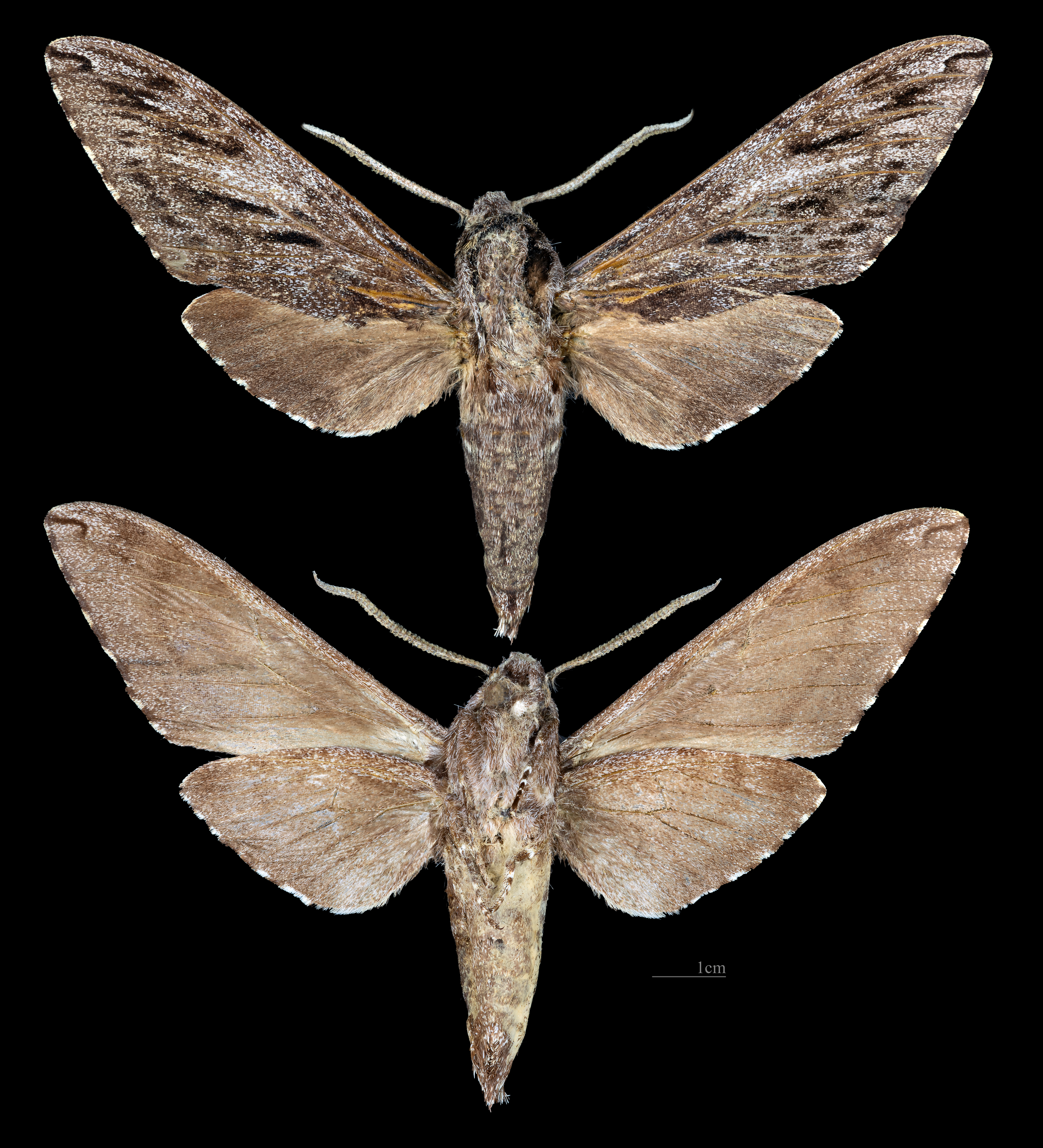
Sphinx formosana

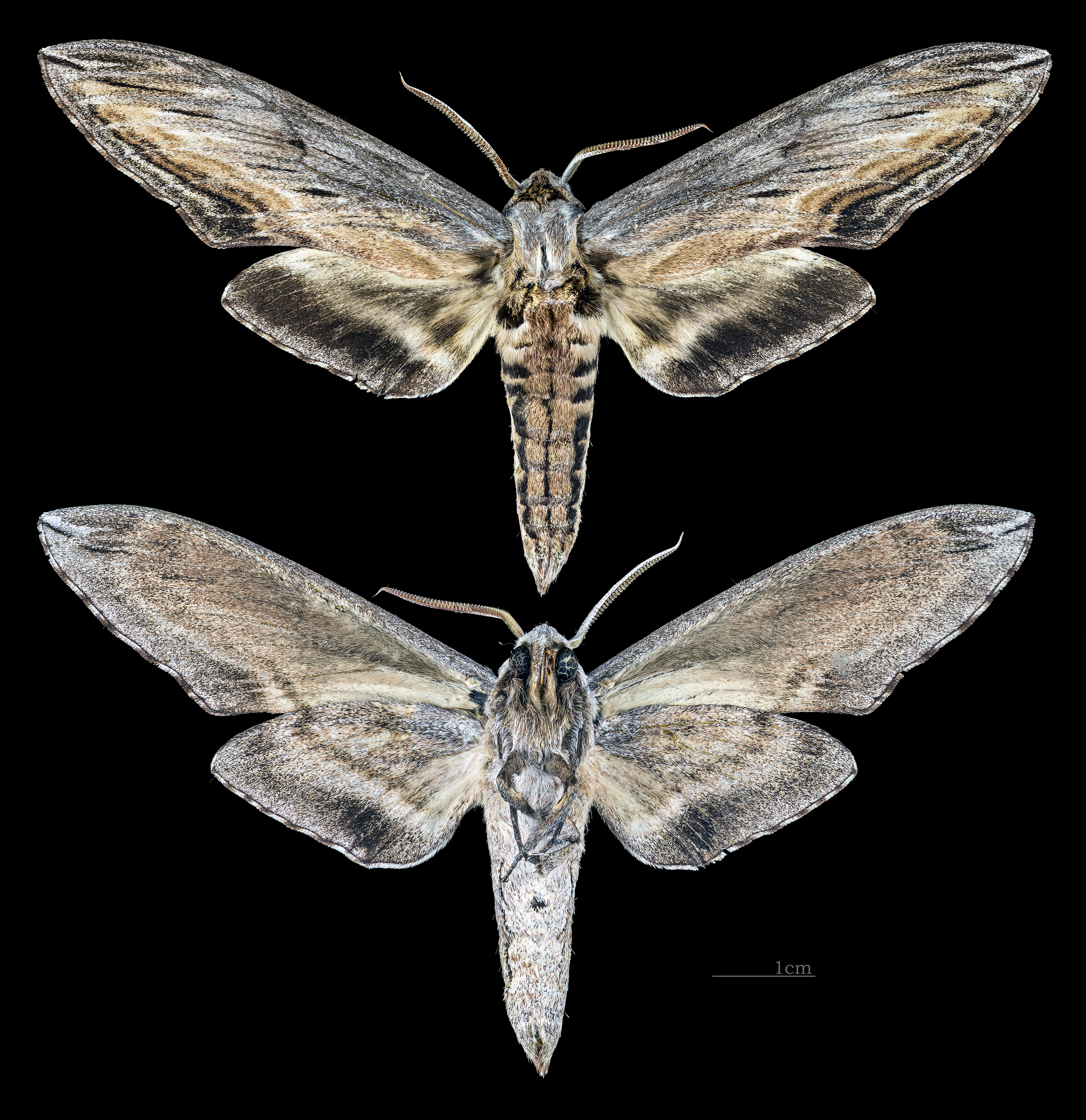
Sphinx franckii

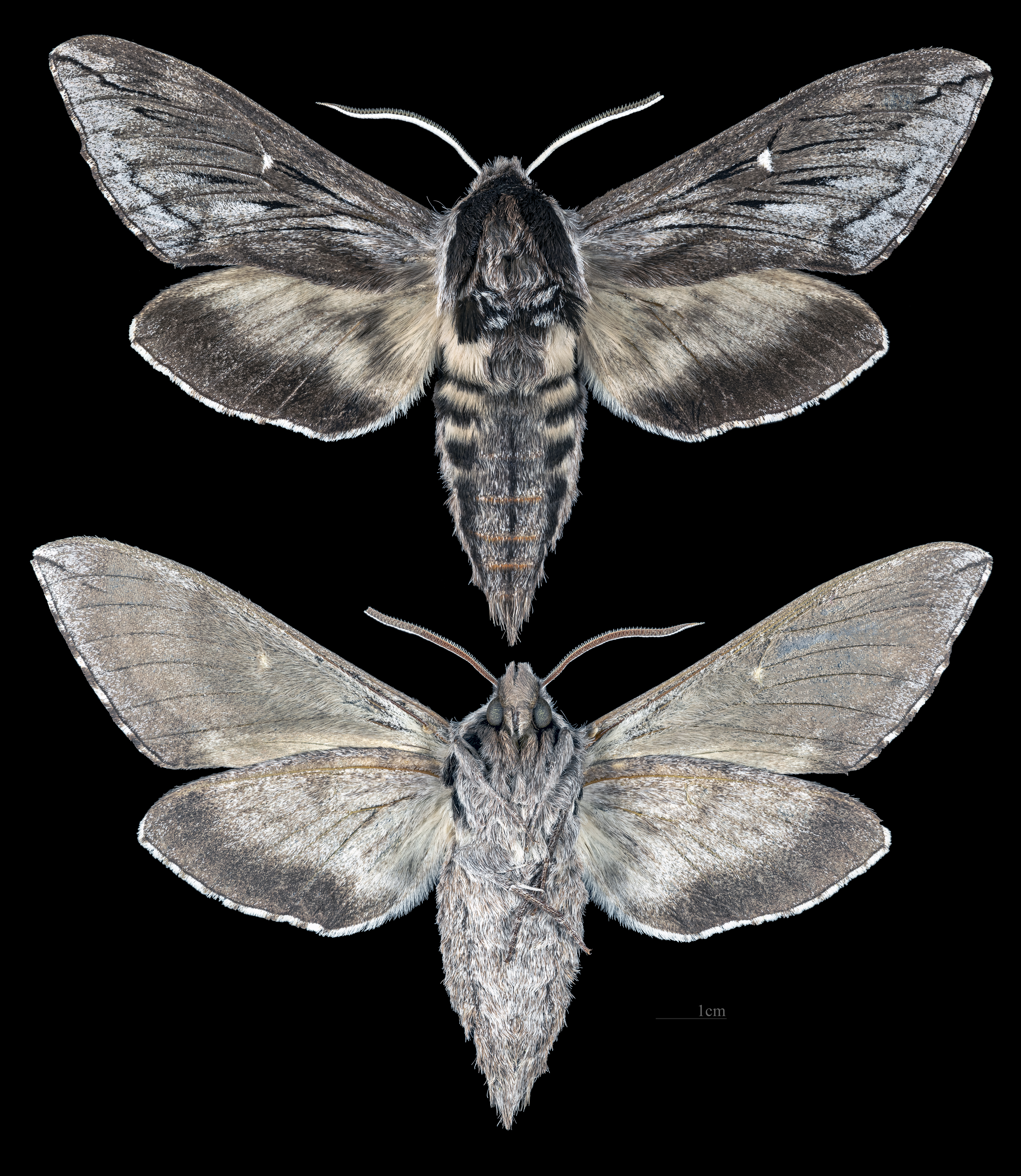
Sphinx gordius

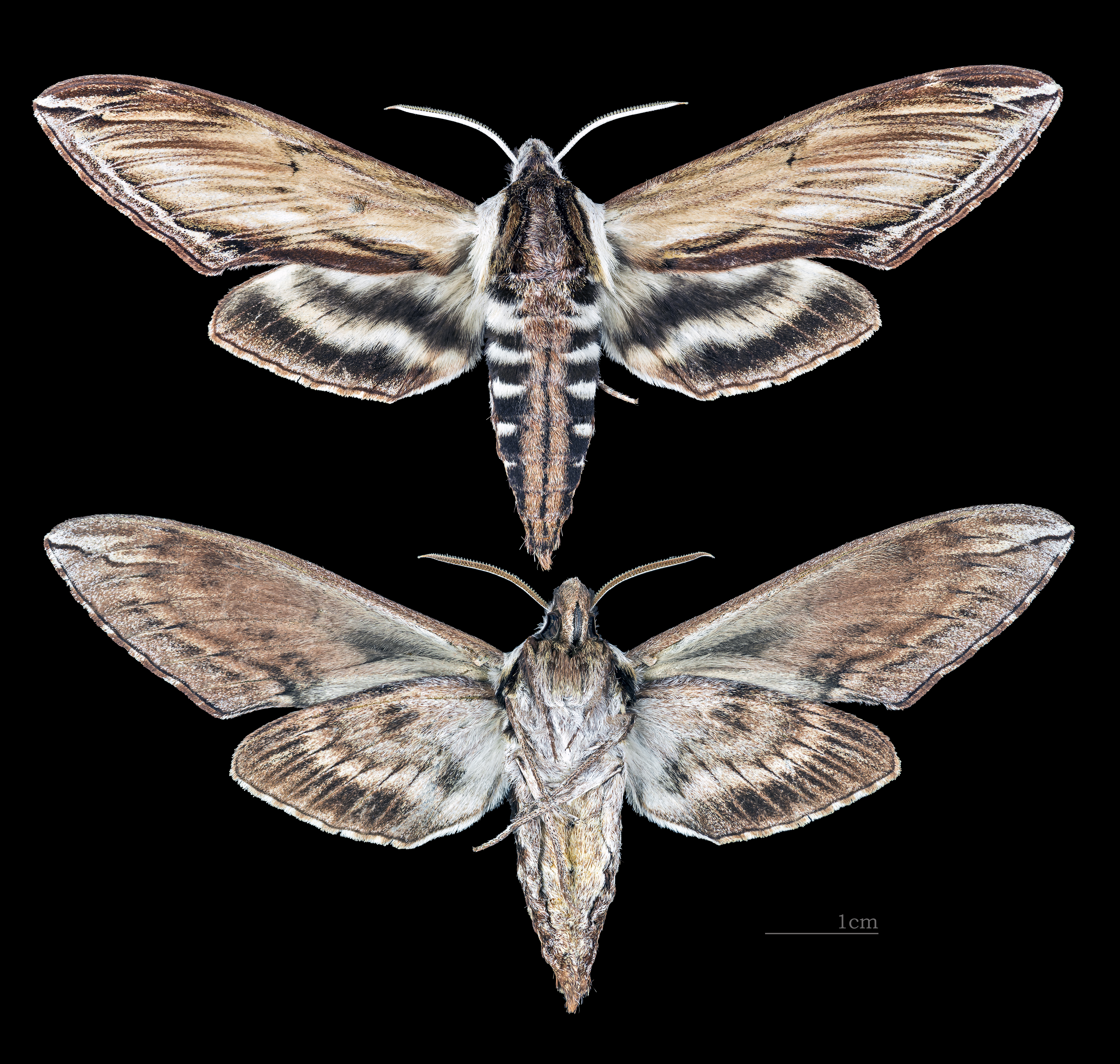
Sphinx kalmiae

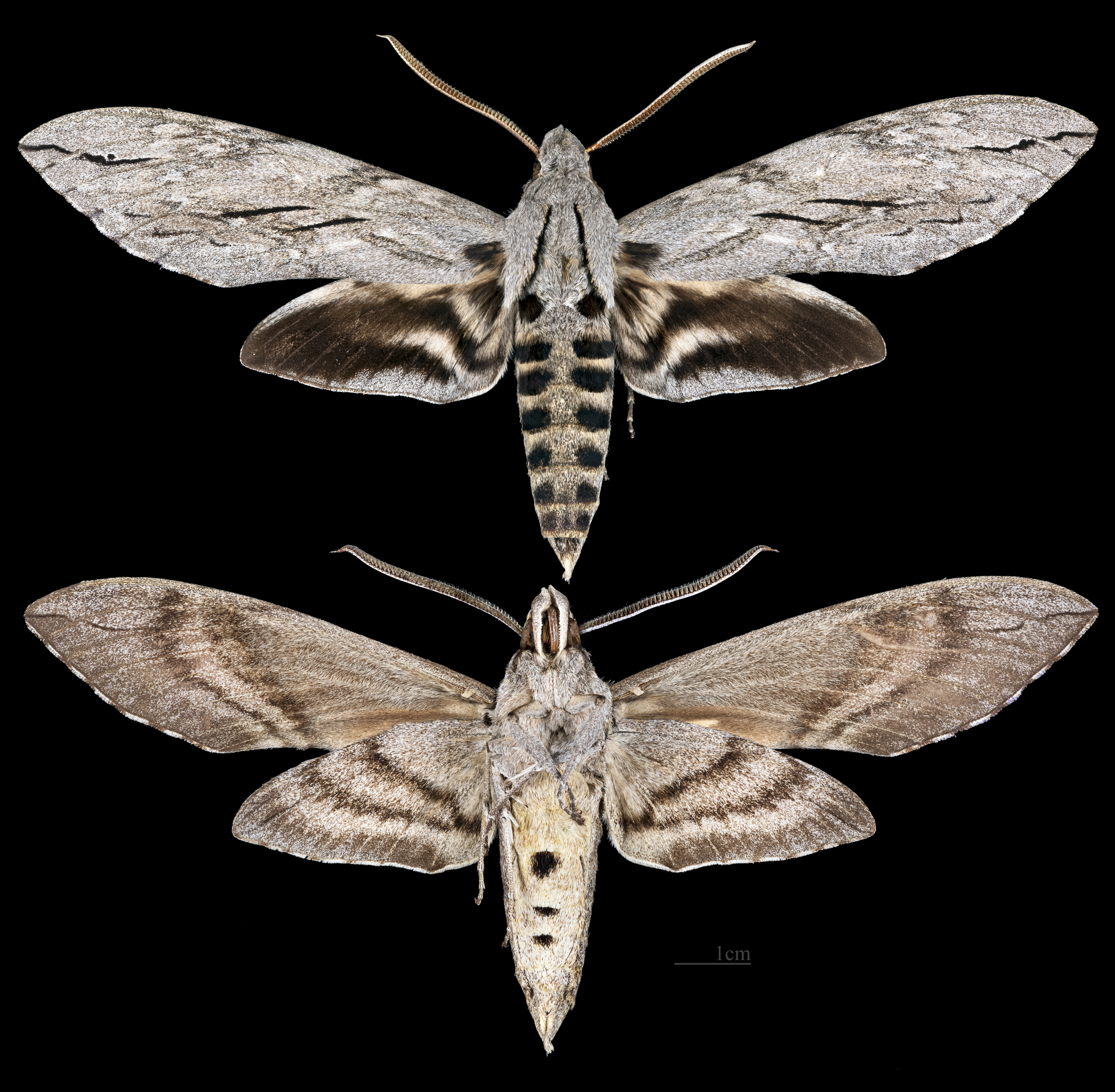
Sphinx kalmiae

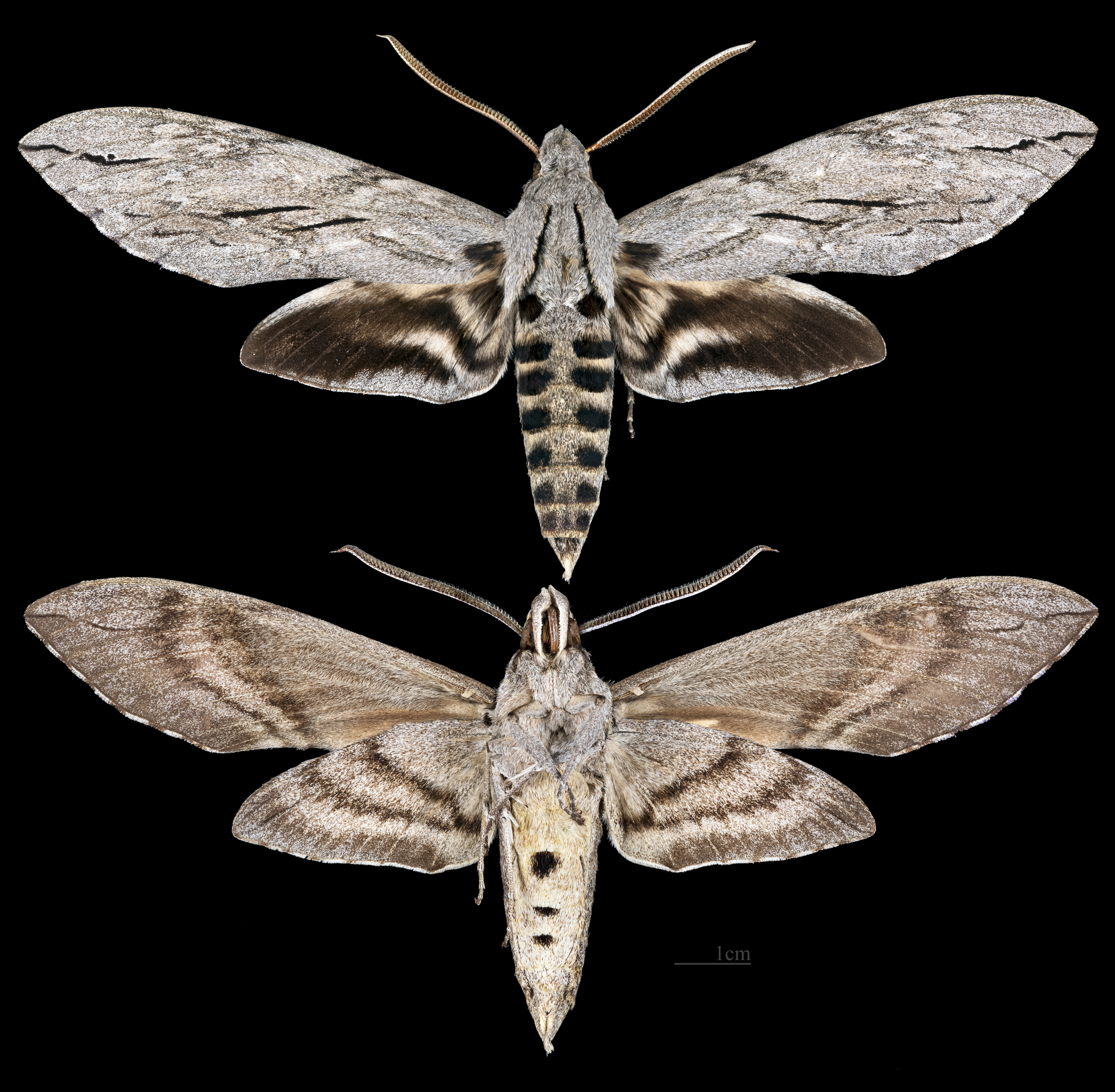
Sphinx leucophaeata

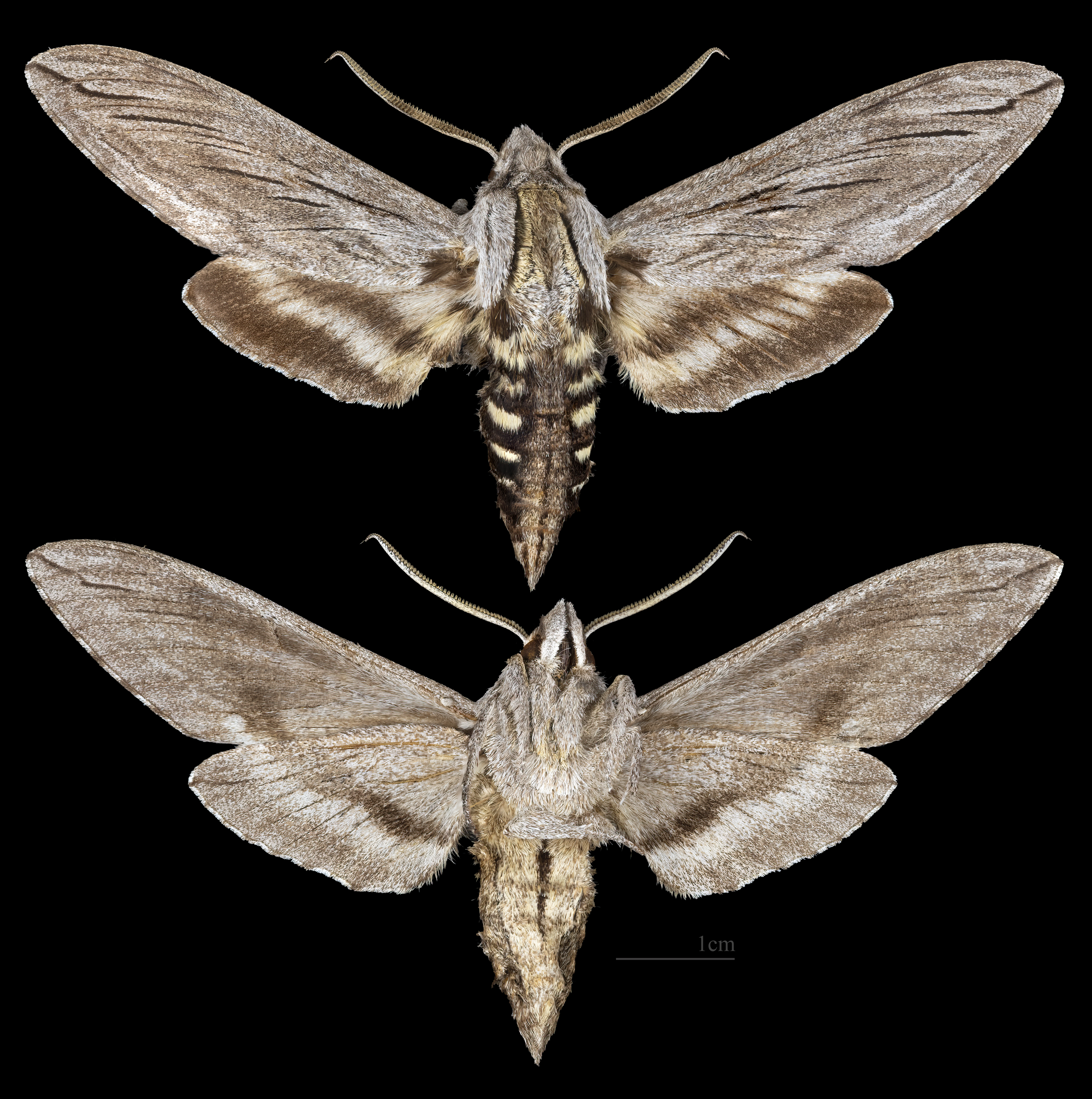
Sphinx libocedrus

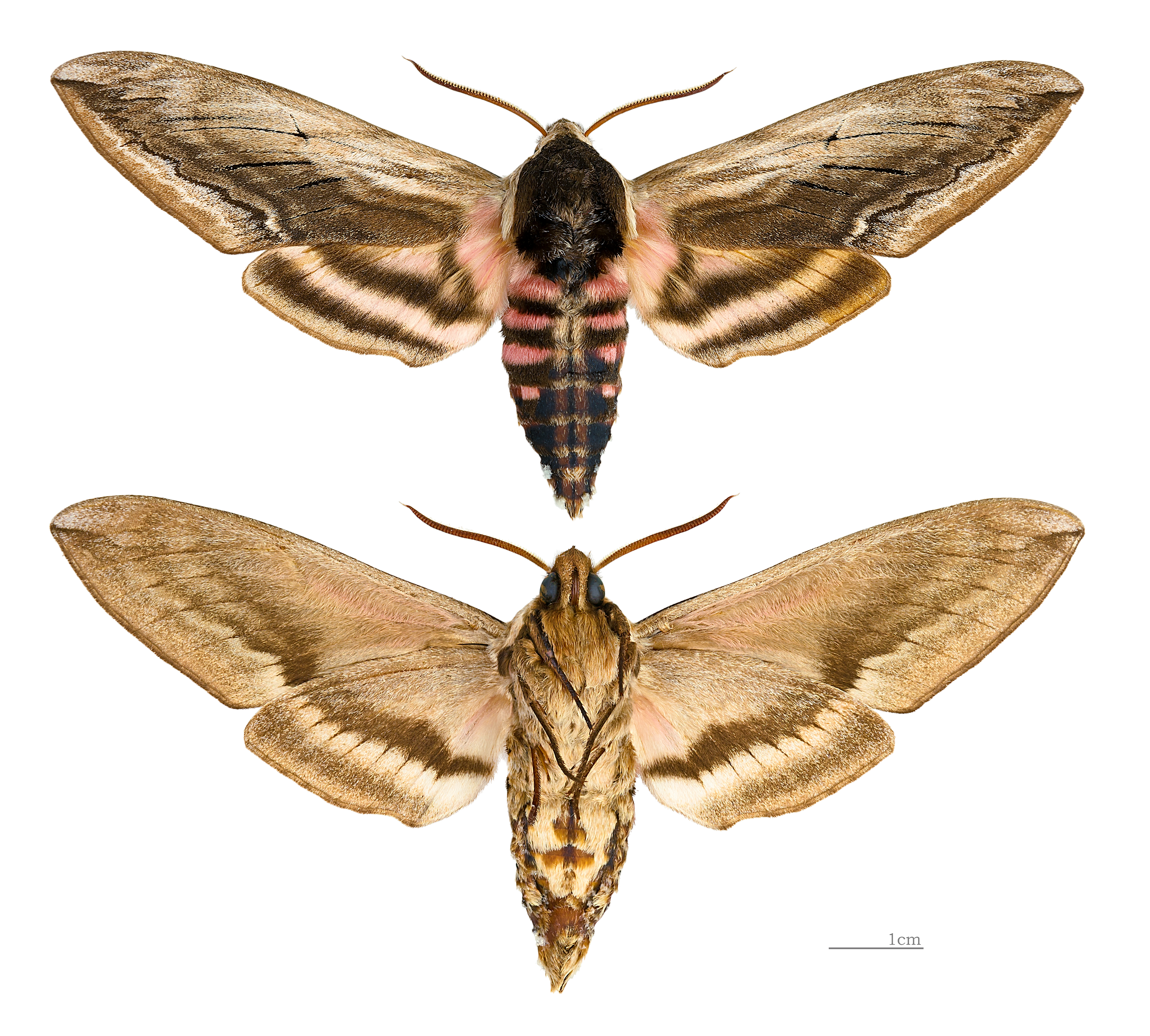
Sphinx ligustri

Sphinx luscitiosa

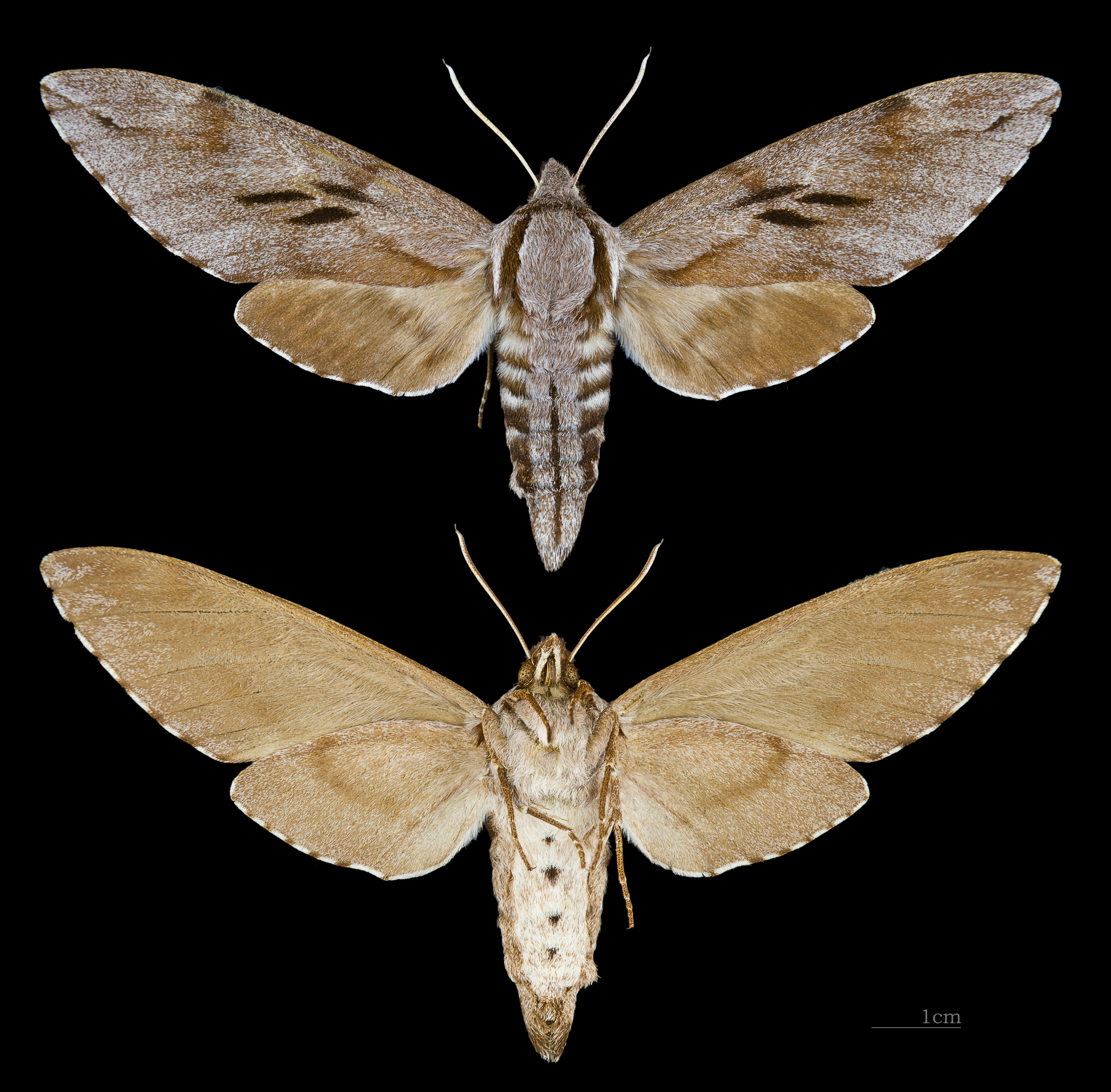
Sphinx pinastri

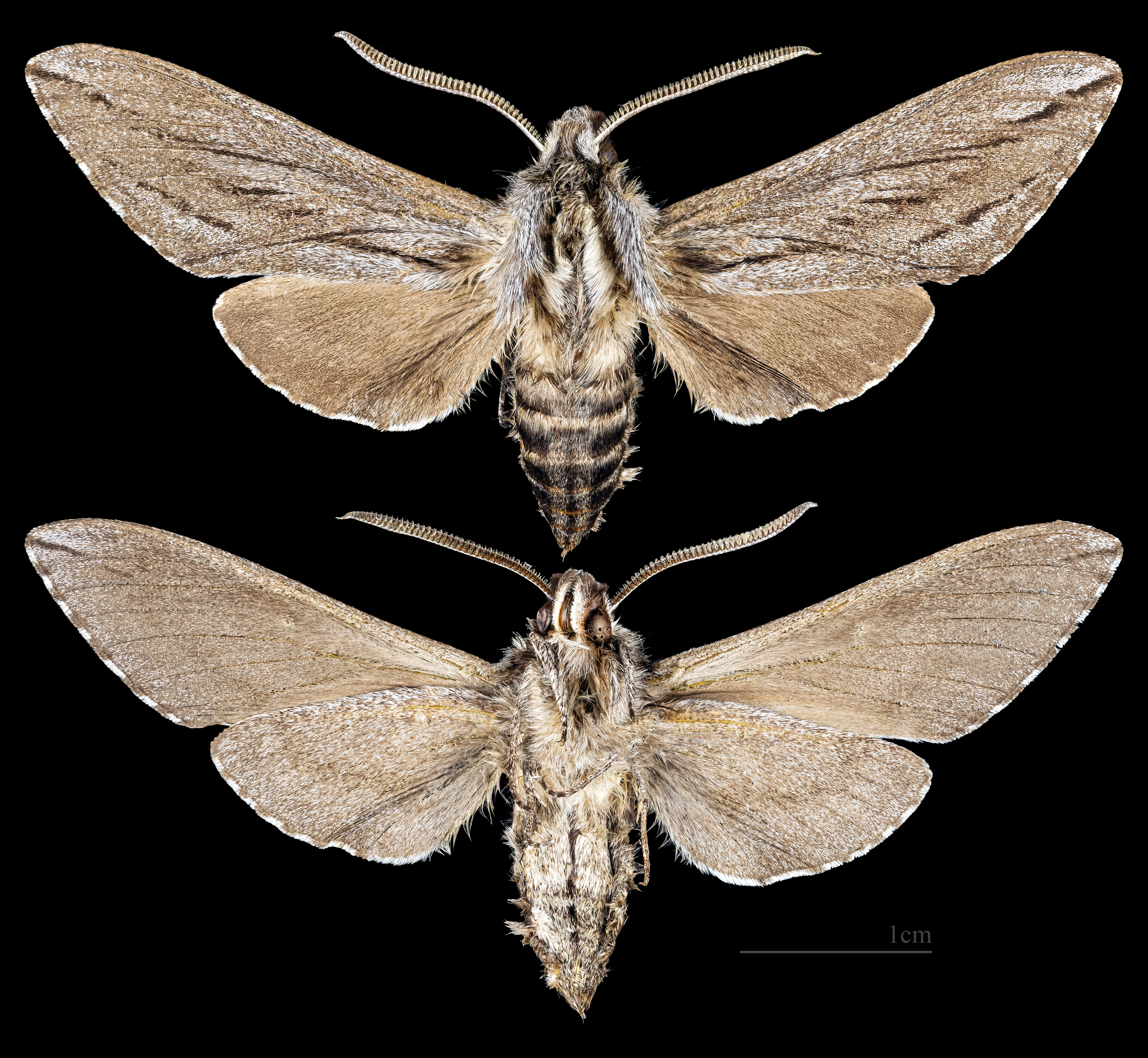
Sphinx sequoiae

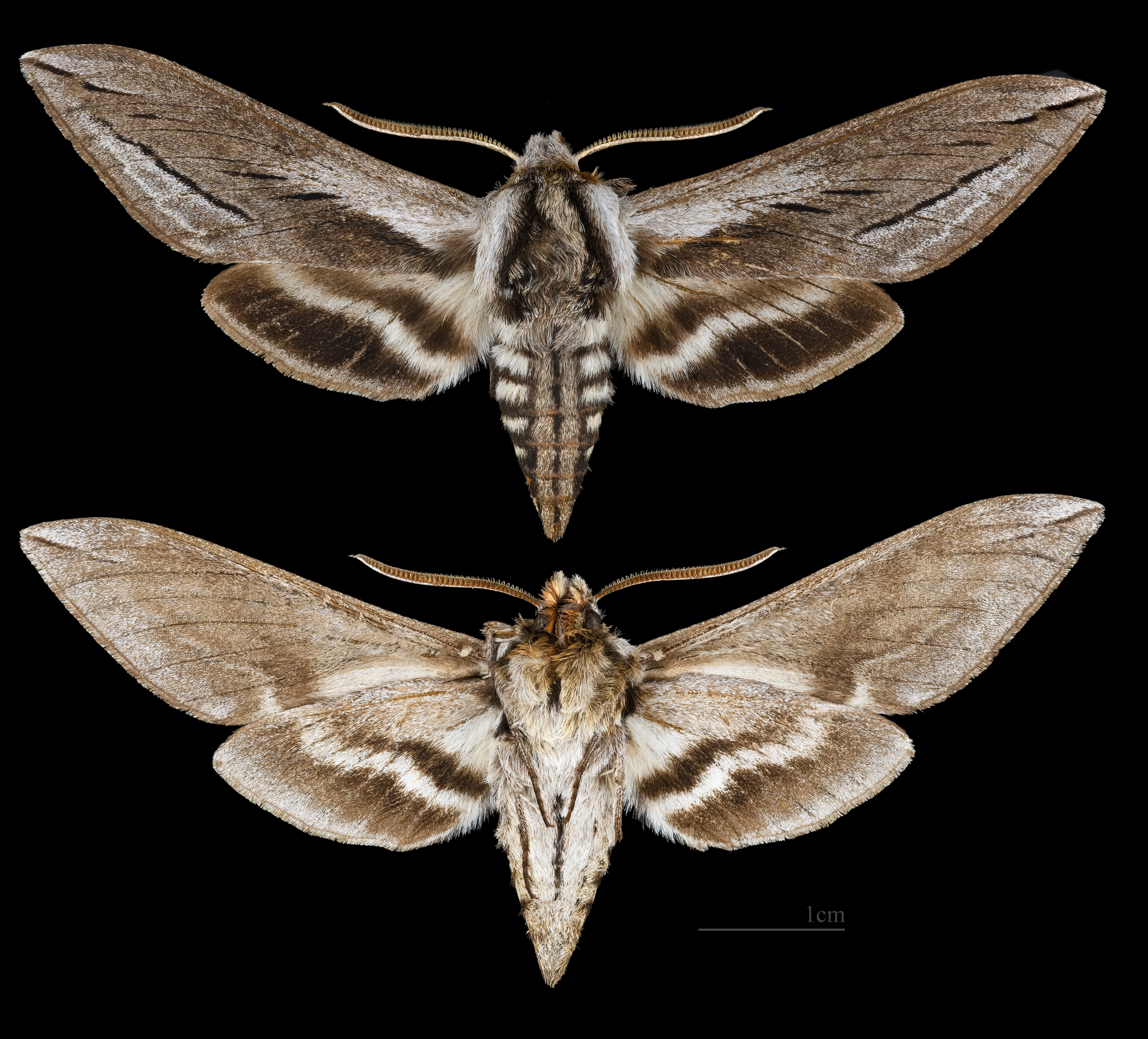
Sphinx vashti
