= Lethia umbellata =

Scientific classification
- Kingdom: Plantae
- Clade: Tracheophytes
- Clade: Angiosperms
- Clade: Monocots
- Order: Asparagales
- Family: Iridaceae
- Genus: Lethia
- Species: L. umbellata

Binomial name
- Lethia umbellata (Klatt) Ravenna

Synonyms
- Herbertia umbellata Klatt; Sphenostigma umbellatum (Klatt) Klatt

Species of flowering plant

Lethia umbellata is a species of flowering plants in the family Iridaceae first described in 1986. It is the only species in the monotypic genus of Lethia, and is native to Brazil and Bolivia.

The genus name of Lethia is named after the Greek mythology, Lethe; which is also referred to as Lemosyne and was one of the five rivers of the underworld of Hades. Which "alludes to the neglected species which, since the original collection by Sello (in 1818), was still waiting to be rediscovered".

The genus was circumscribed by Pierfelice Ravenna in Nordic J. Bot. vol.6 (Issue 5) on page 585 in 1986.
