= List of Lepidoptera of Michigan =

This is a list of butterflies and moths—species of the order Lepidoptera—that have been observed in the U.S. state of Michigan.

== Butterflies ==
=== Papilionidae ===
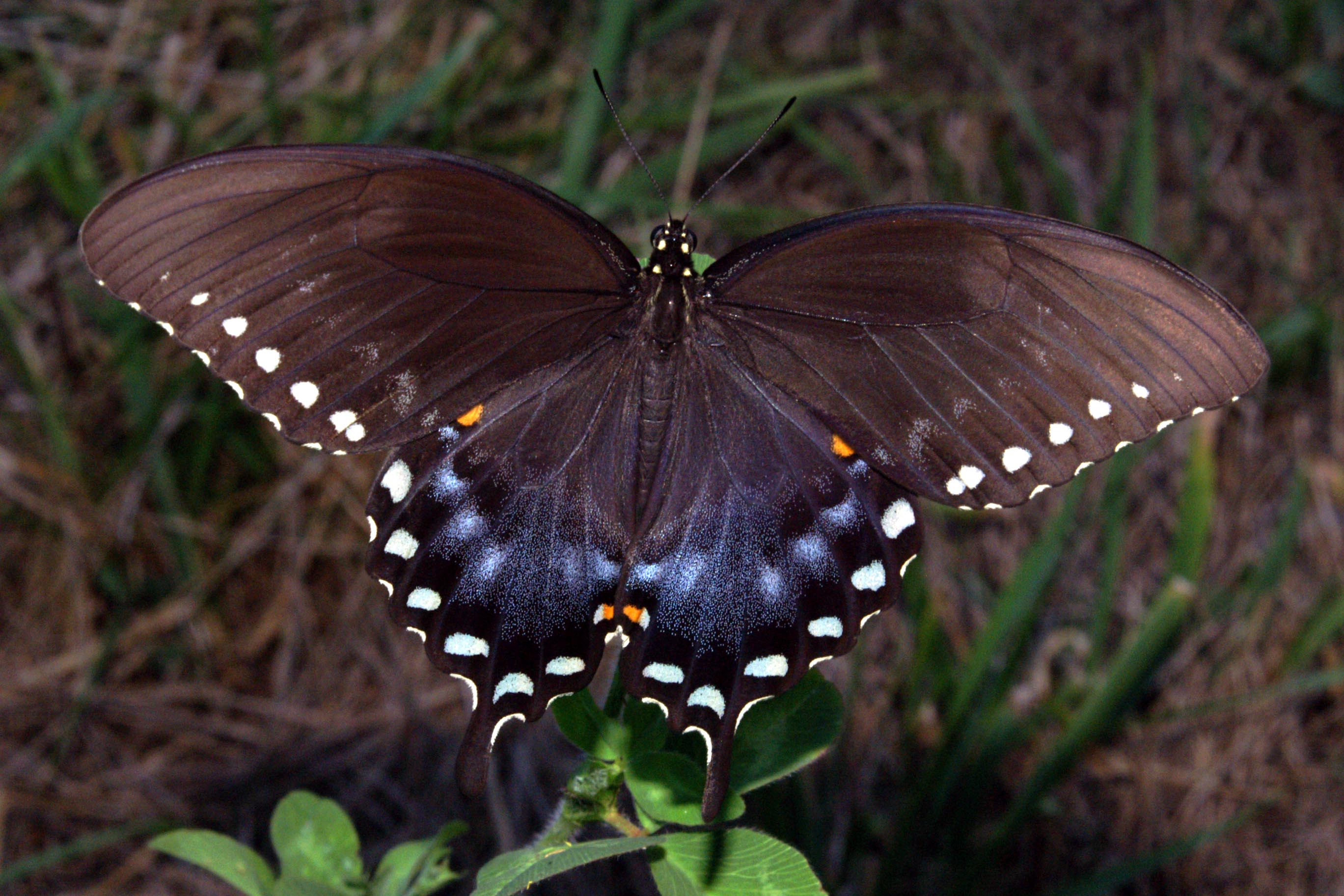
Spicebush swallowtail, Papilio troilus

- Eastern tiger swallowtail, Papilio glaucus
- Canadian tiger swallowtail, Papilio canadensis
- Spicebush swallowtail, Papilio troilus
- Black swallowtail, Papilio polyxenes
- Giant swallowtail, Papilio cresphontes
- Zebra swallowtail, Eurytides marcellus
- Pipevine swallowtail, Battus philenor

=== Pieridae ===
- Cabbage white, Pieris rapae
- Mustard white, Pieris oleracea
- West Virginia white, Pieris virginiensis
- Checkered white, Pontia protodice
- Olympia marble, Euchloe olympia
- Clouded sulphur, Colias philodice
- Orange sulphur, Colias eurytheme
- Pink-edged sulphur, Colias interior
- Little yellow, Eurema lisa

=== Lycaenidae ===
==== Lycaenini ====
- American copper, Lycaena phlaeas
- Dorcas copper, Lycaena dorcas
- Purplish copper, Lycaena helloides
- Bog copper, Lycaena epixanthe
- Bronze copper, Lycaena hyllus
- Harvester, Feniseca tarquinius

==== Theclini & Eumaeini ====
- Gray hairstreak, Strymon melinus
- White M hairstreak, Parrhasius m-album
- Banded hairstreak, Satyrium calanus
- Hickory hairstreak, Satyrium caryaevorus
- Edward's hairstreak, Satyrium edwardsii
- Striped hairstreak, Satyrium liparops
- Northern oak hairstreak, Satyrium favonius ontario
- Acadian hairstreak, Satyrium acadica
- Coral hairstreak, Satyrium titus
- Brown elfin, Callophrys augustinus
- Henry's elfin, Callophrys henrici
- Frosted elfin, Callophrys irus
- Hoary elfin, Callophrys polios
- Eastern pine elfin, Callophrys niphon
- Western pine elfin, Callophrys eryphon
- Early hairstreak, Erora laeta

==== Polyommatini ====
- Eastern tailed-blue, Cupido comyntas
- Silvery blue, Glaucopsyche lygdamus
- Spring azure, Celastrina ladon
- Summer azure, Celastrina neglecta
- Greenish blue, Icaricia saepiolus
- Melissa blue, Plebejus melissa
- Karner blue, Plebejus melissa samuelis
- Anna's blue, Plebejus anna

=== Riodinidae ===
- Swamp metalmark, Calephelis muticum

=== Nymphalidae ===
==== Heliconiinae ====
- Variegated fritillary, Euptoieta claudia
- Great spangled fritillary, Speyeria cybele
- Atlantis fritillary, Speyeria atlantis
- Aphrodite fritillary, Speyeria aphrodite
- Meadow fritillary, Boloria bellona
- Frigga fritillary, Boloria frigga
- Silver-bordered fritillary, Boloria selene
- Bog fritillary, Boloria eunomia
- Freija fritillary, Boloria freija

==== Nymphalinae ====
- Pearl crescent, Phyciodes tharos
- Northern crescent, Phyciodes cocyta
- Tawny crescent, Phyciodes batesii
- Gorgone checkerspot, Chlosyne gorgone
- Silvery checkerspot, Chlosyne nycteis
- Harris's checkerspot, Chlosyne harrisii
- Baltimore checkerspot, Euphydryas phaeton
- Question mark, Polygonia interrogationis
- Eastern comma, Polygonia comma
- Satyr comma, Polygonia satyrus
- Green comma, Polygonia faunus
- Hoary comma, Polygonia gracilis
- Gray comma, Polygonia progne
- Compton tortoiseshell, Nymphalis vaualbum
- Mourning cloak, Nymphalis antiopa
- Milbert's tortoiseshell, Aglais milberti
- Red admiral, Vanessa atalanta
- American lady, Vanessa virginiensis
- Painted lady, Vanessa cardui
- Common buckeye, Junonia coenia
- White admiral, Limenitis arthemis
- Red-spotted purple, Limenitis arthemis
- Viceroy, Limenitis archippus
- Hackberry emperor, asterocampa celtis
- Tawny emperor, asterocampa clyton
- American snout, Libytheana carinenta
- Monarch, Danaus plexippus

==== Satyrinae ====
- Little wood satyr, Megisto cymela
- Mitchell's satyr, Neonympha mitchellii
- Common wood nymph, Cercyonis pegala
- Eyed brown, Satyrodes eurydice
- Appalachian brown, Satyrodes appalachia
- Northern pearly-eye, Enodia anthedon
- Common ringlet, Coenonympha tullia
- Red-disked alpine, Erebia discoidalis
- Chryxus Arctic, Oeneis chryxus
- Jutta Arctic, Oeneis jutta

=== Hesperiidae ===
==== Pyrginae & Pyrrhopyginae ====
- Silver-spotted skipper, Epargyreus clarus
- Hoary Edge, Achalarus lyciades
- Southern cloudywing, Thorybes bathyllus
- Northern cloudywing, Thorybes pylades
- Juvenal's duskywing, Erynnis juvenalis
- Horace's duskywing, Erynnis horatius
- Dreamy duskywing, Erynnis icelus
- Sleepy duskywing, Erynnis brizo
- Persius duskywing, Erynnis persius
- Wild indigo duskywing, Erynnis baptisiae
- Columbine duskywing, Erynnis lucilius
- Mottled duskywing, Erynnis martialis
- Common checkered-skipper, Pyrgus communis
- Grizzled skipper, Pyrgus centaureae
- Common sootywing, Pholisora catullus

==== Heteropterinae & Hesperiinae ====
- Arctic skipper, Carterocephalus palaemon
- European skipper, Thymelicus lineola
- Least skipper, Ancyloxypha numitor
- Poweshiek skipperling, Oarisma poweshiek
- Common branded skipper, Hesperia comma
- Cobweb skipper, Hesperia metea
- Leonard's skipper, Hesperia leonardus
- Indian skipper, Hesperia sassacus
- Ottoe skipper, Hesperia ottoe
- Long dash, Polites mystic
- Peck's skipper, Polites peckius
- Tawny-edged skipper, Polites themistocles
- Crossline skipper, Polites origenes
- Black dash, Euphyes conspicua
- Northern broken-dash, Wallengrenia egeremet
- Little glassywing, Pompeius verna
- Dun skipper, Euphyes vestris
- Hobomok skipper, Poanes hobomok
- Zabulon skipper, Poanes zabulon
- Mulberry wing, Poanes massasoit
- Broad-winged skipper, Poanes viator
- Two-spotted skipper, Euphyes bimacula
- Dion skipper, Euphyes dion
- Duke's skipper, Euphyes dukesi
- Delaware skipper, Anatrytone logan
- Dusted skipper, Atrytonopsis hianna
- Common roadside skipper, Amblyscirtes vialis
- Pepper-and-salt skipper, Amblyscirtes hegon

== Moths ==
=== Arctiidae ===
==== Arctiinae ====
- Carlotta's tiger moth, Apantesis carlotta
- Nais tiger moth, Apantesis nais
- Harnessed moth, Apantesis phalerata
- Garden tiger moth, Arctia caja
- Yellow-colored scape moth, Cisseps fulvicollis
- Salt marsh moth, Estigmene acrea
- Celia's tiger moth, Grammia celia
- Figured tiger moth, Grammia figurata
- Oithana tiger moth, Grammia oithona
- Phyllira tiger moth, Grammia phyllira
- Little virgin tiger moth, Grammia virguncula
- Banded tussock moth, Halysidota tessellaris
- Confused haploa moth, Haploa confusa
- Orange holomelina moth, Holomelina aurantiaca
- Buchholz's holomelina moth, Holomelina buchholzi
- Immaculate holomelina moth, Holomelina immaculata
- Bog holomelina moth, Holomelina lamae
- Giant leopard moth, Hypercompe scribonia
- Ruby tiger moth, Phragmatobia fuliginosa
- Large ruby tiger moth, Phragmatobia assimilans
- Lined ruby tiger moth, Phragmatobia lineata
- Isabella tiger moth, Pyrrharctia isabella
- Agreeable tiger moth, Spilosoma congrua
- Dubious tiger moth, Spilosoma dubia
- Pink-legged tiger moth, Spilosoma latipennis
- Virginia tiger moth, Spilosoma virginica

==== Ctenuchinae ====
- Yellow-colored scape moth, Cisseps fulvicollis
- Virginia ctenucha moth, Ctenucha virginica

==== Lithosiinae ====
- Pale lichen moth, Crambidia pallida
- Painted lichen moth, Hypoprepia fucosa
- Scarlet lichen moth, Hypoprepia miniata

=== Crambidae ===
- Celery leaftier moth, Udea rubigalis

=== Elachistidae ===
- Hemlock moth, Agonopterix alstroemeriana

=== Erebidae ===
==== Catocalinae ====
- Three-staff underwing moth, Catocala amestris
- Yellow-banded underwing moth, Catocala cerogama

=== Geometridae ===
==== Ennominae ====
- Peppered moth, Biston betularia
- Pale beauty moth, Campaea perlata
- Spiny looper moth, Phigalia titea

==== Larentiinae ====
- White-striped black moth, Trichodezia albovittata

=== Lasiocampidae ===
==== Lasiocampinae ====
- Eastern tent caterpillar moth, Malacosoma americanum
- Forest tent caterpillar moth, Malacosoma disstria

=== Limacodidae ===
- Saddleback caterpillar moth, Acharia stimulea

=== Lymantriidae ===
- Gypsy moth, Lymantria dispar
- White-marked tussock moth, Orgyia leucostigma

=== Noctuidae ===
==== Amphipyrinae ====
- Copper underwing moth, Amphipyra pyramidea

==== Hadeninae ====
- White-speck moth, Mythimna unipuncta

==== Herminiinae ====
- Grayish zanclognatha moth, Zanclognatha pedipilalis

==== Noctuinae ====
- Large yellow underwing, Noctua pronuba

=== Notodontidae ===
- Sigmoid prominent moth, Clostera albosigma
- Apical prominent moth, Clostera apicalis
- Linden prominent moth, Ellida caniplaga
- White furcula moth, Furcula borealis
- Modest furcula moth, Furcula modesta
- Western furcula moth, Furcula occidentalis
- Lintner's pebble moth, Gluphisia lintneri
- Small pebble moth, Gluphisia septentrionis
- Saddle prominent moth, Heterocampa guttivitta
- Oblique heterocampa moth, Heterocampa obliqua
- White-blotched heterocampa moth, Heterocampa umbrata
- Zaya heterocampa moth, Heterocampa zayasi
- Pink prominent moth, Hyparpax aurora
- Georgian prominent moth, Hyperaeschra georgica
- Double-lined prominent moth, Lochmaeus bilineata
- Variable oakleaf moth, Lochmaeus manteo
- Mottled prominent moth, Macrurocampa marthesia
- Drab prominent moth, Misogada unicolor
- Rough prominent moth, Nadata gibbosa
- Double-toothed prominent moth, Nerice bidentata
- Base-streaked prominent moth, Notodonta scitipennis
- Elegant prominent moth, Odontosia elegans
- Chocolate prominent moth, Peridea ferruginea
- Angulose prominent moth, Peridea angulosa
- Black-rimmed prominent moth, Pheosia rimosa
- Chestnut schizura, Schizura badia
- Red-humped caterpillar moth, Schizura concinna
- Morning-glory prominent moth, Schizura ipomoeae
- Black-blotched schizura moth, Schizura leptinoides
- Unicorn caterpillar moth, Schizura unicornis

=== Saturniidae ===
==== Citheroniinae ====
- Orangestriped oakworm moth, Anisota senatoria
- Spiny oakworm moth, Anisota stigma
- Pink-striped oakworm moth, Anisota virginiensis
- Regal moth, Citheronia regalis
- Rosy maple moth, Dryocampa rubicunda
- Imperial moth, Eacles imperialis
- Honey locust moth, Sphingicampa bicolor
- Bisected honey locust moth, Sphingicampa bisecta

==== Hemileucinae ====
- Io moth, Automeris io
- Buck moth, Hemileuca maia
- Nevada buck moth, Hemileuca nevadensis

==== Saturniinae ====
- Luna moth, Actias luna
- Polyphemus moth, Antheraea polyphemus
- Giant silkmoth, Callosamia angulifera
- Promethea silkmoth, Callosamia promethea
- Columbia silkmoth, Hyalophora columbia
- Cecropia moth, Hyalophora cecropia

=== Sphingidae ===
==== Macroglossinae ====
- Tantalus sphinx, Aellopos tantalus
- Nessus sphinx, Amphion floridensis
- Azalea sphinx, Darapsa choerilus
- Virginia creeper sphinx, Darapsa myron
- Hydrangea sphinx, Darapsa versicolor
- Lettered sphinx, Deidamia inscriptum
- Mournful sphinx, Enyo lugubris
- Ello sphinx, Erinnyis ello
- Achemon sphinx, Eumorpha achemon
- Pandora sphinx moth, Eumorpha pandorus
- Snowberry clearwing, Hemaris diffinis
- Slender clearwing, Hemaris gracilis
- Hummingbird clearwing, Hemaris thysbe
- Bedstraw hawkmoth, Hyles gallii
- White-lined sphinx, Hyles lineata
- Abbott's sphinx, Sphecodina abbottii
- Tersa sphinx, Xylophanes tersa

==== Sphinginae ====
- Pink-spotted hawkmoth, Agrius cingulata
- Five-spotted hawkmoth, Manduca quinquemaculata
- Clemens' hawkmoth, Sphinx luscitiosa
- Tobacco hornworm, Manduca sexta
- Walnut sphinx, Amorpha juglandis
- Elm sphinx, Ceratomia amyntor
- Catalpa sphinx, Ceratomia catalpae
- Waved sphinx, Ceratomia undulosa
- Pawpaw sphinx, Dolba hyloeus
- Northern pine sphinx, Lapara bombycoides
- Cluentius sphinx, Neococytius cluentius
- Modest sphinx, Pachysphinx modesta
- Blinded sphinx, Paonias excaecatus
- Small-eyed sphinx, Paonias myops
- One-eyed sphinx, Smerinthus cerisyi
- Twin-spotted sphinx, Smerinthus jamaicensis
- Canadian sphinx, Sphinx canadensis
- Great ash sphinx, Sphinx chersis
- Wild cherry sphinx, Sphinx drupiferarum
- Hermit sphinx, Sphinx eremitus
- Laurel sphinx, Sphinx kalmiae
- Poecila sphinx, Sphinx poecila

=== Yponomeutidae ===
- Ailanthus webworm moth, Atteva aurea
