= List of moths of Canada (Sphingidae) =

Partial list of Canadian moths

This is a list of the moths of family Sphingidae that are found in Canada. It also acts as an index to the species articles and forms part of the full List of moths of Canada.

Following the species name, there is an abbreviation that indicates the Canadian provinces or territories in which the species can be found.

- Western Canada
  - BC = British Columbia
  - AB = Alberta
  - SK = Saskatchewan
  - MB = Manitoba
  - YT = Yukon
  - NT = Northwest Territories
  - NU = Nunavut
- Eastern Canada
  - ON = Ontario
  - QC = Quebec
  - NB = New Brunswick
  - NS = Nova Scotia
  - PE = Prince Edward Island
  - NF = Newfoundland
  - LB = Labrador

== Subfamily Macroglossinae ==
- Aellopos fadus (Cramer, 1776)-ON
- Aellopos tantalus (Linnaeus, 1758)-MB
- Aellopos titan (Cramer, 1777)-QC, ON
- Erinnyis alope (Drury, 1773)-SK
- Erinnyis ello (Linnaeus, 1758)-QC, ON
- Erinnyis obscura (Fabricius, 1775)-ON
- Hemaris diffinis (Boisduval, 1836)-NS, NB, QC, ON, MB, SK, AB, BC, NT
- Hemaris gracilis (Grote & Robinson, 1865)-NS, PE, NB, QC, ON, MB, SK
- Hemaris senta (Strecker, 1878)-BC
- Hemaris thysbe (Fabricius, 1775)-NF, LB, NS, PE, NB, QC, ON, MB, SK, AB, BC, NT, YT
- Amphion floridensis Clark, 1920-NS, PE, NB, QC, ON, MB, AB
- Darapsa choerilus (Cramer, [1780])-NS, PE, NB, QC, ON, MB, SK, AB, BC
- Darapsa myron (Cramer, 1780)-NS, QC, ON, MB
- Darapsa versicolor (Harris, 1839)-QC, ON
- Deidamia inscripta (Harris, 1839)-QC, ON
- Deilephila elpenor (Linnaeus, 1758)-BC
- Eumorpha achemon (Drury, 1773)-QC, ON, MB
- Eumorpha fasciatus (Sulzer, 1776)-NS, NB, ON
- Eumorpha labruscae (Linnaeus, 1758)-NB, MB, SK
- Eumorpha pandorus (Hübner, 1821)-NS, ON
- Hyles euphorbiae (Linnaeus, 1758)-ON, SK, AB
- Hyles gallii (Rottemburg, 1775)-LB, NS, PE, NB, QC, ON, MB, SK, AB, BC, NT, YT
- Hyles lineata (Fabricius, 1775)-NS, NB, QC, ON, MB, SK, AB, BC
- Proserpinus clarkiae (Boisduval, 1852)-AB, BC
- Proserpinus flavofasciata (Walker, 1856)-NS, NB, QC, ON, MB, SK, AB, BC, NT
- Proserpinus juanita (Strecker, 1877)-MB, SK, AB
- Sphecodina abbottii (Swainson, 1821)-QC, ON
- Xylophanes tersa (Linnaeus, 1771)-QC, ON

== Subfamily Smerinthinae ==
- Amorpha juglandis (Smith, 1797)-NS, NB, QC, ON, MB
- Pachysphinx modesta (Harris, 1839)-LB, NS, PE, NB, QC, ON, MB, SK, AB, BC
- Pachysphinx occidentalis (Edwards, 1875)-AB
- Paonias astylus (Drury, 1773)-NS
- Paonias excaecata (Smith, 1797)-LB, NS, PE, NB, QC, ON, MB, SK, AB, BC
- Paonias myops (Smith, 1797)-NS, PE, NB, QC, ON, MB, SK, AB, BC
- Smerinthus cerisyi Kirby, 1837-NF, NS, PE, NB, QC, ON, MB, SK, AB, BC, NT, YT
- Smerinthus jamaicensis (Drury, 1773)-NF, LB, NS, PE, NB, QC, ON, MB, SK, AB, BC, YT

== Subfamily Sphinginae ==
- Agrius cingulata (Fabricius, 1775)-NS, NB, QC, ON, BC
- Ceratomia amyntor (Geyer, 1835)-NS, NB, QC, ON, MB, SK
- Ceratomia catalpae (Boisduval, 1875)-ON
- Ceratomia undulosa (Walker, 1856)-NS, PE, NB, QC, ON, MB, SK, AB
- Dolba hyloeus (Drury, 1773)- NB, QC, ON
- Lapara bombycoides Walker, 1856-NS, PE, NB, QC, ON, MB, SK, AB
- Manduca quinquemaculata (Haworth, 1803)-NS, QC, ON, SK, BC
- Manduca rustica (Fabricius, 1775)-QC
- Manduca sexta (Linnaeus, 1763)-ON
- Paratrea plebeja (Fabricius, 1777)-ON
- Sphinx canadensis Boisduval, 1875-NB, QC, ON, MB
- Sphinx chersis (Hübner, 1823)-NS, NB, QC, ON, MB, SK, AB, BC
- Sphinx drupiferarum Smith, 1797-NS, PE, NB, QC, ON, MB, SK, BC
- Sphinx eremitus (Hübner, 1823)-NS, QC, ON
- Sphinx gordius Cramer, 1780-ON, MB, SK
- Sphinx kalmiae Smith, 1797-NF, NS, PE, NB, QC, ON, MB, SK
- Sphinx luscitiosa Clemens, 1859-NS, NB, QC, ON, MB, SK, AB, YT
- Sphinx perelegans Edwards, 1874-BC
- Sphinx pinastri Linnaeus, 1758-AB
- Sphinx poecila Stephens, 1828-LB, NS, PE, NB, QC, ON, MB, SK, AB, BC
- Sphinx vashti Strecker, 1878-MB, SK, AB, BC
