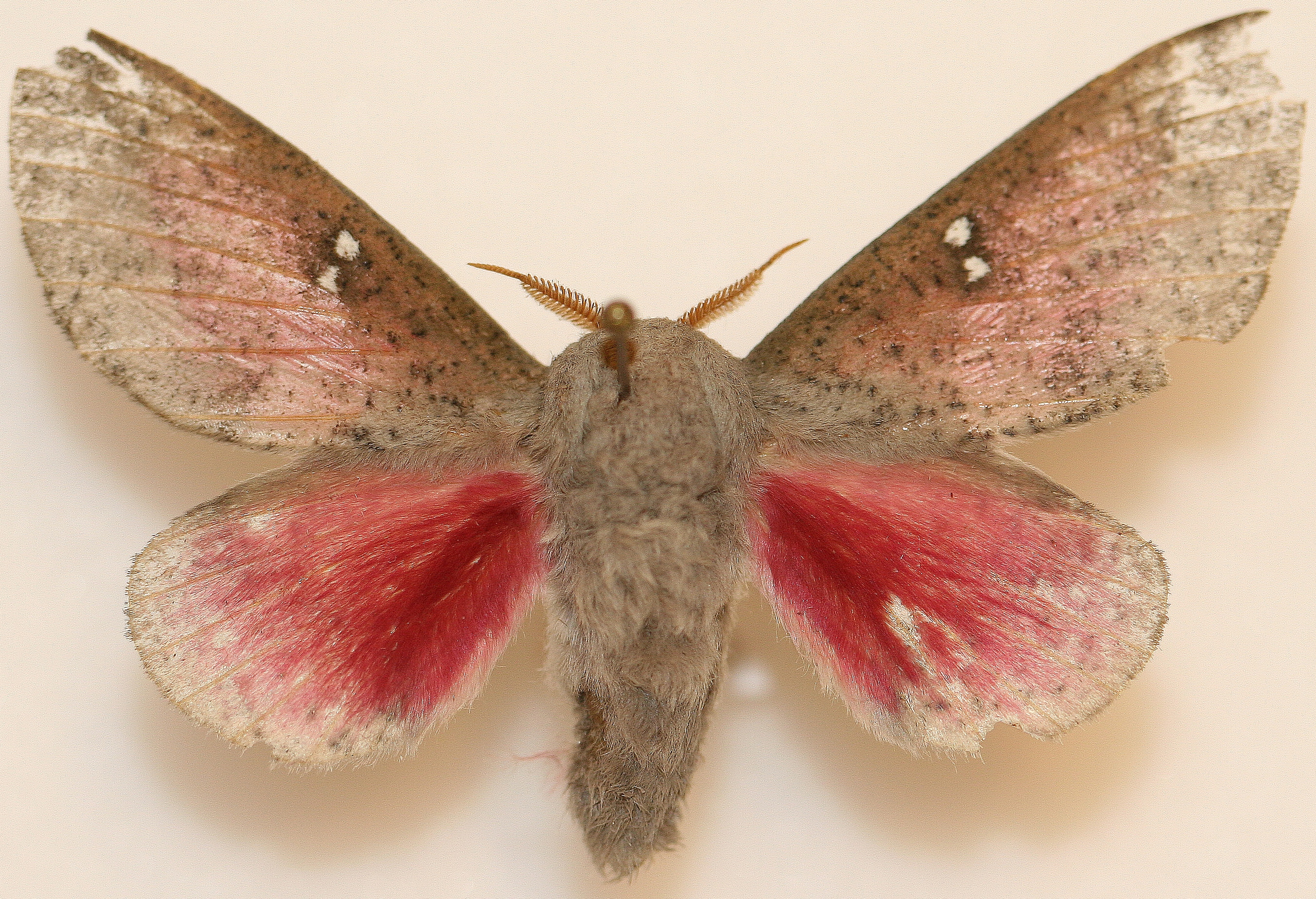

Scientific classification
- Domain: Eukaryota
- Kingdom: Animalia
- Phylum: Arthropoda
- Class: Insecta
- Order: Lepidoptera
- Family: Saturniidae
- Genus: Syssphinx
- Species: S. bicolor

Binomial name
- Syssphinx bicolor (Harris, 1841)

Synonyms
- Dryocampa bicolor Harris, 1841; Sphingicampa bicolor; Sphingicampa distigma Walsh, 1864; Syssphinx immaculata Jewett, 1882; Sphingicampa suprema Neumoegen, 1885

= Syssphinx bicolor =

Honey locust moth

Species of moth

Syssphinx bicolor, the honey locust moth, is a North American moth in the family Saturniidae.

== Description ==
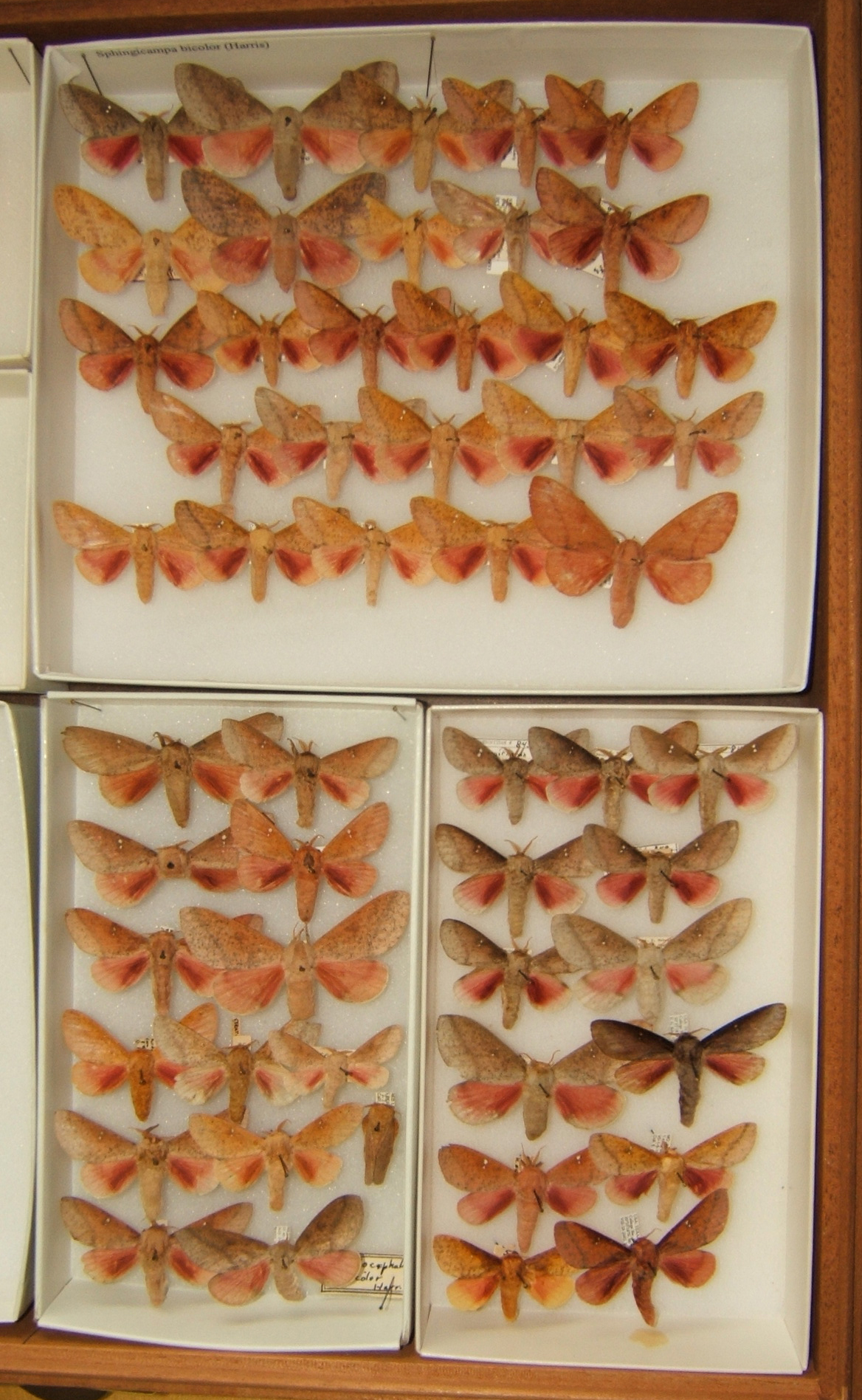
Honey locust moth variation

The wings vary from a grayish color to yellow to orange to dark reddish brown, with a variable amount of black spotting and pinkish shading. The forewing postmedial line runs to the costa before the apex. On the forewing, the white reniform spot may be double, single, or may be lacking. The wingspan measures 4.7–6.7 centimetres (1.9–2.6 in).

== Similar species ==
The only similar species in the honey locust moth's range is the bisected honey locust moth (Sphingicampa bisecta).

The bisected honey locust moth is usually a little bit larger, has a straighter, more conspicuous postmedial line that runs to the costa at the apex, and lacks a white reniform spot.

== Habitat ==
The honey locust moth is mainly found in woodlands.

== Flight ==
This moth is on the wing from April to September.

== Life cycle ==
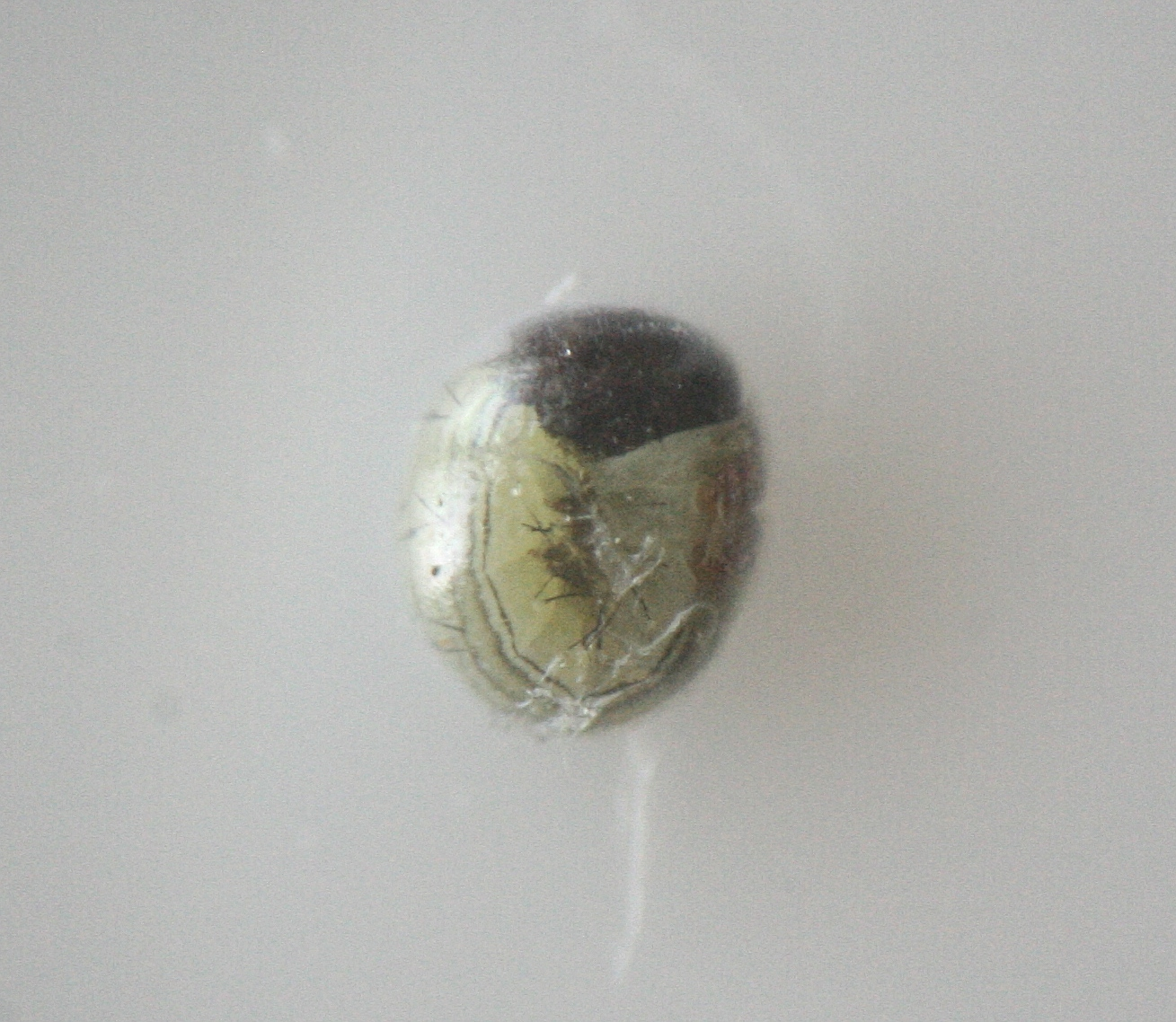
Egg

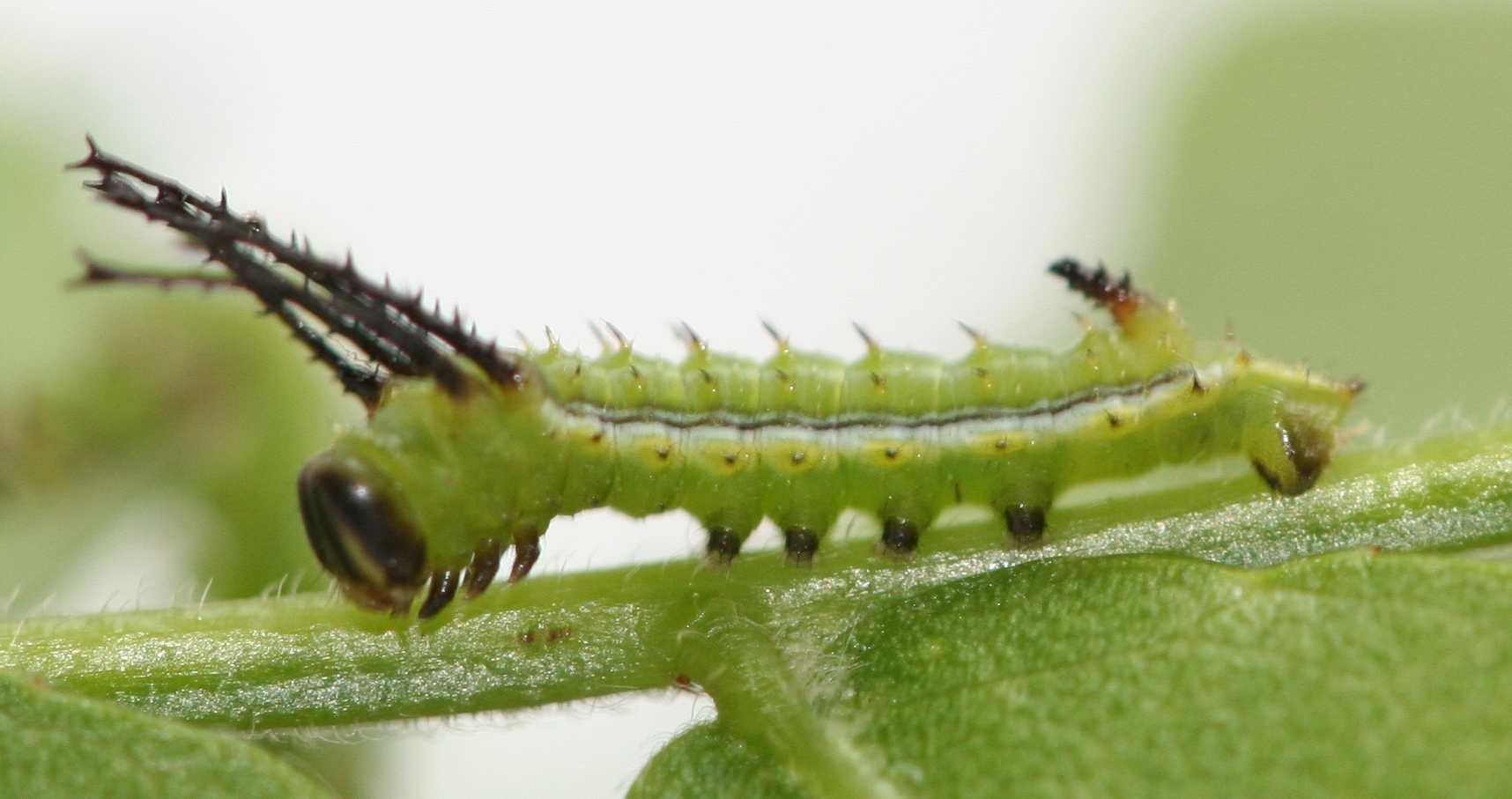
2nd instar larva

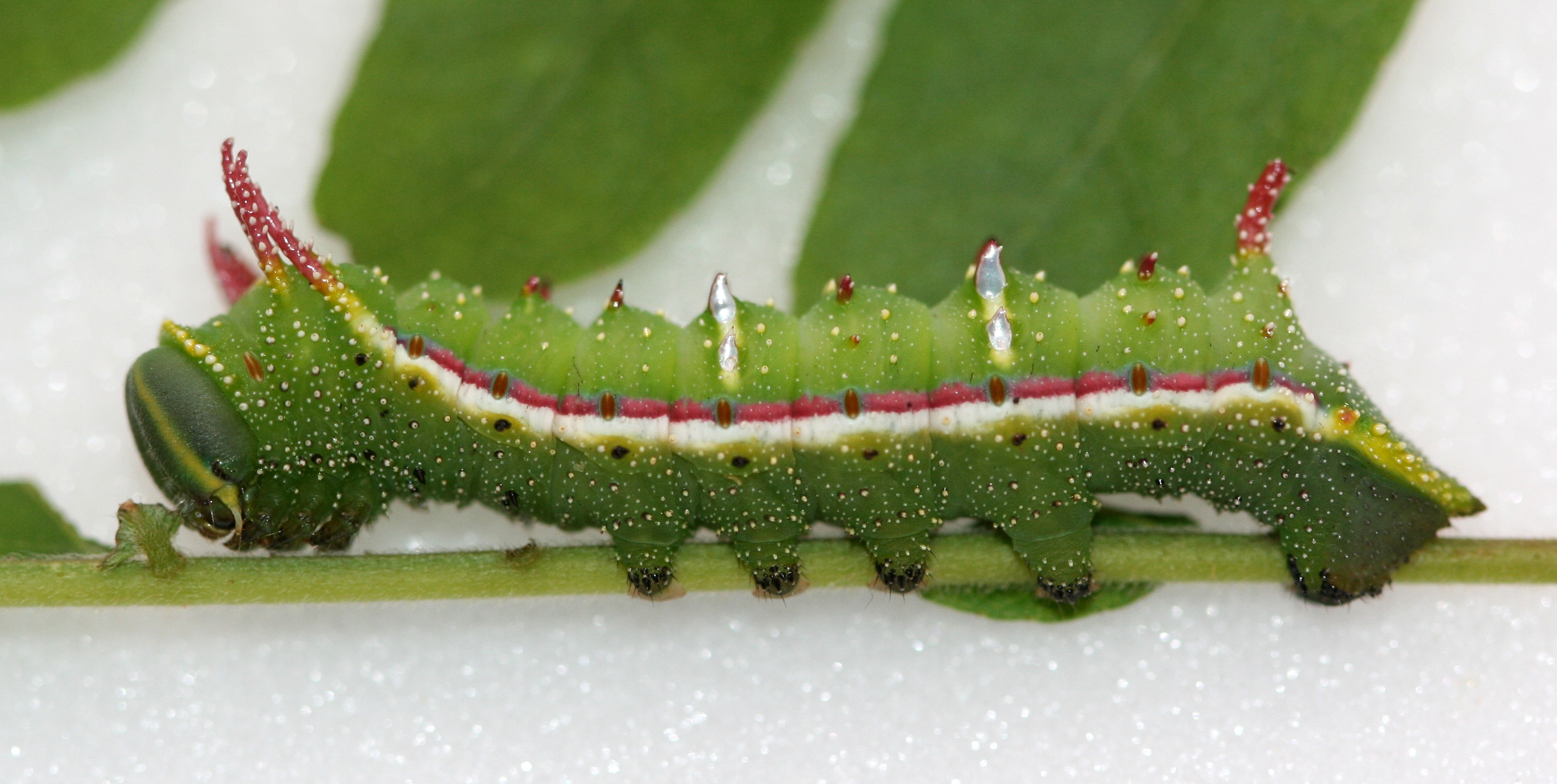
Last instar larva

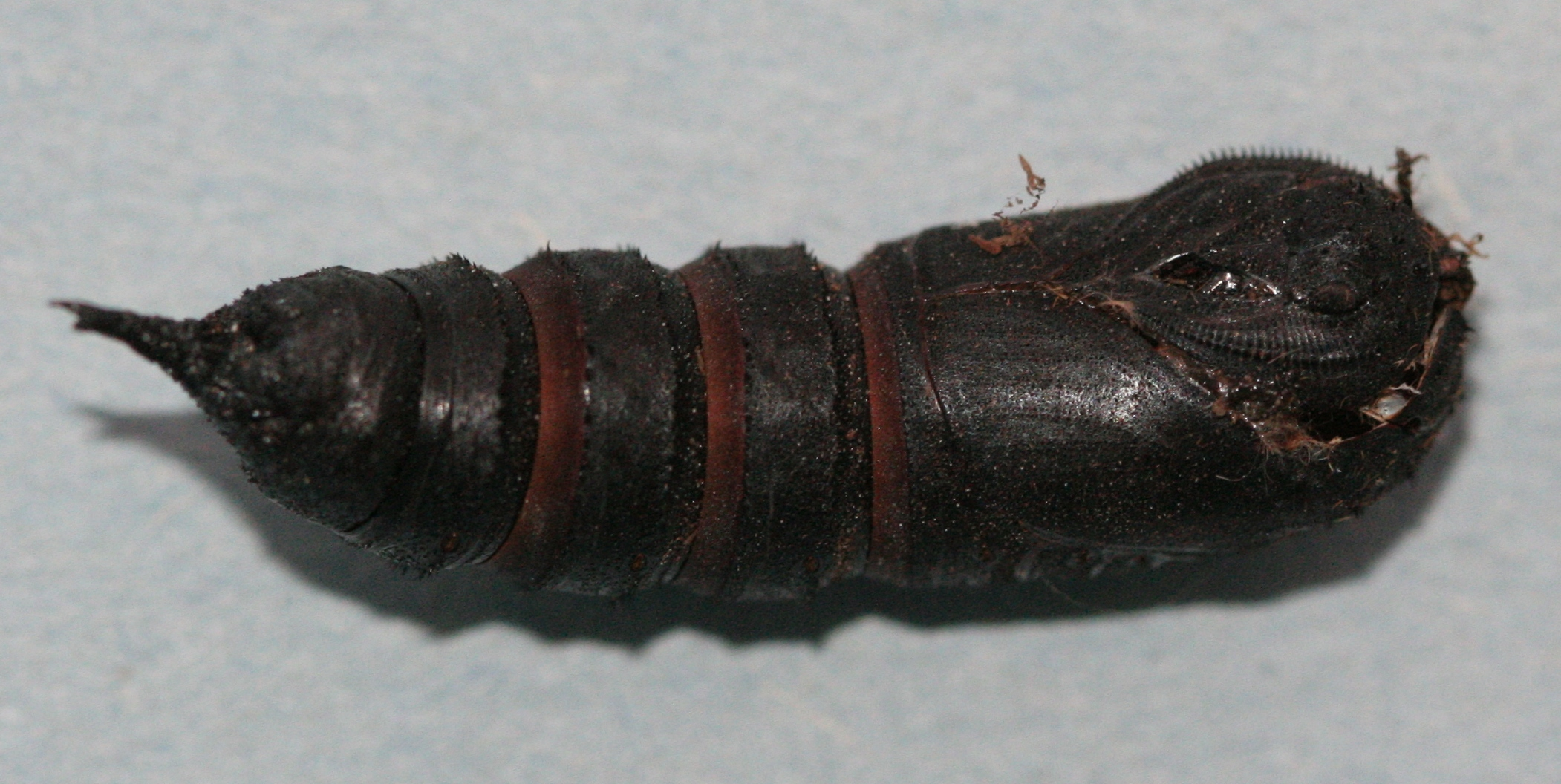
Chrysalis

The eggs are pale green and are laid in clusters on the host plant leaves. The young gregarious larvae are pale green with four pairs of black thoracic filaments and a black horn on the end of the abdomen. They also have a lateral stripe which is mainly white. The older solitary larvae are grass green with two pairs of red horns on the thorax and one on the end of the abdomen. There are a number of silvered horns across the abdomen. The supraspiracular stripe is red and white. The body is dotted with white spots. The very similar-looking Bisected honey locust moth larva has green horns and lacks the red in the supraspiracular stripe. The dark chrysalis is made in a cell under ground. It hibernates as a chrysalis. The honey locust moth has three broods per year, the first adults being grayish, the second yellow to orange brown, and the third being darker with more spotting.

== Host plants ==
Here is a list of host plants used by the honey locust moth:

- Honey locust, Gleditsia triacanthos
- Kentucky coffee tree, Gymnocladus dioicus
