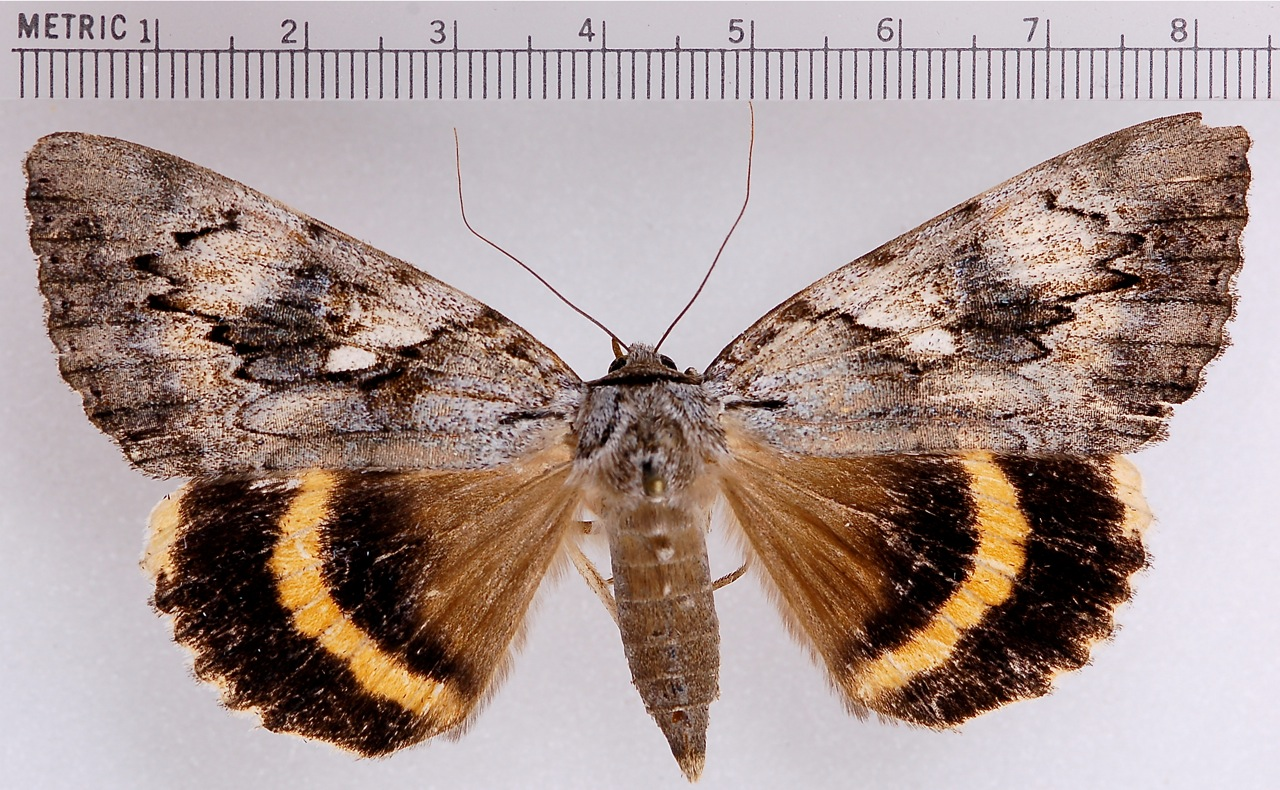
- Mounted specimen
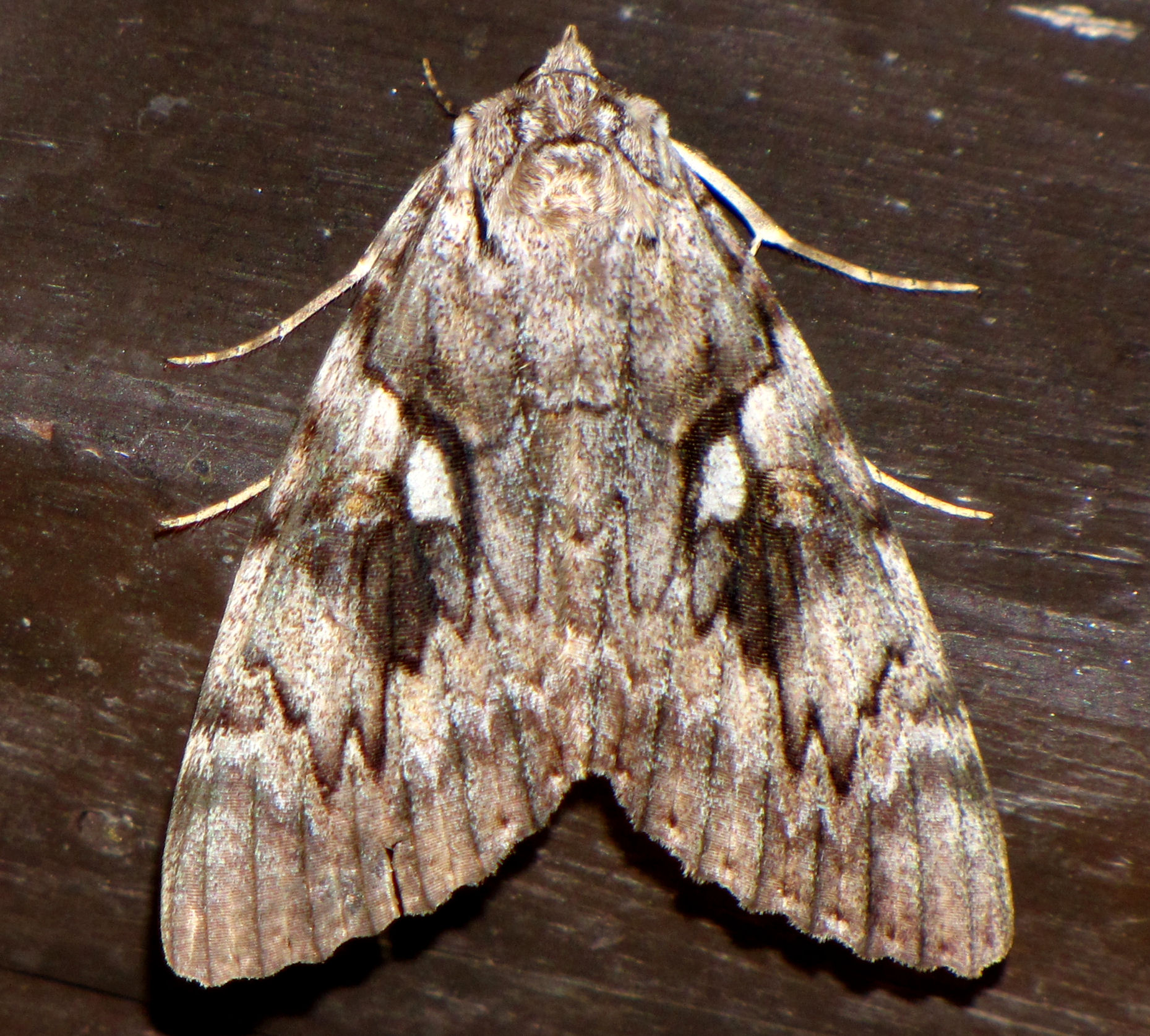
- Live specimen

Scientific classification
- Kingdom: Animalia
- Phylum: Arthropoda
- Class: Insecta
- Order: Lepidoptera
- Superfamily: Noctuoidea
- Family: Erebidae
- Genus: Catocala
- Species: C. cerogama

Binomial name
- Catocala cerogama Guenée, 1852

Synonyms
- Catocala bunkeri Grote, 1876; Catocala ruperti Franclemont, 1938; Catocala cerogama var. aurella Fischer, 1885; Catocala cerogama var. eliza Fischer, 1885

= Catocala cerogama =

Yellow-banded underwing

Species of moth

Catocala cerogama, the yellow-banded underwing, is a moth of the tribe Catocalini that occurs in North America. The species was first described by Achille Guenée in 1852.

== Description ==
The wingspan is 64 to 81 mm. They have even, deep yellow bands on their hindwings, the forewings are usually brownish gray. Look for a pale band that connects the whitish subreniform a spot to the costa.

== Range ==
As far north as Nova Scotia south to North Carolina, west to Manitoba, South Dakota, and Missouri.

== Life cycle ==
The adults fly between July and October.

=== Larval foods ===
- American basswood
