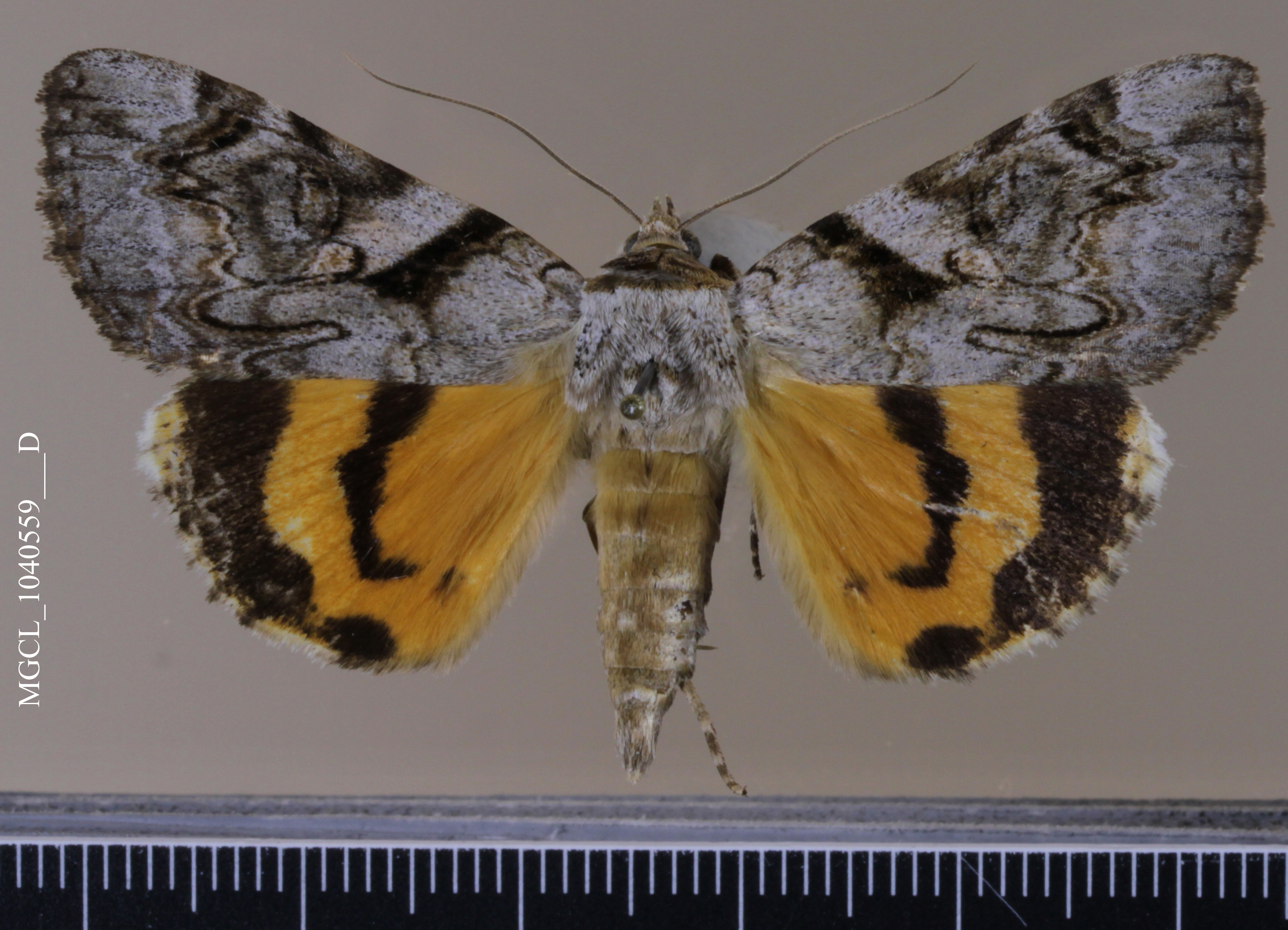

Scientific classification
- Kingdom: Animalia
- Phylum: Arthropoda
- Class: Insecta
- Order: Lepidoptera
- Superfamily: Noctuoidea
- Family: Erebidae
- Genus: Catocala
- Species: C. amestris

Binomial name
- Catocala amestris Strecker, 1874

Synonyms
- Catocala anna Grote, 1874; Catocala westcottii Grote, 1878

= Catocala amestris =

Three-staff underwing

Species of moth

Catocala amestris, the three-staff underwing, is a species of Catocalini that occurs in North America. It is considered endangered and is legally protected in the state of Michigan.

== Description ==
Like most underwings, C. amestris has a brightly colored hindwing and brownish-gray forewings, the wingspan is 1.6-1.8in (4-4.5 cm). The forewings have a blotch that strongly resembles a kidney shape, beyond that the wing has mixed wavy lines. The hindwings have two wavy black lines separating a yellow-orange coloration. The caterpillar of this species is bluish white with a yellowish coloring on the dorsum, or top side. It also has an orange band along with 7 thin black lines on its sides.

== Habitat ==
Between June and August this moth can be seen in dry-mesic prairie lands and oak forest. Due to only having one genus of host plant, Amorpha spp., the moth is hard to find in even these areas.
