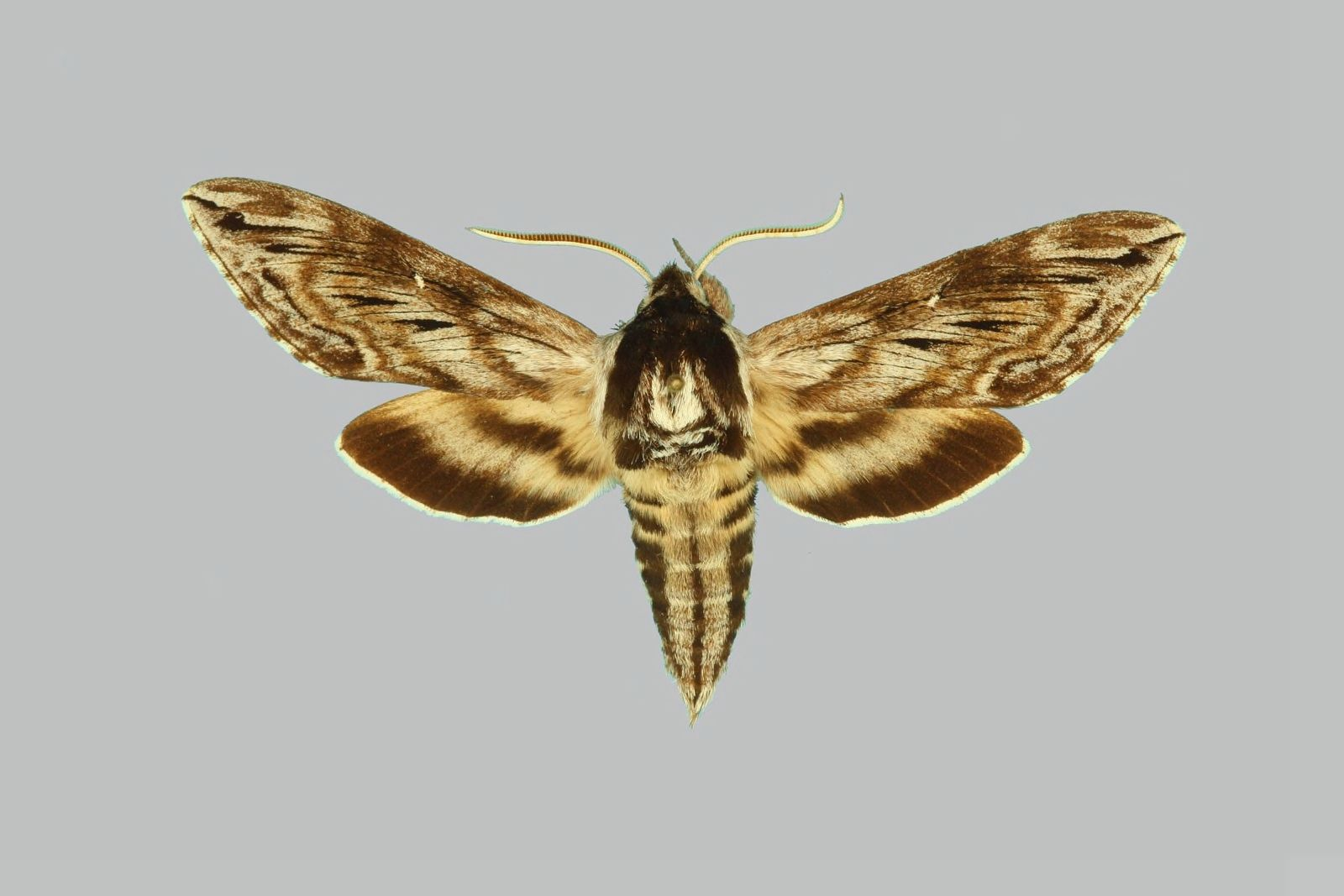

Scientific classification
- Domain: Eukaryota
- Kingdom: Animalia
- Phylum: Arthropoda
- Class: Insecta
- Order: Lepidoptera
- Family: Sphingidae
- Genus: Sphinx
- Species: S. poecila

Binomial name
- Sphinx poecila Stephens, 1828

Synonyms
- Sphinx gordius borealis Clark, 1920; Sphinx poecila coxeyi (Cadbury, 1931)

= Sphinx poecila =

Poecila sphinx

Species of moth

Sphinx poecila, the poecila sphinx, is a moth of the family Sphingidae. It is found from Newfoundland and Maine south to Pennsylvania and west to Michigan, northeastern Illinois and Wisconsin.

The wingspan is 68–95 mm.

The larvae feed on Rosa carolina, Picea glauca, Larix laricina and Alnus, Malus, Myrica and Vaccinium species.
