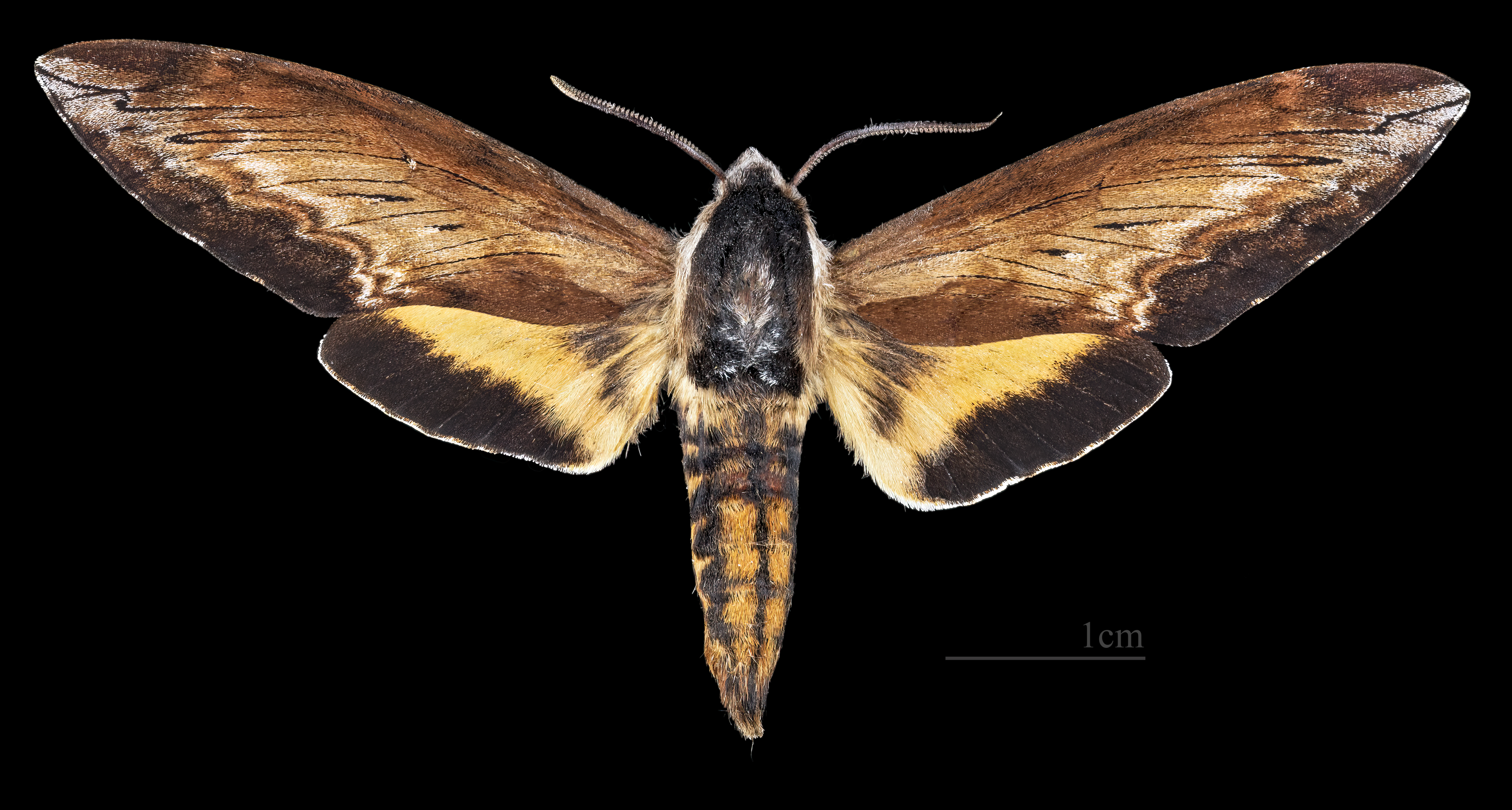
- Sphinx luscitiosa♂
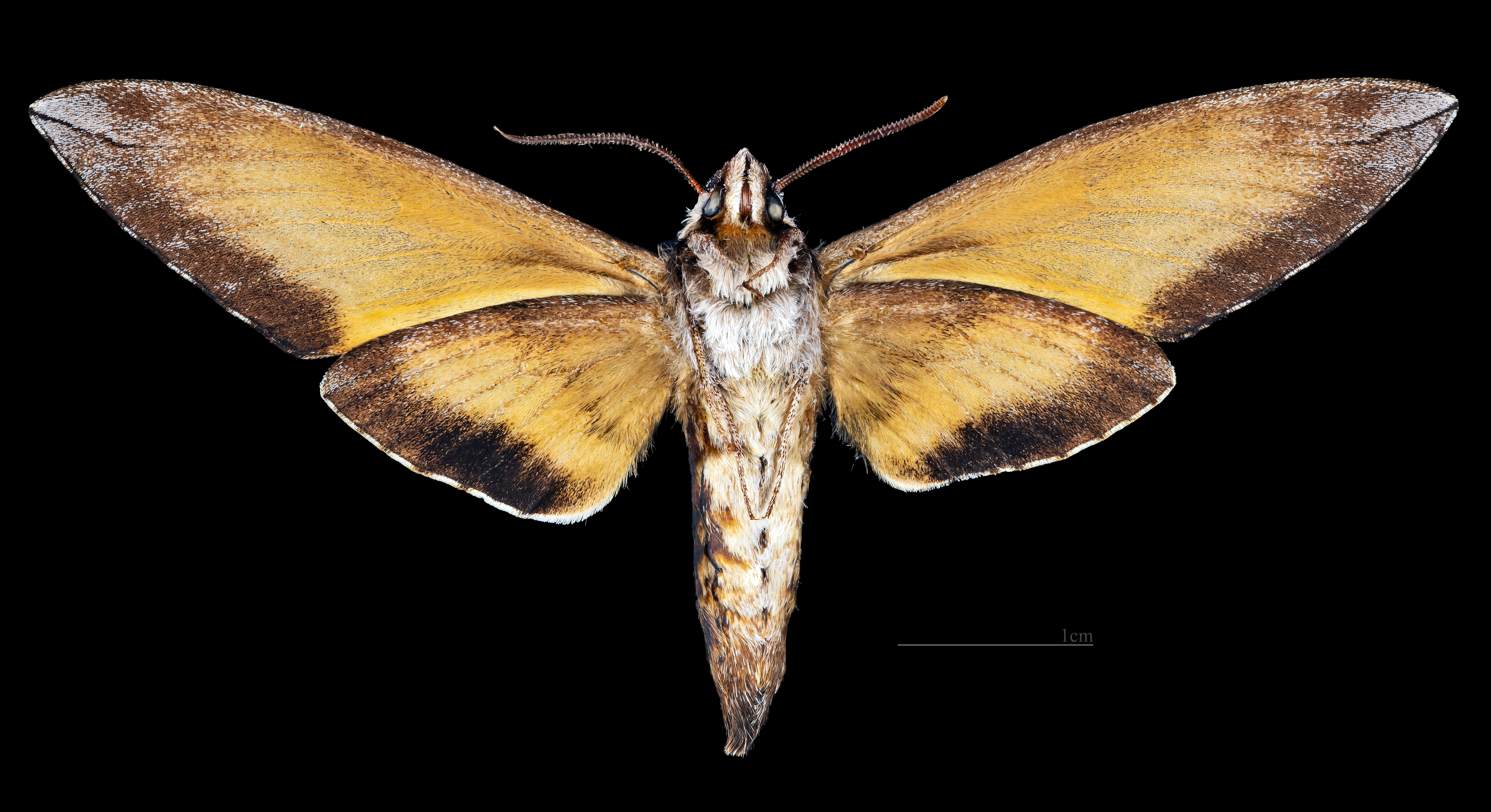
- Sphinx luscitiosa♂ △

Scientific classification
- Domain: Eukaryota
- Kingdom: Animalia
- Phylum: Arthropoda
- Class: Insecta
- Order: Lepidoptera
- Family: Sphingidae
- Genus: Sphinx
- Species: S. luscitiosa

Binomial name
- Sphinx luscitiosa Clemens, 1859

Synonyms
- Sphinx luscitiosa benjamini Clark, 1932; Sphinx luscitiosa bombax Barnes & Benjamin, 1927; Sphinx luscitiosa borealis Clark, 1931; Sphinx luscitiosa una (Skinner, 1903)

= Sphinx luscitiosa =

Clemens' hawkmoth

Species of moth

Sphinx luscitiosa, or Clemens' hawkmoth, is a moth of the family Sphingidae. The species was first described by James Brackenridge Clemens in 1859. It is found in North America from Nova Scotia south to New Jersey, west through Michigan, Wisconsin and the northern plains to Alberta, Saskatchewan and Montana and south to Utah. It has been taken as far north as Yukon.

The wingspan is 56–80 mm. There is one generation per year with adults on wing from June to July.

The larvae feed on Salix, Populus, Malus, Fraxinus, Morella and Betula species.
