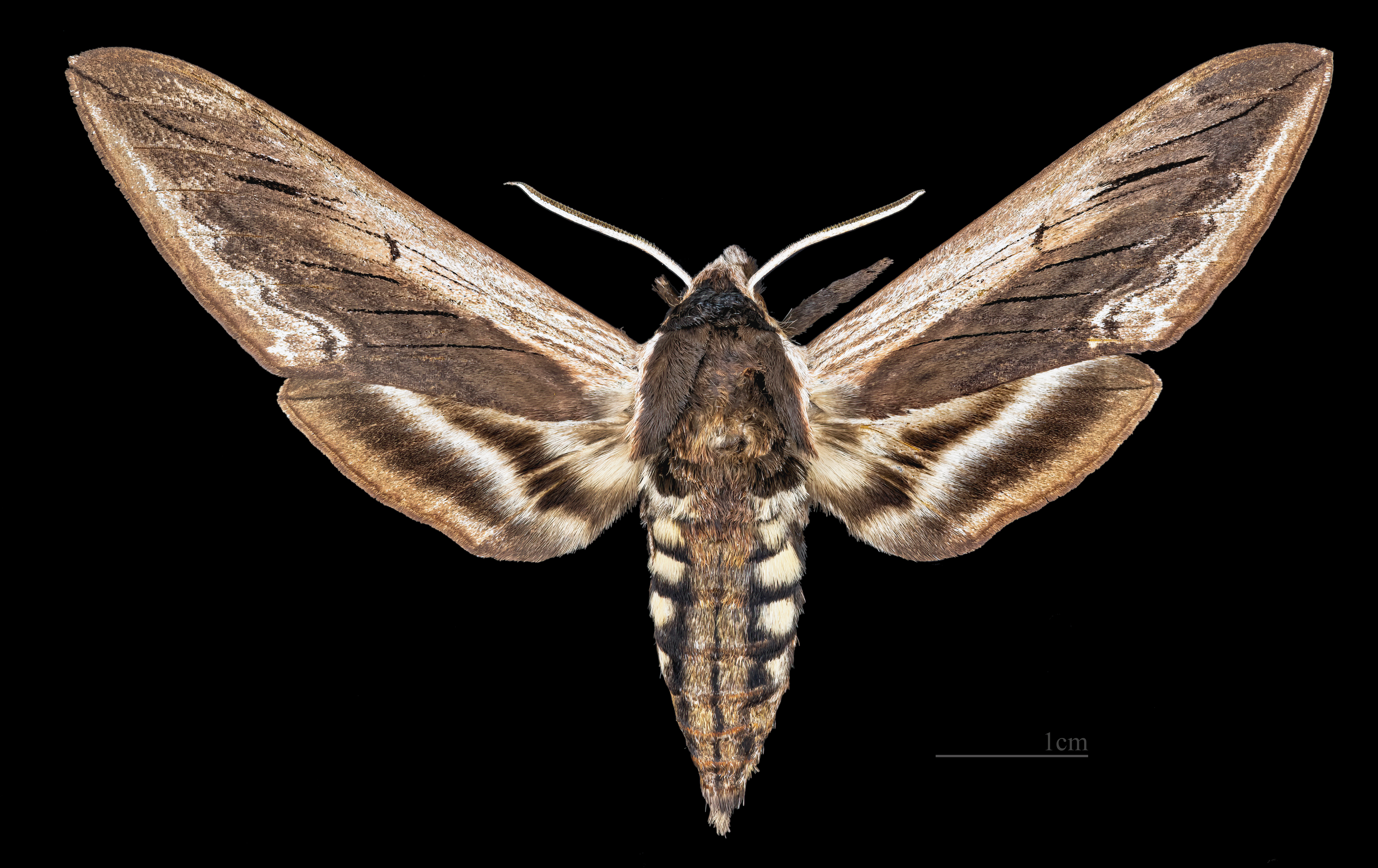
- Sphinx drupiferarum
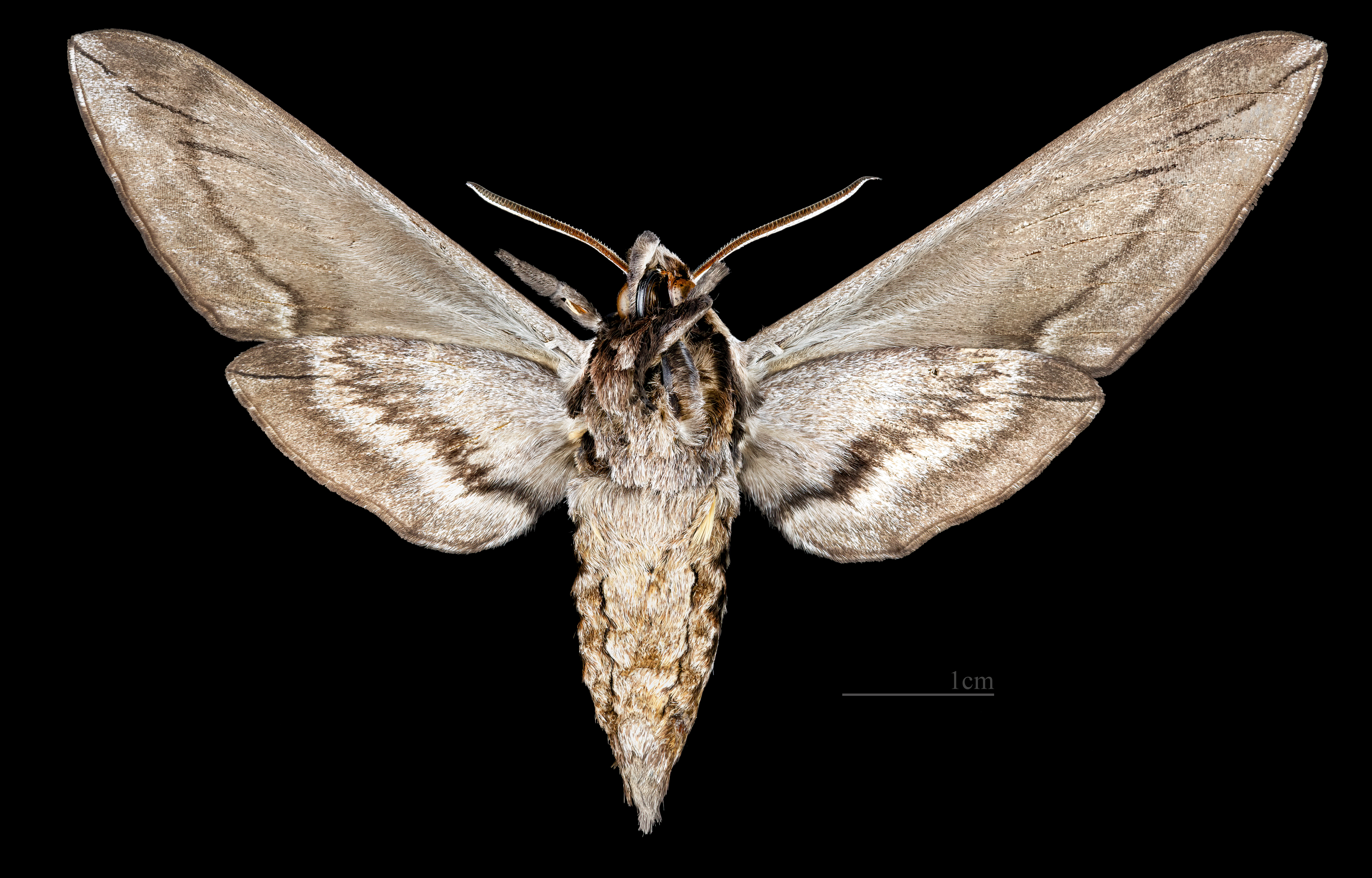
- Sphinx drupiferarum ♂ △

Scientific classification
- Kingdom: Animalia
- Phylum: Arthropoda
- Class: Insecta
- Order: Lepidoptera
- Family: Sphingidae
- Genus: Sphinx
- Species: S. drupiferarum

Binomial name
- Sphinx drupiferarum J. E. Smith, 1797

Synonyms
- Sphinx utahensis Edwards, 1881; Sphinx drupiferarum marginalis Clark, 1936

= Sphinx drupiferarum =

Wild cherry sphinx

Species of moth

Sphinx drupiferarum, the wild cherry sphinx, is a moth of the family Sphingidae. The species was first described by James Edward Smith in 1797.

== Distribution ==
It is found from the temperate parts of the United States to southern Canada.

== Description ==
The wingspan is 75–115 mm. In Canada, there is one generation per year with adults on wing from June to July. In the south, there are two generations per year.

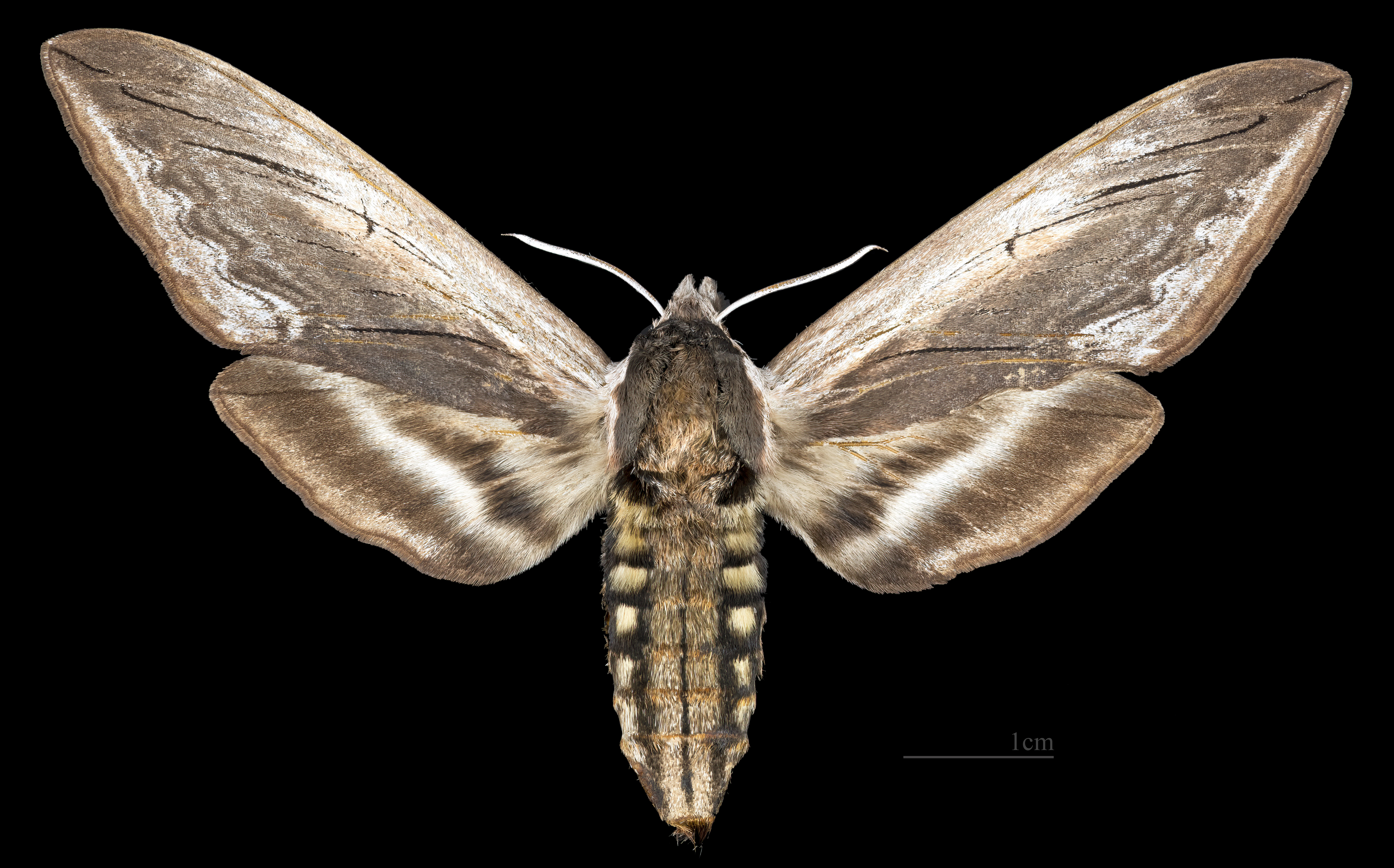
Sphinx drupiferarum ♀

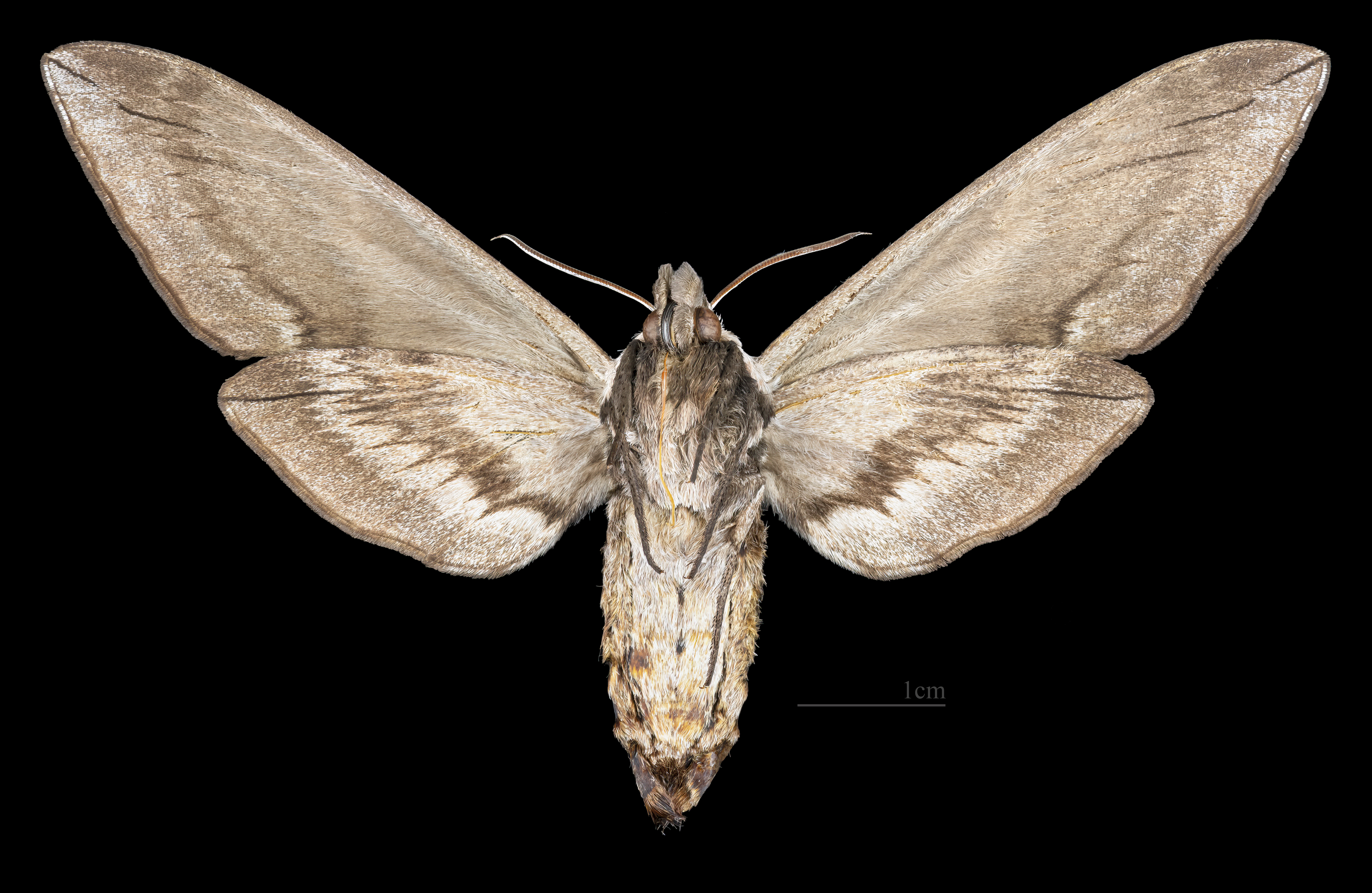
Sphinx drupiferarum ♀ △

== Biology ==
The larvae feed on Prunus (including Prunus serotina), Malus, Syringa vulgaris, Amelanchier nantuckensis and Celtis occidentalis.
