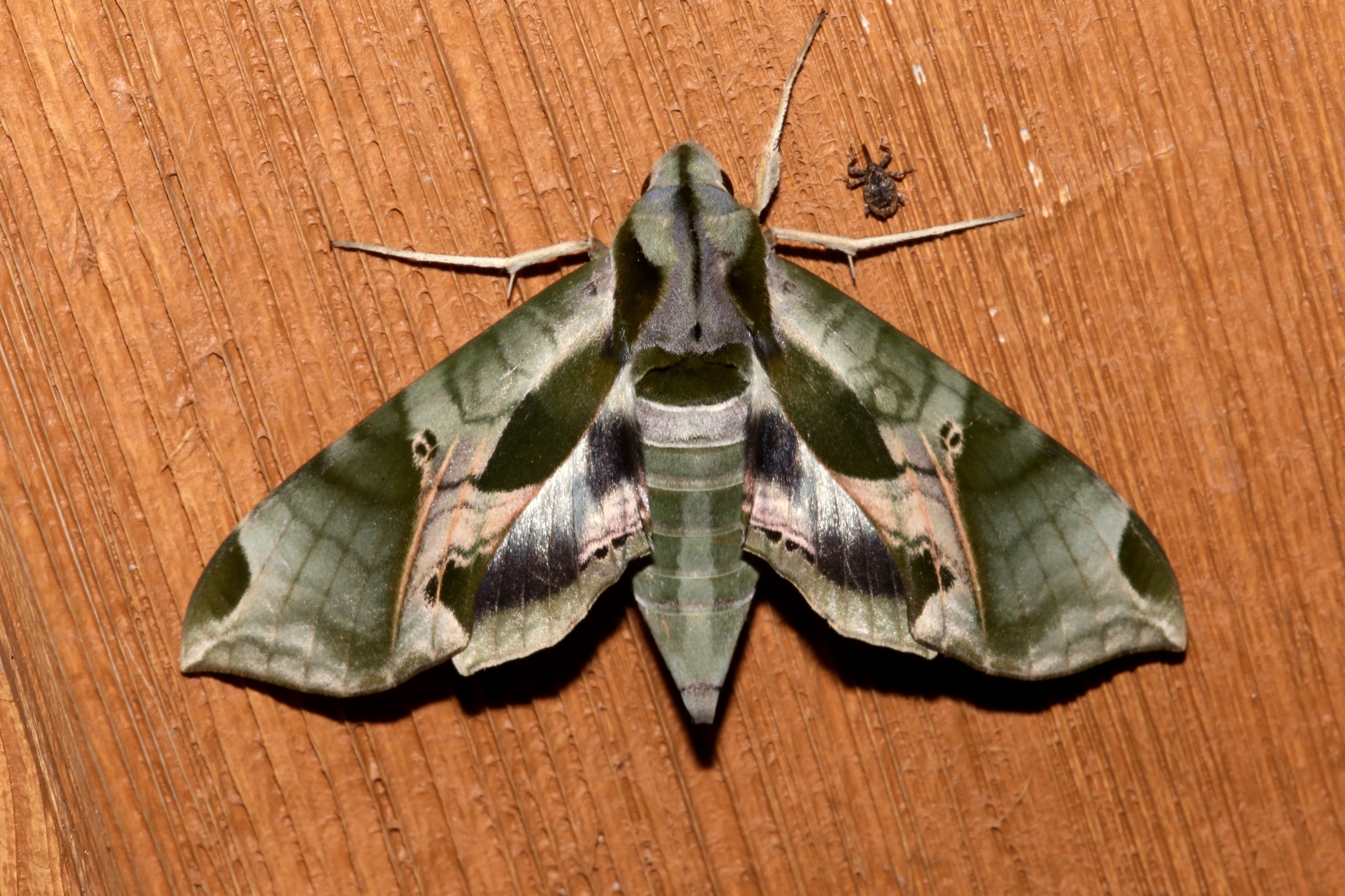

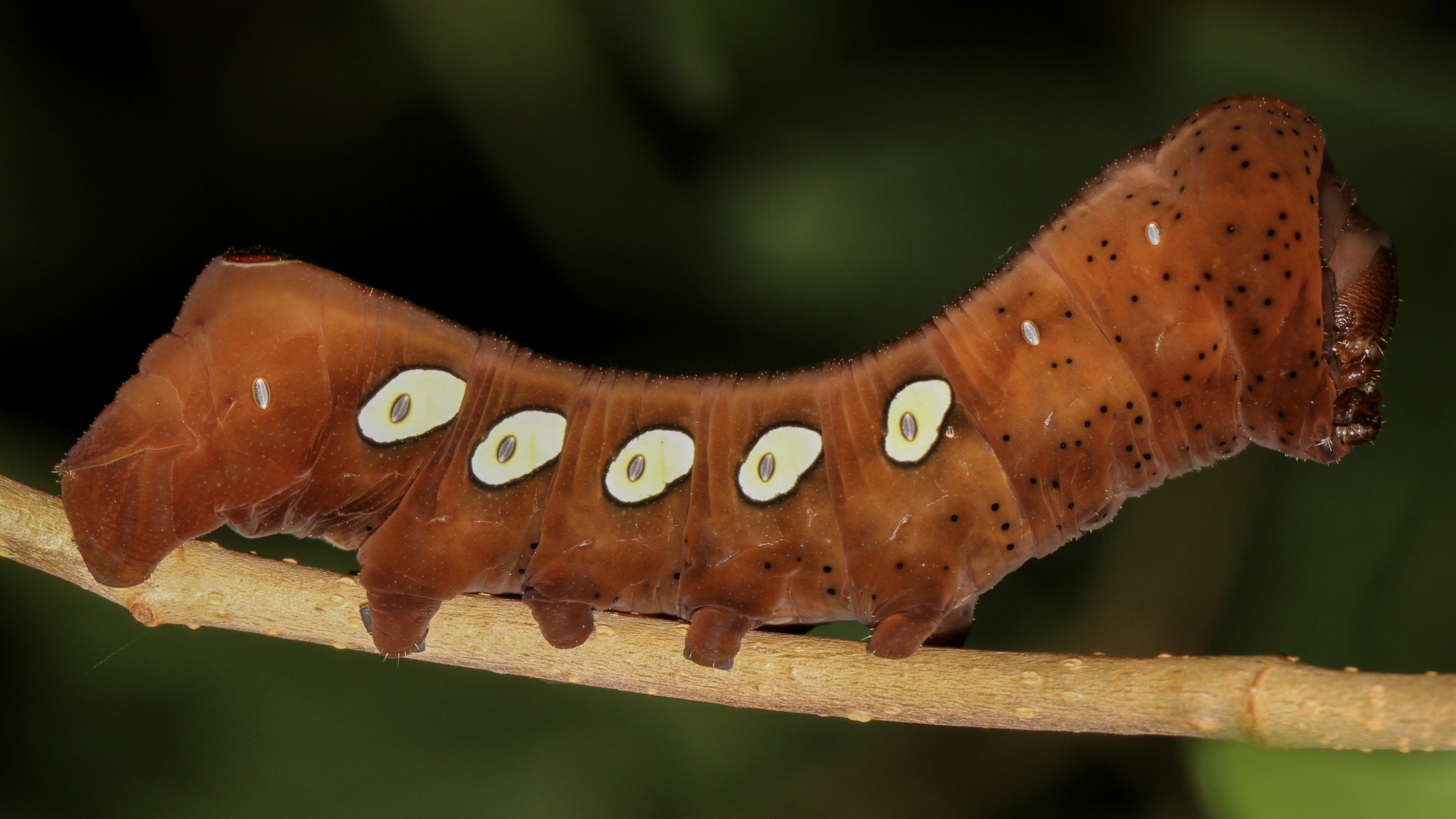

Scientific classification
- Kingdom: Animalia
- Phylum: Arthropoda
- Class: Insecta
- Order: Lepidoptera
- Family: Sphingidae
- Genus: Eumorpha
- Species: E. pandorus

Binomial name
- Eumorpha pandorus (Hübner, 1821)

Synonyms
- Daphnis pandorus Hübner, 1821; Philampelus pandorus ampelophaga Walker, 1856

= Eumorpha pandorus =

Species of moth

Eumorpha pandorus, the Pandora sphinx moth or Pandorus sphinx moth, is a North American moth in the family Sphingidae. The species was first described by Jacob Hübner in 1821.

== Description ==
The pandora sphinx moth has a wingspan of 3.25–4.6 inches (8.3–11.7 cm). Its wings are opaque and have a greenish-olive background on the dorsal surfaces. The wings are narrow and are held deltaform at rest. Females generally have a larger abdomen than males. There are green markings on the dorsal forewing with a two-toned double spot extending from the base along the forewing's inner margin. When the wings are folded, the latter spot aligns with a dark mark on the moth's body that covers each tegula. A green marking with a pale outline is visible near the apex of the forewing. The dorsal surfaces of the hindwings, when extended, reveal black patches on a white background that becomes greenish-olive near the termens. Pink is present around the torni of the hindwings and in isolated areas on the dorsal forewings. Small dark eyespots on the hindwings and the forewings, there found in the discal position bearing two tiny "pupils," are visible even when the wings are folded. The ventral surfaces of the wings are a pale shade of yellow-green or brown.

E. pandorus shares the southern part of its range with E. intermedia. It is distinguished from the latter species by the shape of the darker portion of its basal two-toned spot on the end that faces the forewing's outer margin: it is strongly wing-shaped in E. intermedia due to the shorter length of the spot's inferior border in comparison to its superior border, whereas the spot is more rectangular overall in E. pandorus. In addition, the faint subterminal line on the forewing (located just basal to the apical spot) is typically scalloped in E. intermedia but is straight or slightly sinusoidal in E. pandorus.

Caterpillars grow up to 9 centimetres (3.5 in) and are green in the first instar, but may be one of a variety of colors in later instars, including green or brownish-red. The head and first two thoracic segments can be retracted into the third segment. The abdomen has a small spot on the second segment and big white oval spots overlying the last five spiracles. They also have the characteristic "horn" of the Sphingidae hornworms with its base on an eyespot at the end of their abdomen, although only the raised eyespot is present in the last larval instar.

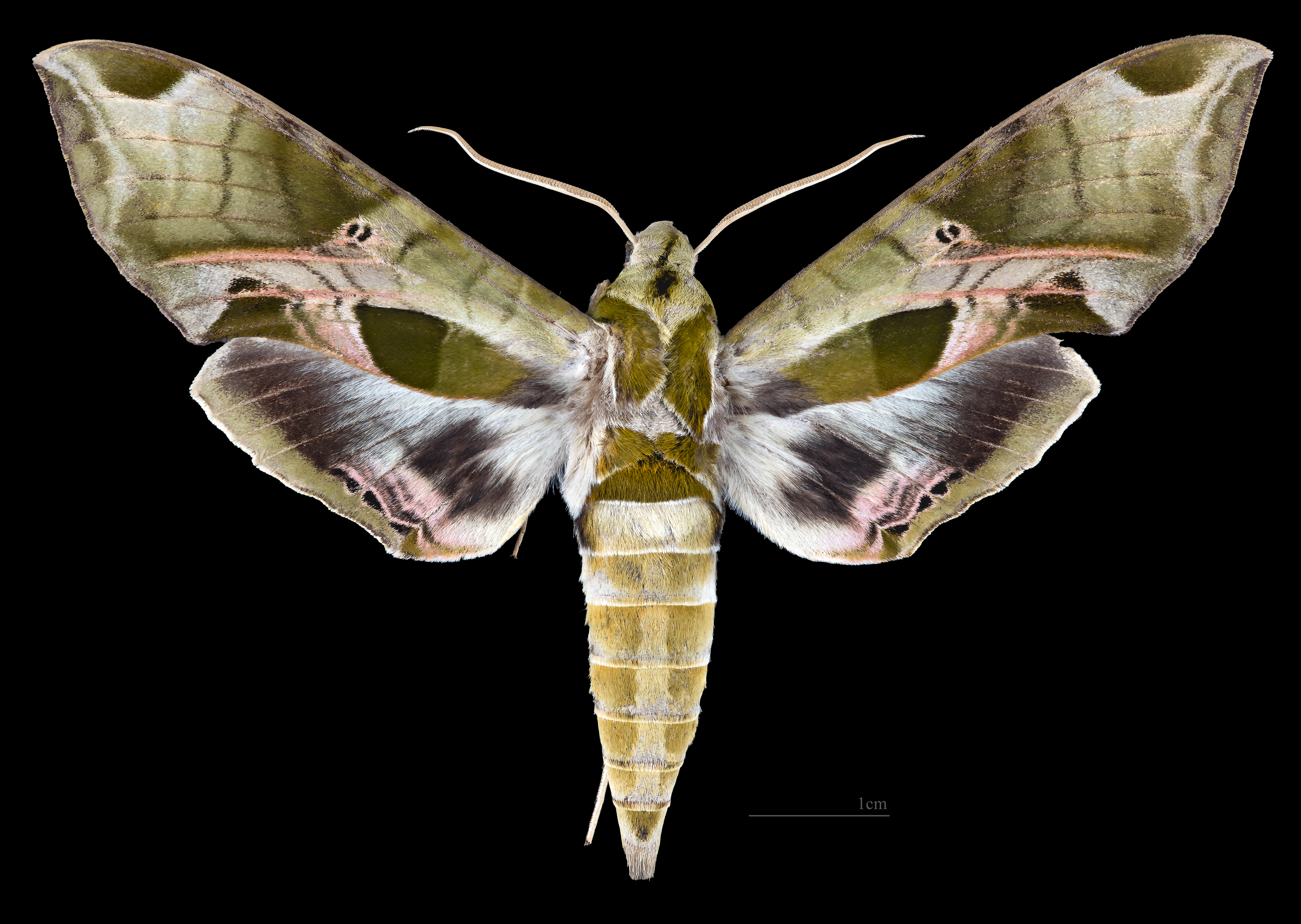
Male dorsal

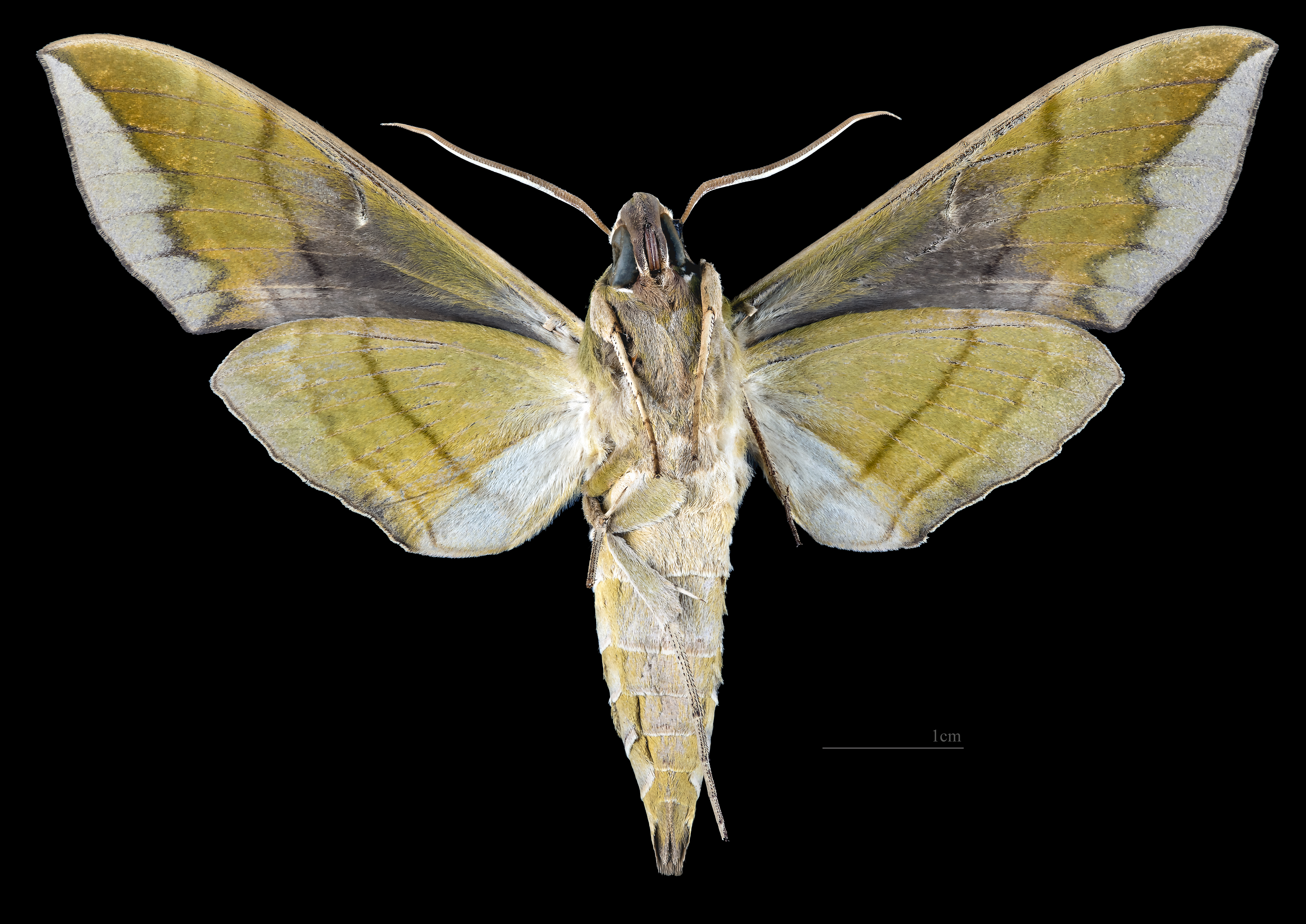
Male ventral

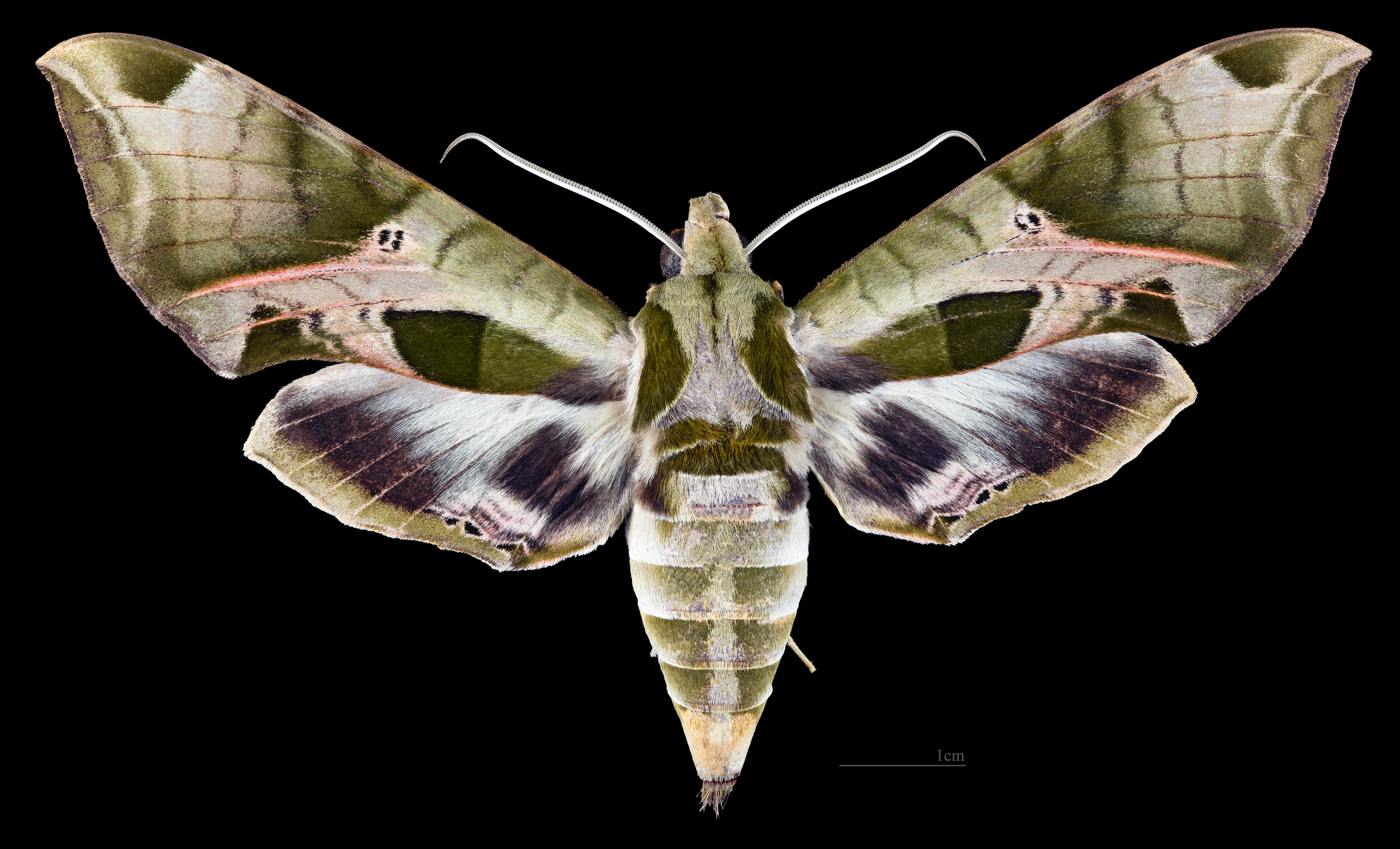
Female dorsal

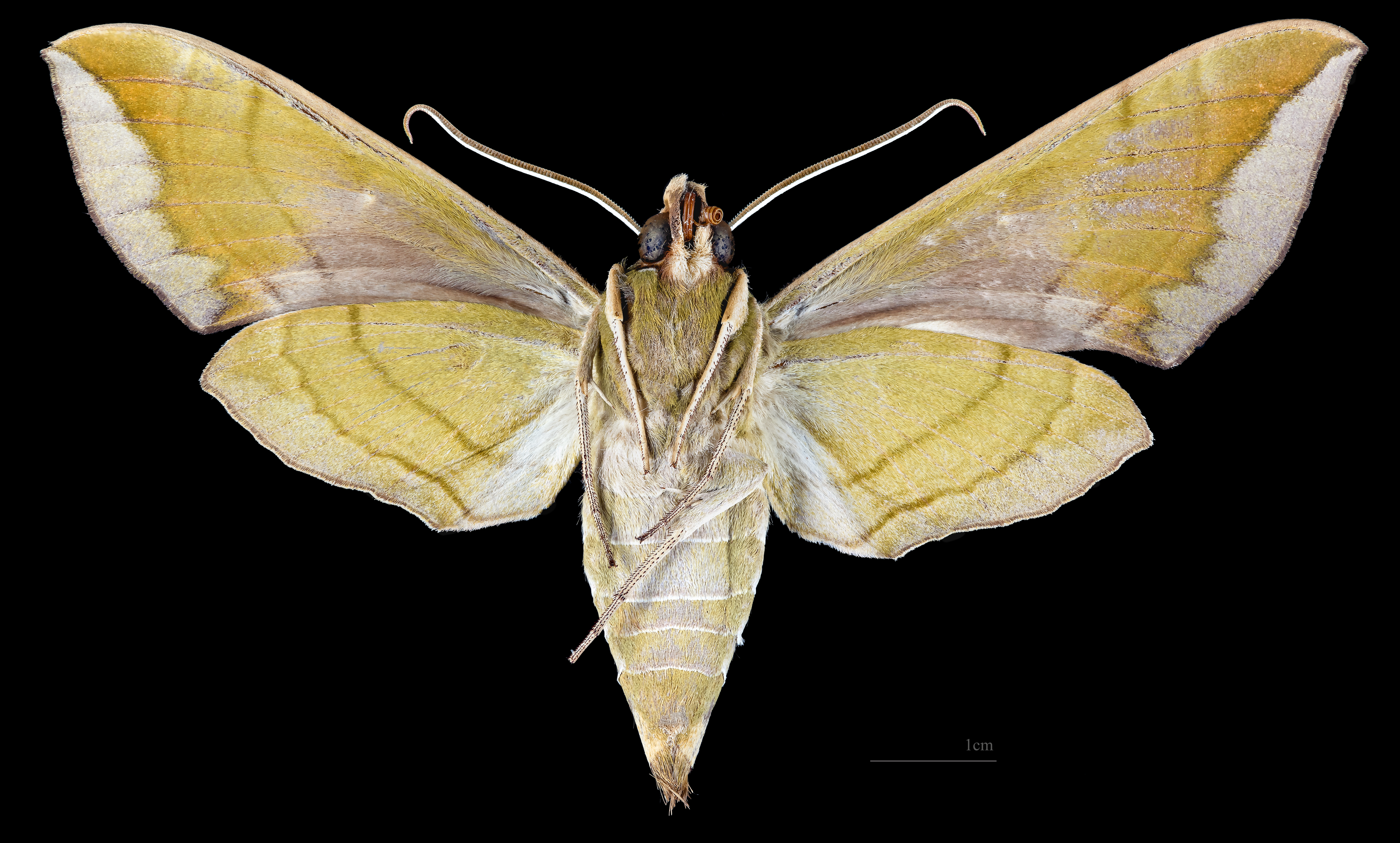
Female ventral

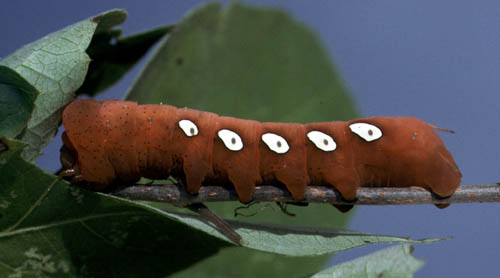
Caterpillar

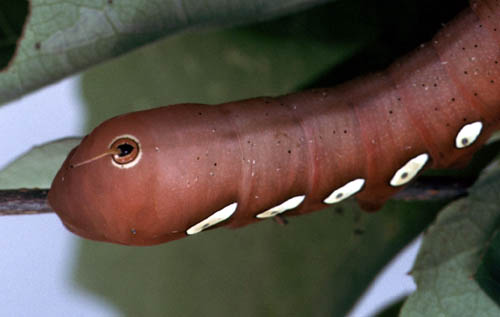
In Durham

== Distribution ==
The species is widespread in the east, the southeast and the center of North America, from Nova Scotia and Ontario to Florida and eastern Texas. American Southwest.

== Biology ==
Adult moths fly at dusk. Like other Sphingidae, adult pandora sphinx moths have a long proboscis that is used to feed on nectar. Females lay translucent eggs singly on leaves of the host plant, mainly Vitis spp. (grapes), Ampelopsis spp. (peppervine) and Parthenocissus quinquefolia (Virginia creeper). The pandora sphinx moth produces two broods during the summer months in the portion of its range around New York City, while it may be univoltine in the northern parts of its range. Larvae consume copious amounts of foliage, and when they are ready, after achieving the fifth larval instar, they climb down their host plant and burrow underground, where they pupate. The pupa is dark brown in color, quite slender, and has a long cremaster. There the pupa will remain for either a couple of weeks if there are multiple broods per year, or for the duration of winter, either in the last brood of the year or in univoltine populations. When the pupa is ready, it wiggles to the surface just prior to eclosion. The newly emerged adults then climb on a plant or some other surface and pump fluid (haemolymph) into their wings to extend them. Females emit pheromones at night, and males fly into the wind to track a female's pheromone plume after casting about at right angles to the wind to locate a plume.
