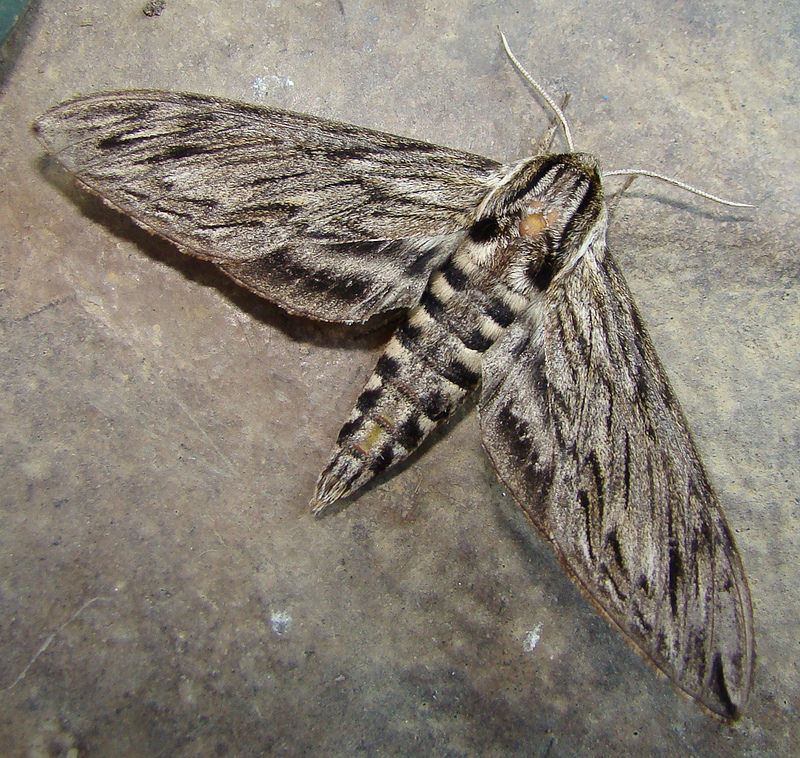

Scientific classification
- Domain: Eukaryota
- Kingdom: Animalia
- Phylum: Arthropoda
- Class: Insecta
- Order: Lepidoptera
- Family: Sphingidae
- Genus: Sphinx
- Species: S. canadensis

Binomial name
- Sphinx canadensis (Boisduval, 1875)

Synonyms
- Sphinx plota Strecker, 1875

= Sphinx canadensis =

Canadian sphinx

Species of moth

Sphinx canadensis, the Canadian sphinx, is a member of the family Sphingidae. The species was first described by Jean Baptiste Boisduval in 1875.

== Distribution ==
That is found the northeastern United States and as north as Newfoundland and Labrador, Canada.

== Description ==
The adult's wingspan is between 70 and 85 mm. It is often confused with the hermit sphinx (Sphinx eremitus) throughout their overlaying areas, but unlike S. eremitus it has no white spot. The forewing of this species is gray brown with black streaks along the veins, interrupted by white lines along the outer margin. The hindwing is patterned with black and white bands.

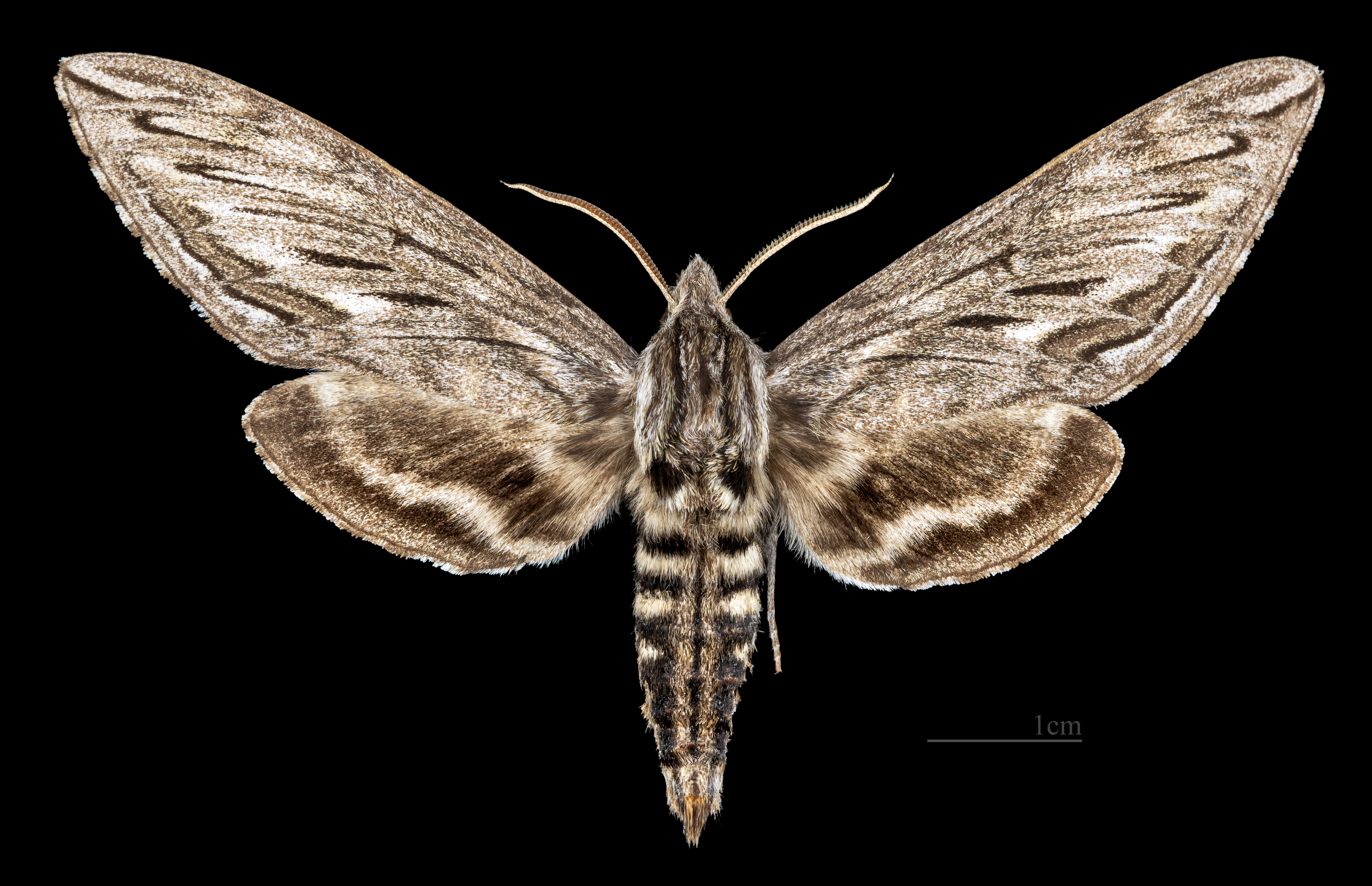
Sphinx canadensis ♂

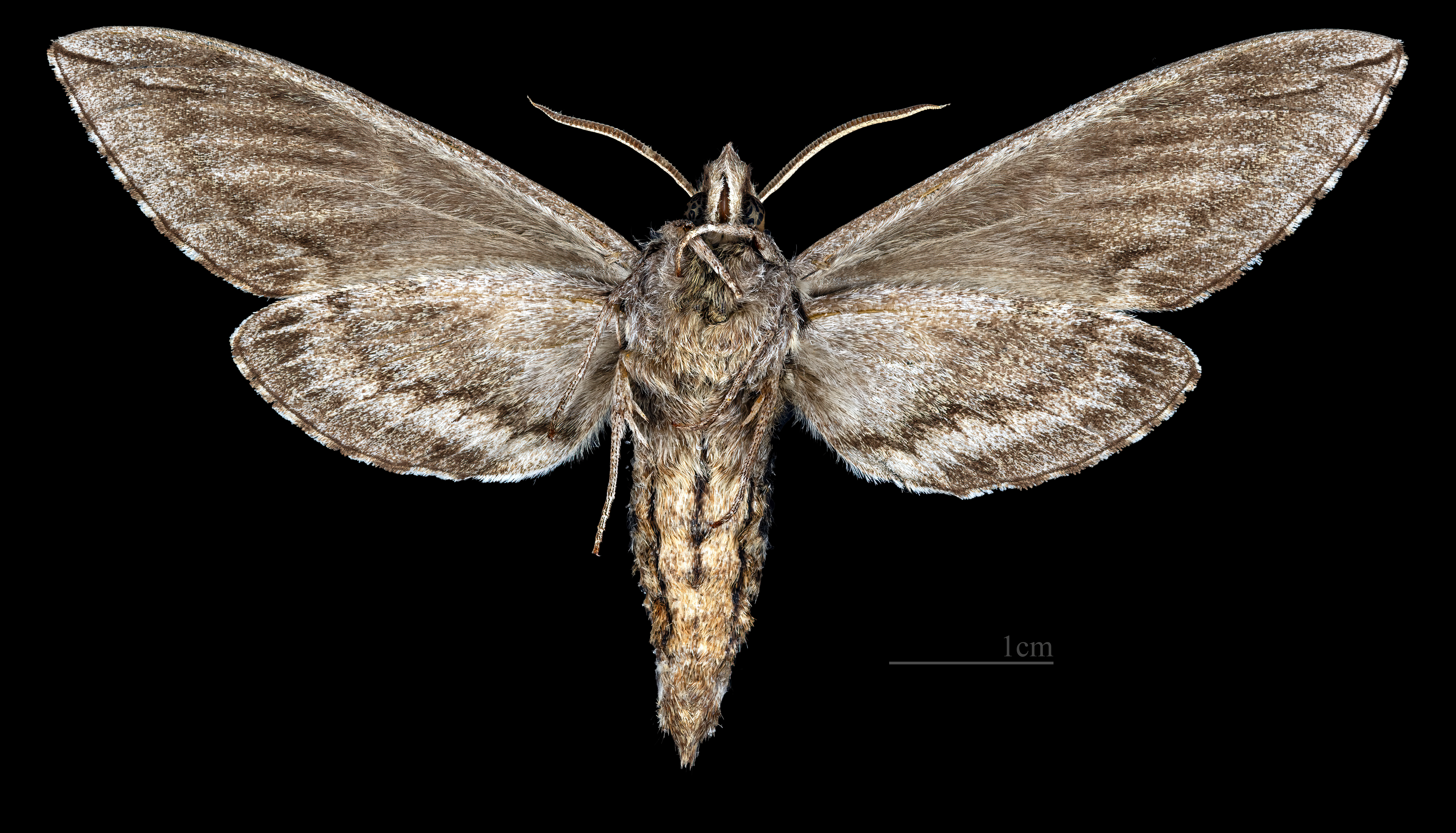
Sphinx canadensis ♂ △

== Biology ==
It was previously thought that the larvae of this species fed on both white ash (Fraxinus americana) and blueberry (Vaccinium), but recent observations suggest that the only larval host plant is black ash (Fraxinus nigra) which grows at the edges of swamps. Phlox (Phlox species) and bouncing bet (Saponaria officinalis) are the preferred nectar sources. Adults fly much later in the year than other sphinx moth species; most adults are collected in very late July or early August. The black patches on the sides of the larvae are thought to mimic the curled leaves of black ash.
