= Sphingicampa bisecta =

Scientific classification
- Kingdom: Animalia
- Phylum: Arthropoda
- Class: Insecta
- Order: Lepidoptera
- Family: Saturniidae
- Genus: Syssphinx
- Species: S. bisecta

Binomial name
- Syssphinx bisecta (Lintner, 1879)

Species of moth

Sphingicampa bisecta, the bisected honey locust moth, is a species of moth in the family Saturniidae (giant silkworm and royal moths). The species was described by Joseph Albert Lintner in 1879. It is found in North America.

The MONA or Hodges number for Sphingicampa bisecta is 7712.
