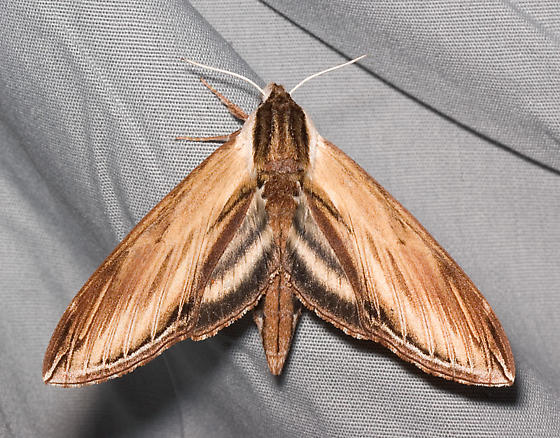

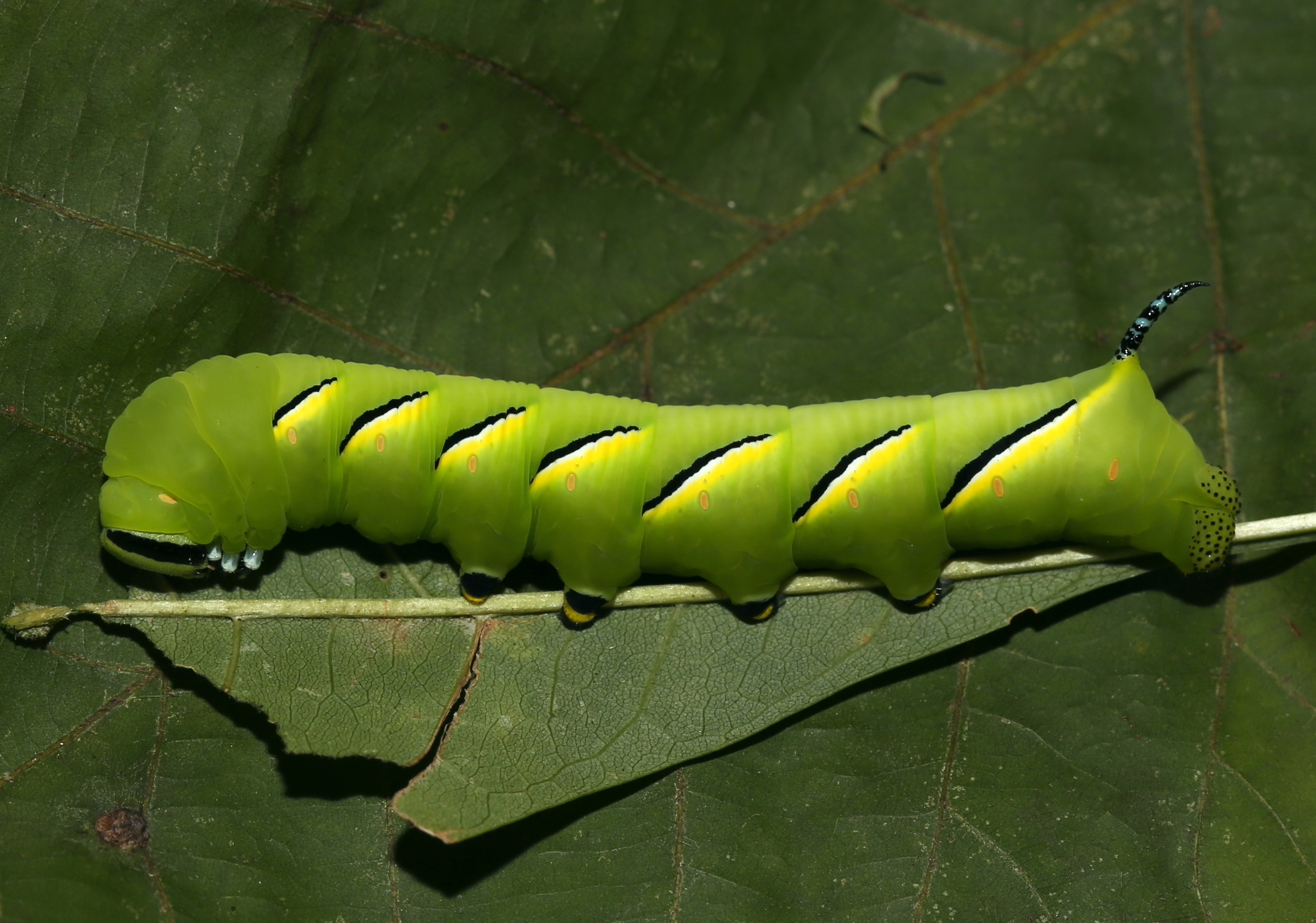
- Larva feeding on ash

Scientific classification
- Kingdom: Animalia
- Phylum: Arthropoda
- Class: Insecta
- Order: Lepidoptera
- Family: Sphingidae
- Genus: Sphinx
- Species: S. kalmiae

Binomial name
- Sphinx kalmiae J. E. Smith, 1797

= Sphinx kalmiae =

Species of moth

Sphinx kalmiae, the laurel sphinx, is a moth of the family Sphingidae.

== Distribution ==
It is found in the temperate regions of the United States and southern Canada, east of the Great Plains, and in the northern part of its range it also occurs west of the Rocky Mountains.

== Description ==
The wingspan is 75–103 mm.

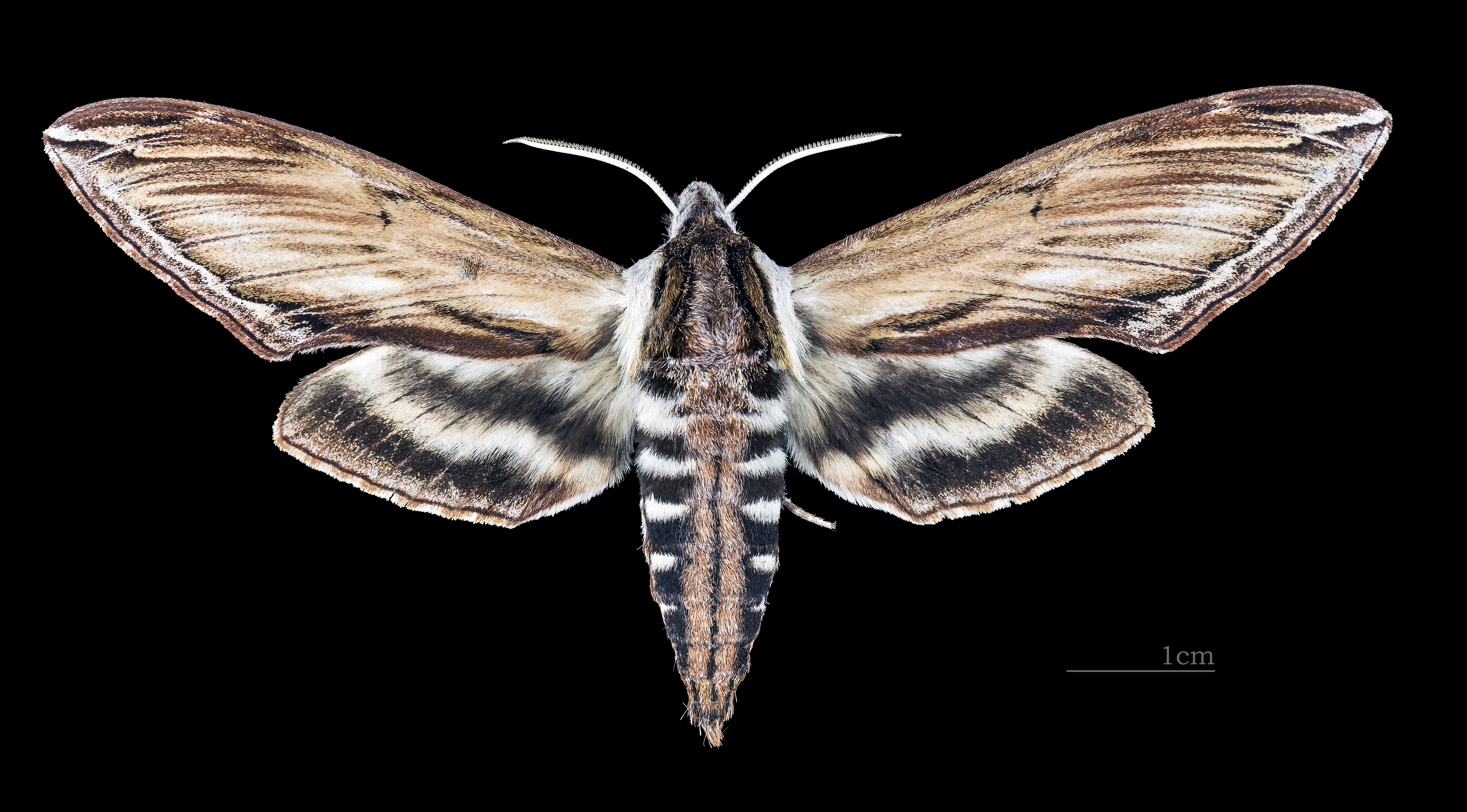
Male dorsal

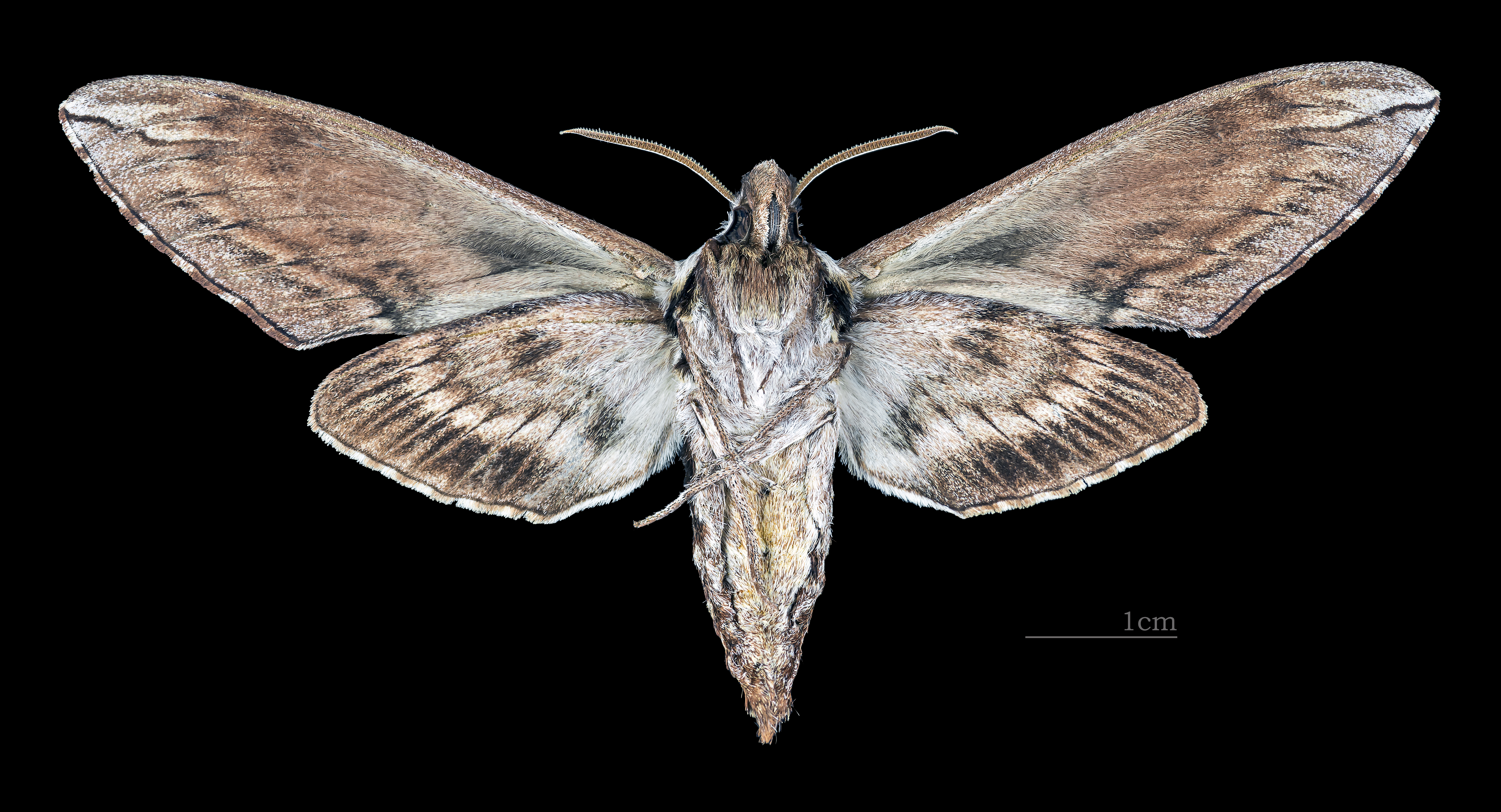
Male ventral

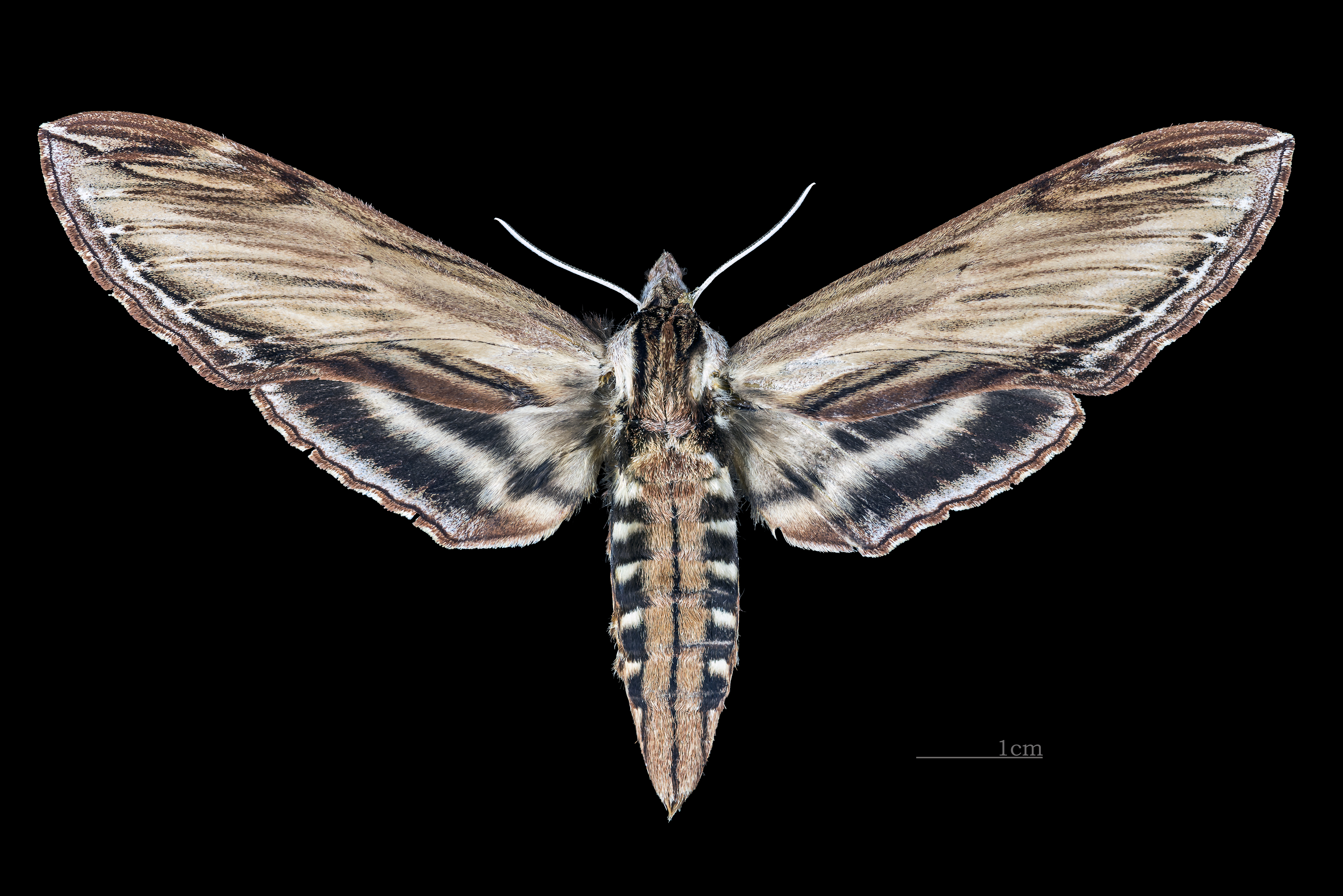
Female dorsal

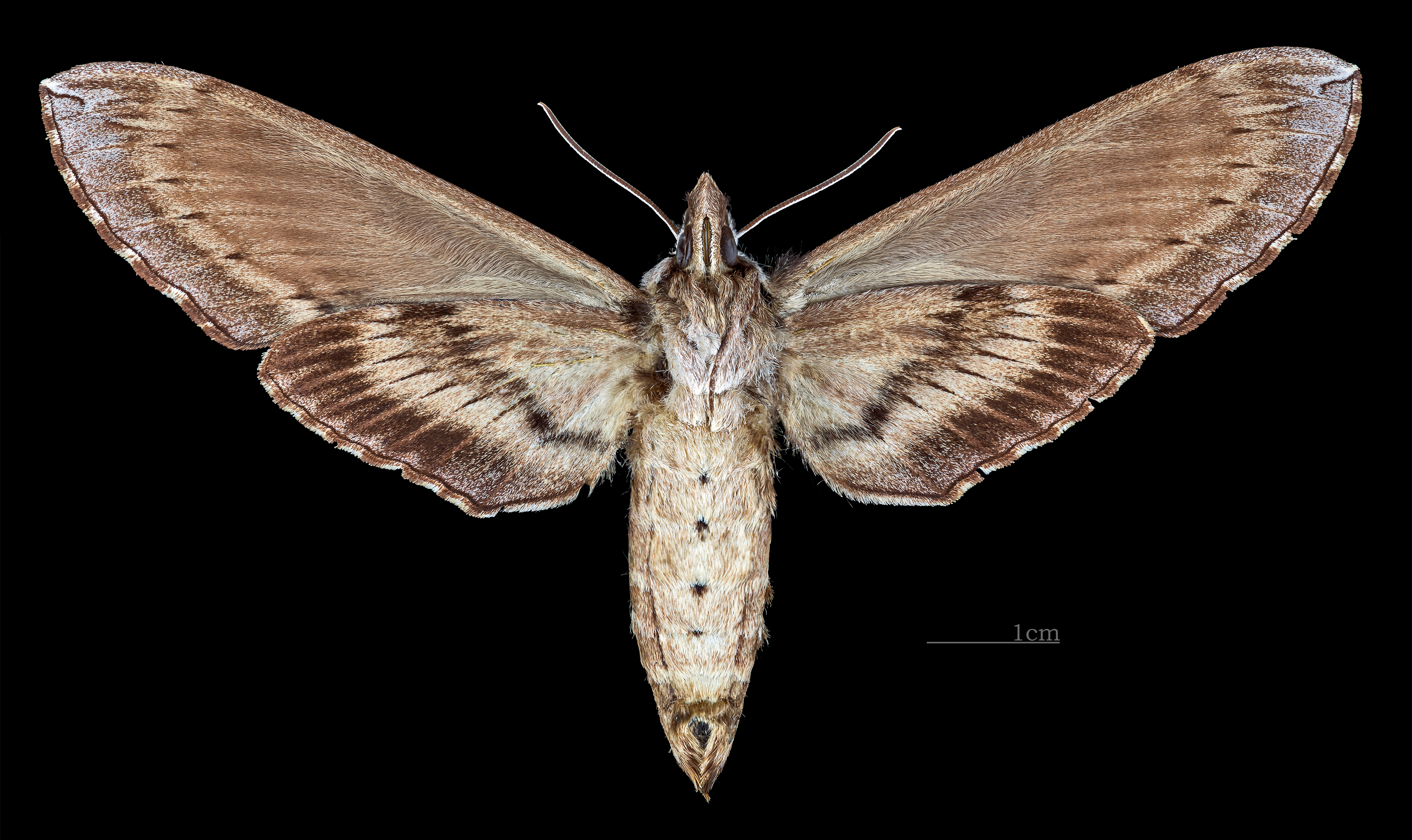
Female ventral

== Biology ==
In Canada, there is one generation per year with adults on wing in June and July. More to the south, there are two generations per year with adults on wing from late May to June and again from July to August. There may be as many as six generations in Louisiana.

The larvae feed on Chionanthus, Kalmia, Syringa and Fraxinus species.

== Taxonomy ==
English entomologist James Edward Smith named this moth after Kalmia, the plant on which its caterpillar was first observed.
