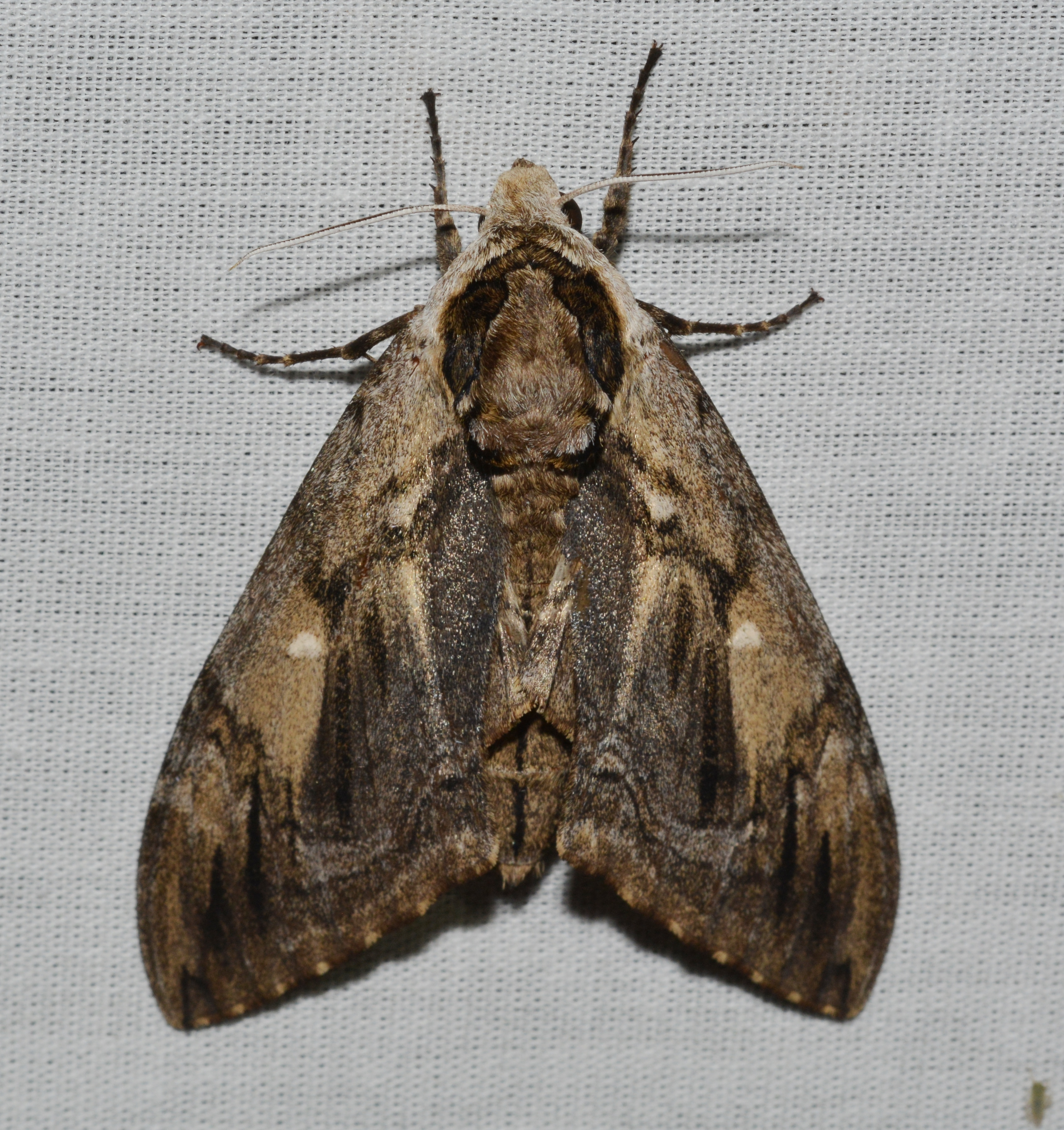

Scientific classification
- Kingdom: Animalia
- Phylum: Arthropoda
- Clade: Pancrustacea
- Class: Insecta
- Order: Lepidoptera
- Family: Sphingidae
- Genus: Ceratomia
- Species: C. amyntor

Binomial name
- Ceratomia amyntor (Geyer, 1835)

Synonyms
- Agrius amyntor Geyer, 1835; Ceratomia quadricornis Harris, 1839; Ceratomia ulmi Boisduval, 1875

= Ceratomia amyntor =

Elm sphinx

Species of moth

Ceratomia amyntor, the elm sphinx or four-horned sphinx, is a North American moth in the family Sphingidae. The species was first described by Carl Geyer in 1835. It has a wingspan of 3 1/4-4 1/2 inches (8.2 - 11.5 cm). As the name suggests, the larvae (caterpillars) feed on elm trees (Ulmus), but they can also be found feeding on birch (Betula), basswood (Tilia), and cherry (Prunus). When the caterpillars are ready, they crawl to the bottom of the host tree, where they crawl underneath the soil and pupate and may overwinter underground if late enough into the year.

== Range ==
C. amyntor can be found from Nova Scotia west to Alberta and western North Dakota and Colorado; south Florida reaching into the Gulf Coast, Georgia, Texas, Louisiana and New Mexico.

== Status ==
The species is not threatened.

== Life cycle ==
C. amyntor adults fly as a single brood in the northern portions of their range from June to July. There are two broods further south, flying later into the year, and five broods have been confirmed in Louisiana from March to October.

=== Egg ===
Tiny, translucent, lime-green eggs deposited on the underside of host leaves. The shells are transparent and pearly after hatching.

=== Larva ===
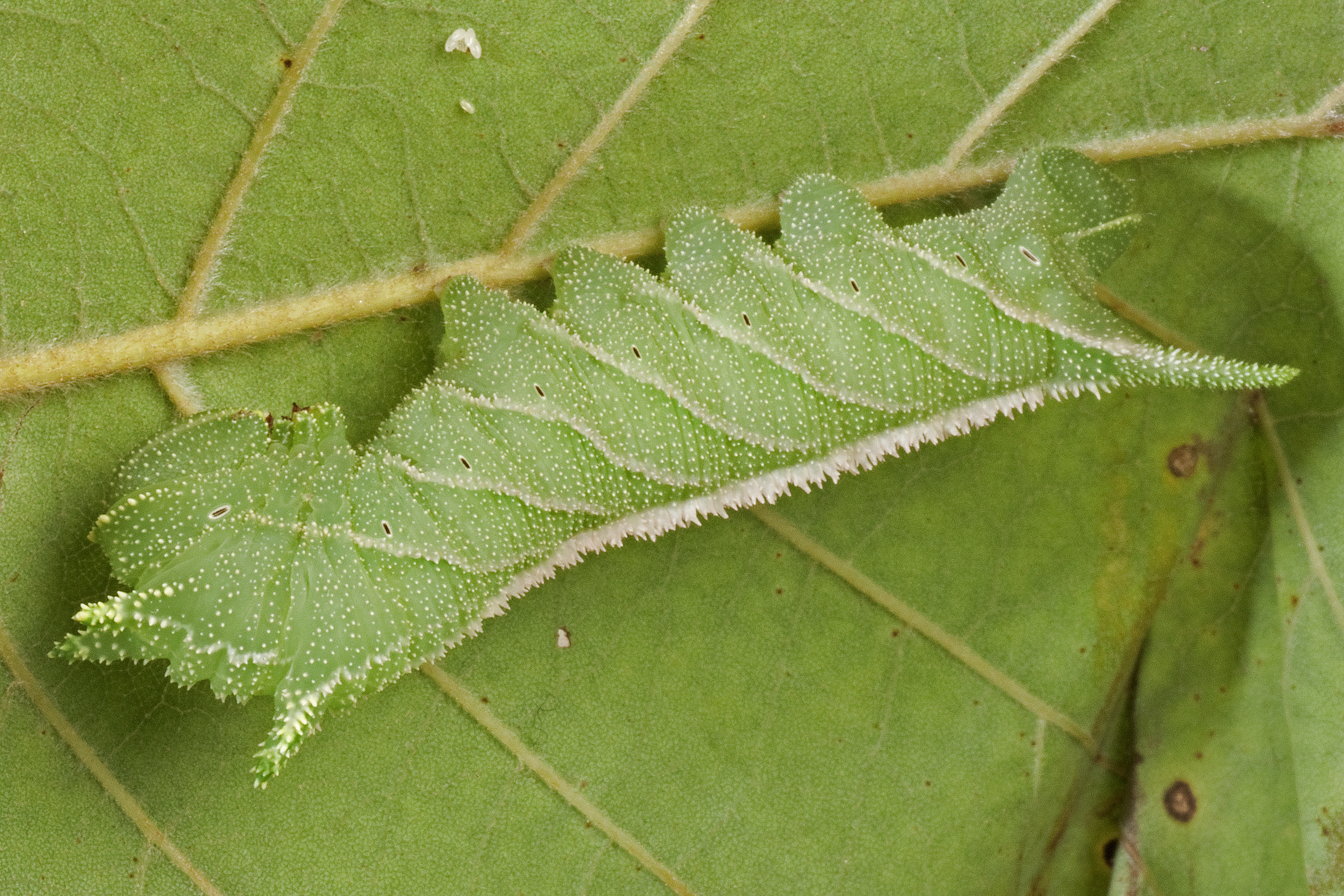
Larva

Larvae come in two different color phases; a green phase, and a dark phase which differs in shades of brown, orange, and somewhat of a pinkish brown. Larvae complete all five instars within approximately one month. The first instar is the same shade of green as its egg. As the larva progresses through its instars, change in structure is noticeable. The caterpillar sports four, long, horn-like projections - in addition to the tail horn - from above its head, which is why the elm sphinx is sometimes called the four-horned sphinx.

=== Pupa ===
As with other Sphingidae, C. amyntor goes through a "wandering" phase where it stops feeding and burrows into the soil in order to pupate. Before pupating, the larva shrinks a considerable amount and then sheds its remaining skin that distinguishes it as a caterpillar, revealing its shell-like pupa.

=== Imago ===
The overall coloring of the imago, or adult, elm sphinx is a gray-brown with wavy markings covering the forewings. In the upper center of the forewings, as with other Ceratomia species, there is a small white dot. The hindwings are a plain gray with a darker band running the length of the near-edge. The outer ends of the forewings and hindwings are both dashed with a light-dark-light pattern. Three broken, dark bands run the length of the body from the thorax to the tip of the abdomen. The antennae are stiff and wiry and have hook at the tips. Some specimens have a prominent splash of bright white on their upper head and wings and stand out considerably from other C. amyntor.

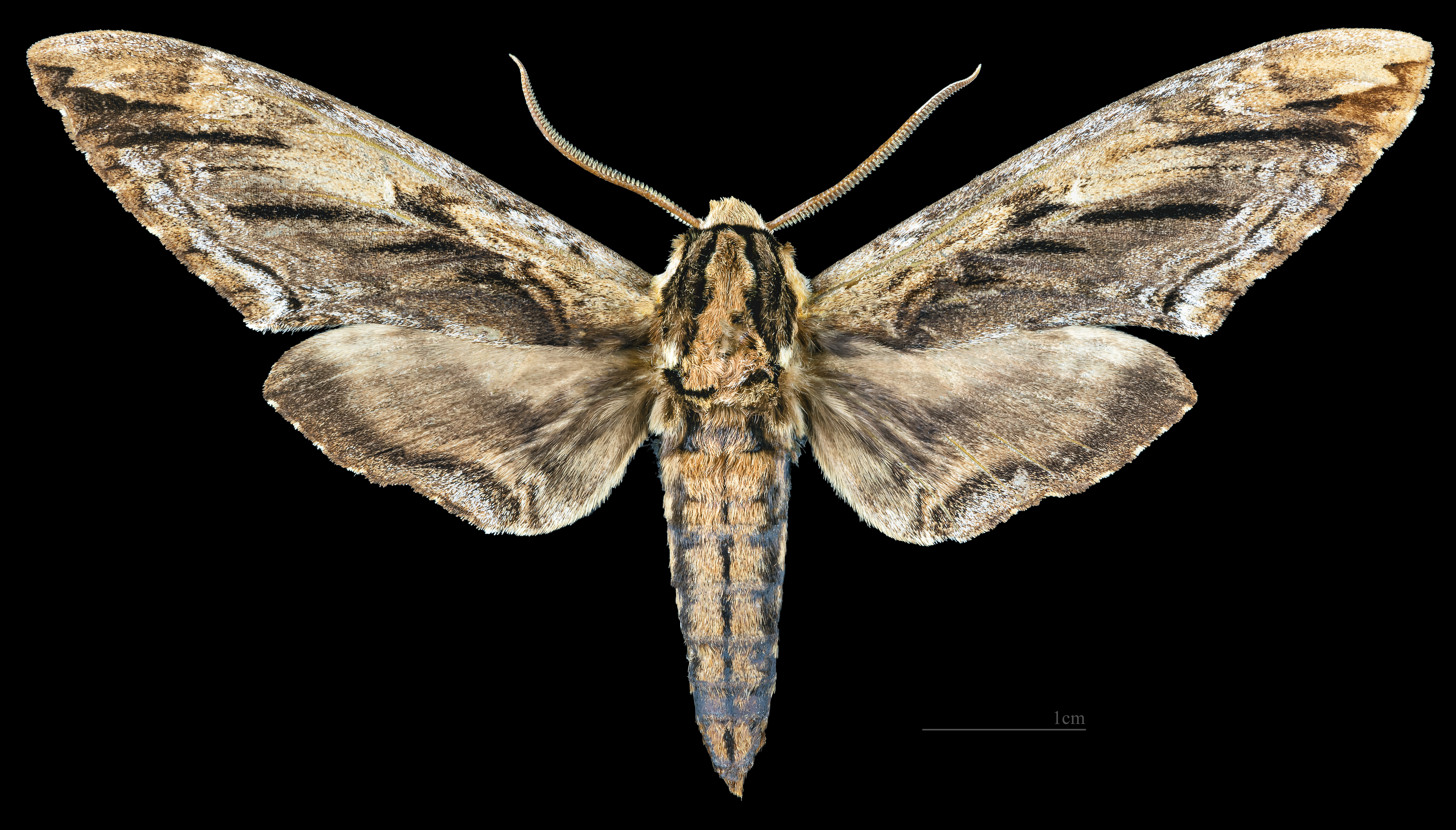
Ceratomia amyntor ♂

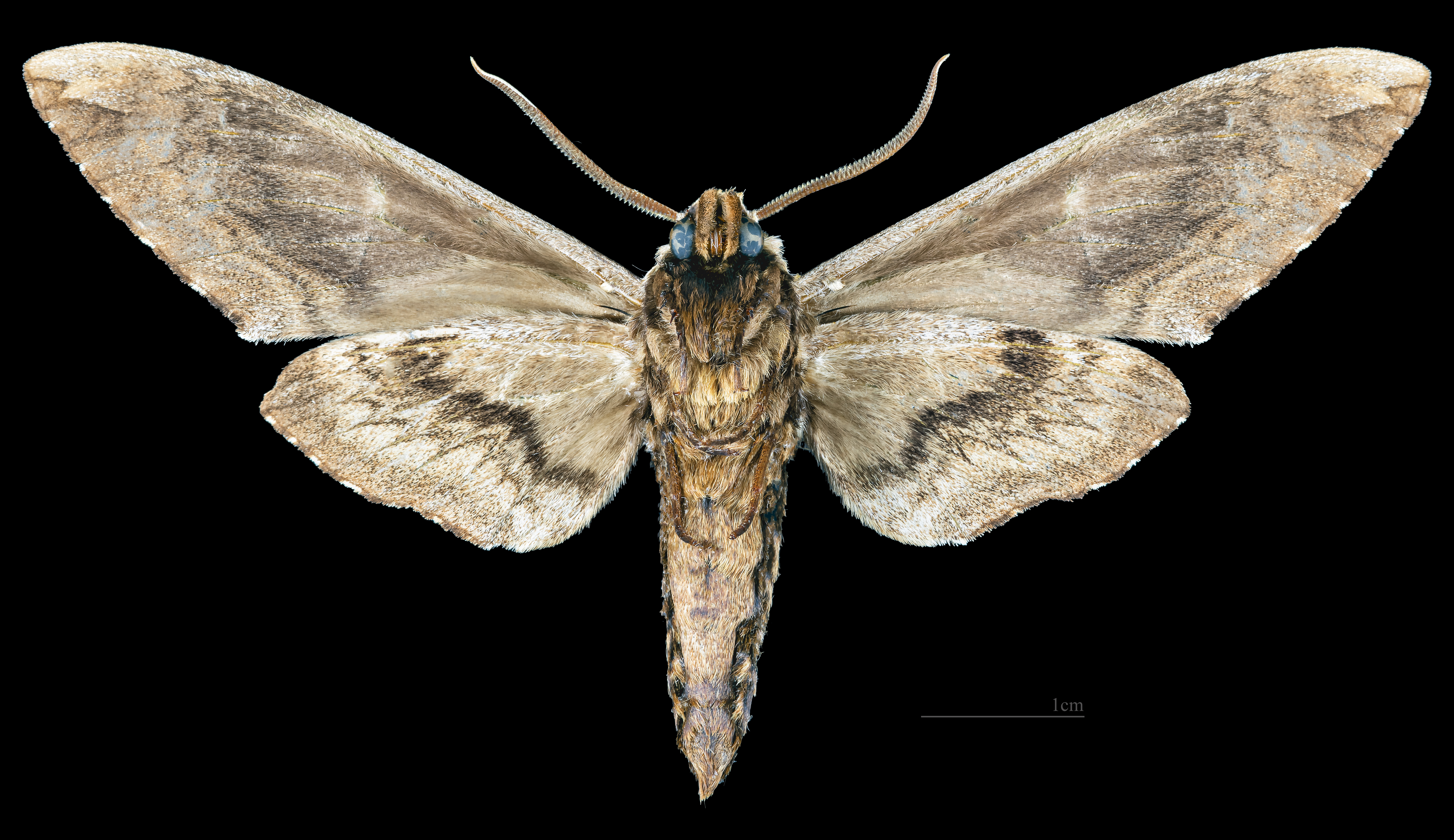
Ceratomia amyntor ♂ △

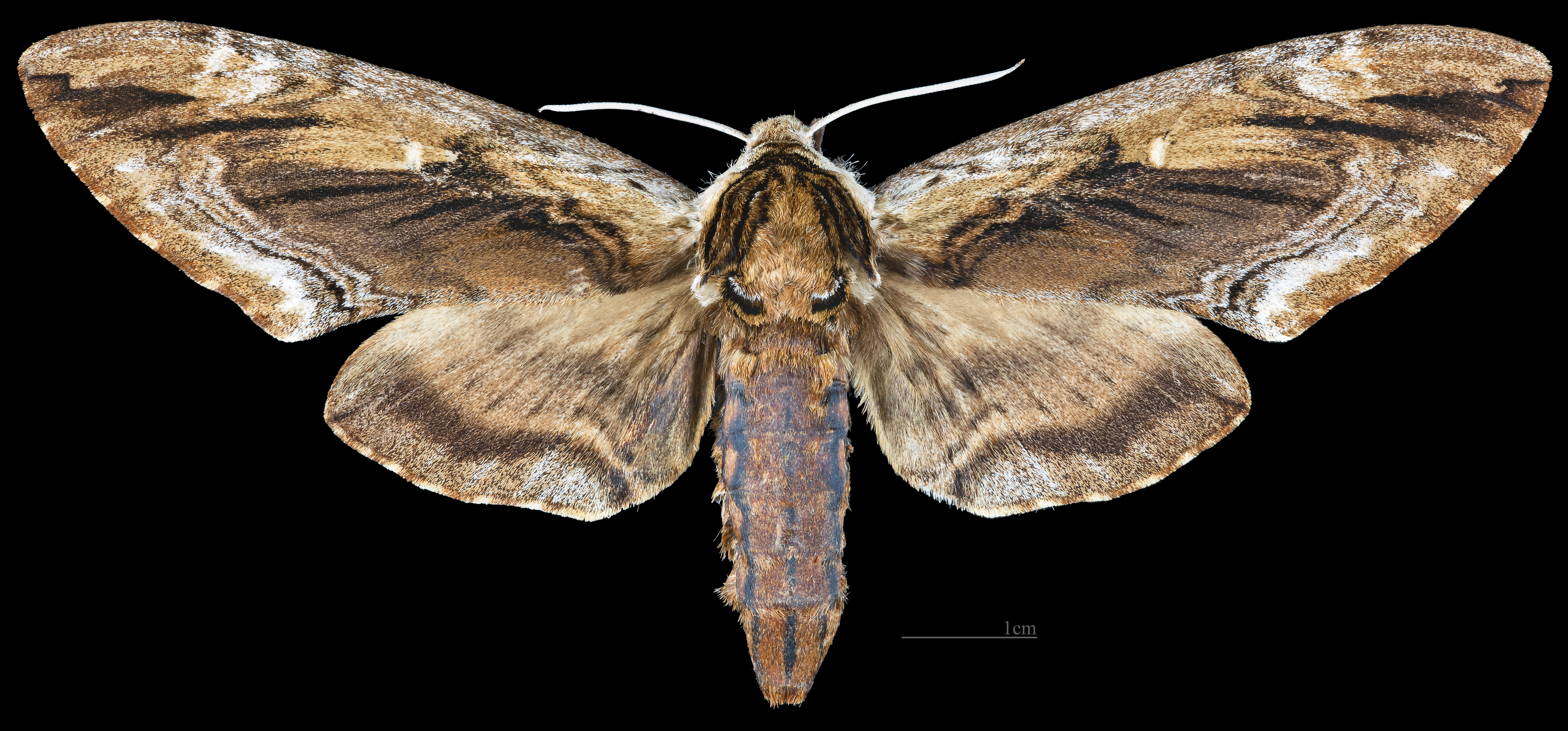
Ceratomia amyntor ♀

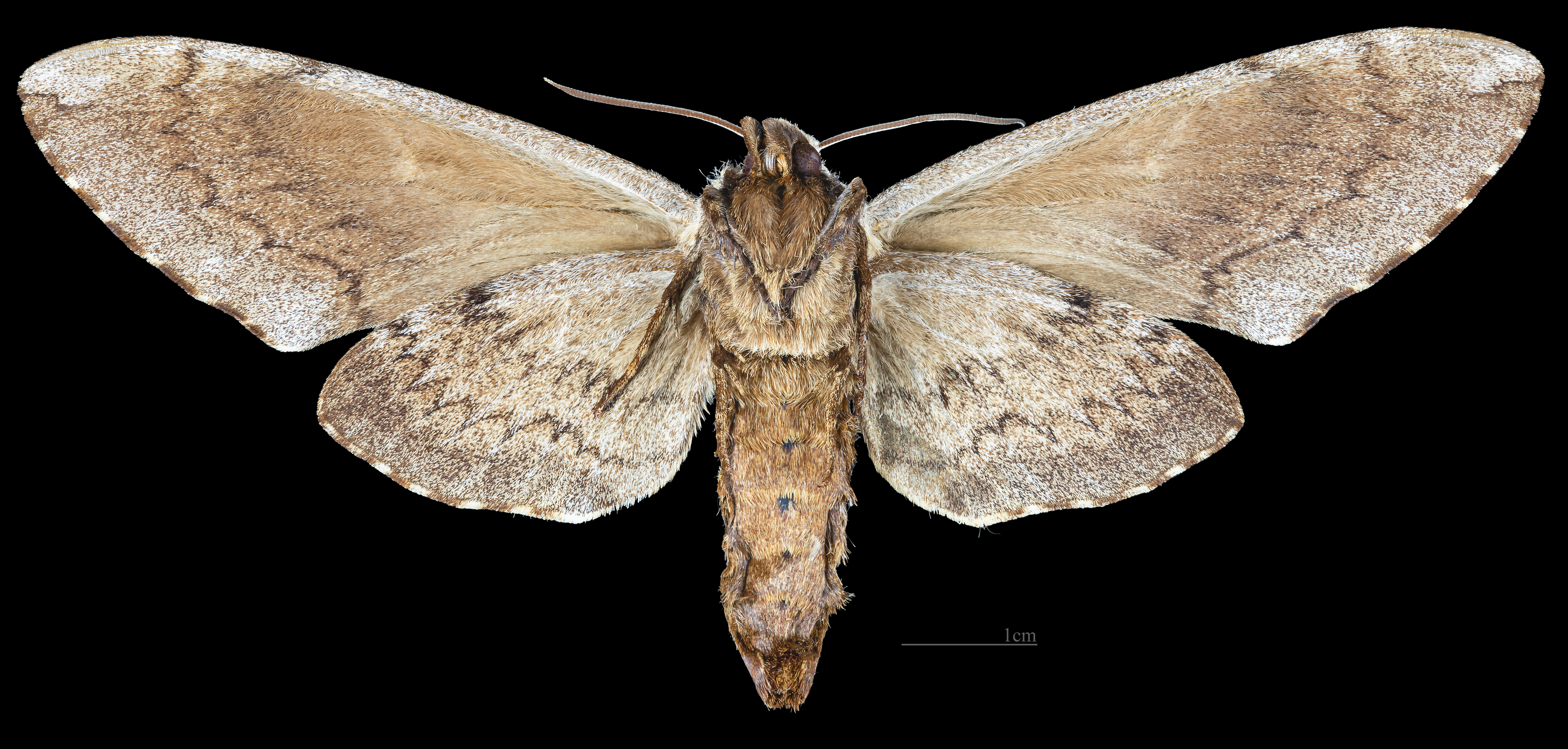
Ceratomia amyntor ♀ △

== Food plants ==
- Ulmus (elm)
- Betula (birch)
- Tilia (basswood)
- Prunus (cherry)

== See also ==
- Lepidoptera
- Moths
- Sphingidae
