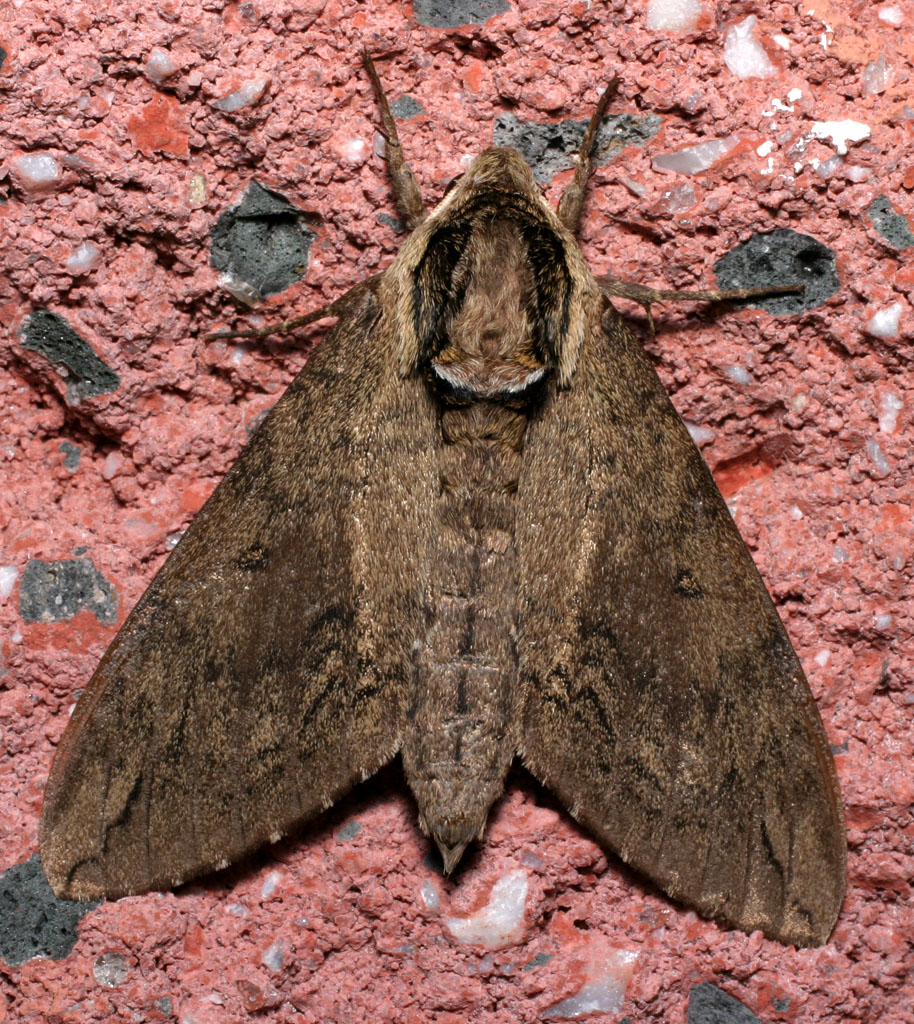
- Catalpa sphinx Ceratomia catalpae

Scientific classification
- Domain: Eukaryota
- Kingdom: Animalia
- Phylum: Arthropoda
- Class: Insecta
- Order: Lepidoptera
- Family: Sphingidae
- Tribe: Sphingini
- Genus: Ceratomia; Harris, 1839

Species
- Several, see text

Synonyms
- Autogramma Jordan, 1946; Daremma Walker, 1856; Isogramma Rothschild & Jordan, 1903

= Ceratomia =

Genus of moths

Ceratomia is a genus of hawkmoths (family Sphingidae). The genus was erected by Thaddeus William Harris in 1839. Species include:

== Species ==
- Ceratomia amyntor (Geyer 1835)
- Ceratomia catalpae (Boisduval 1875)
- Ceratomia hageni Grote 1874
- Ceratomia hoffmanni Mooser 1942
- Ceratomia igualana Schaus, 1932
- Ceratomia sonorensis Hodges 1971
- Ceratomia undulosa (Walker 1856)
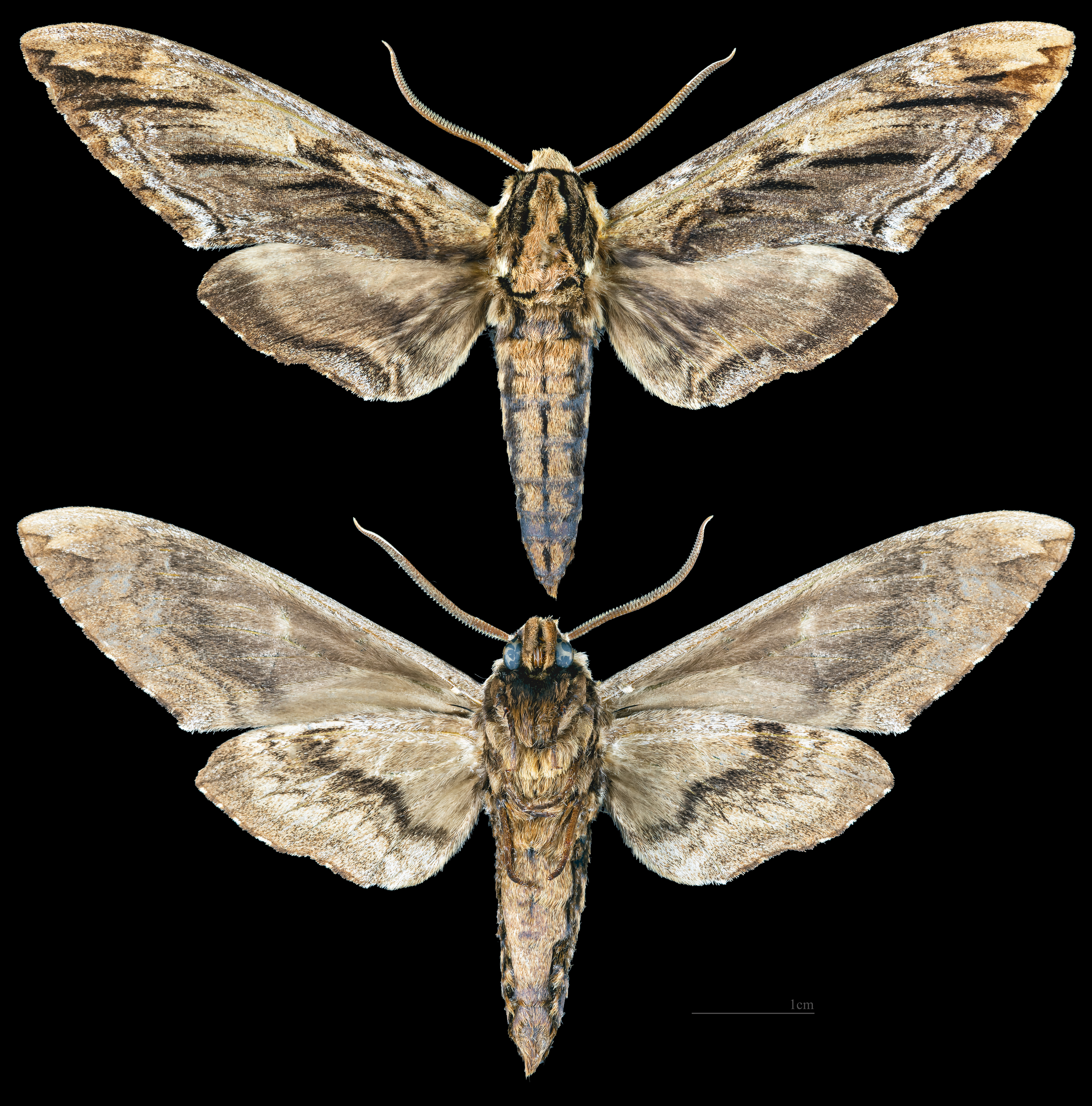
Ceratomia amyntor

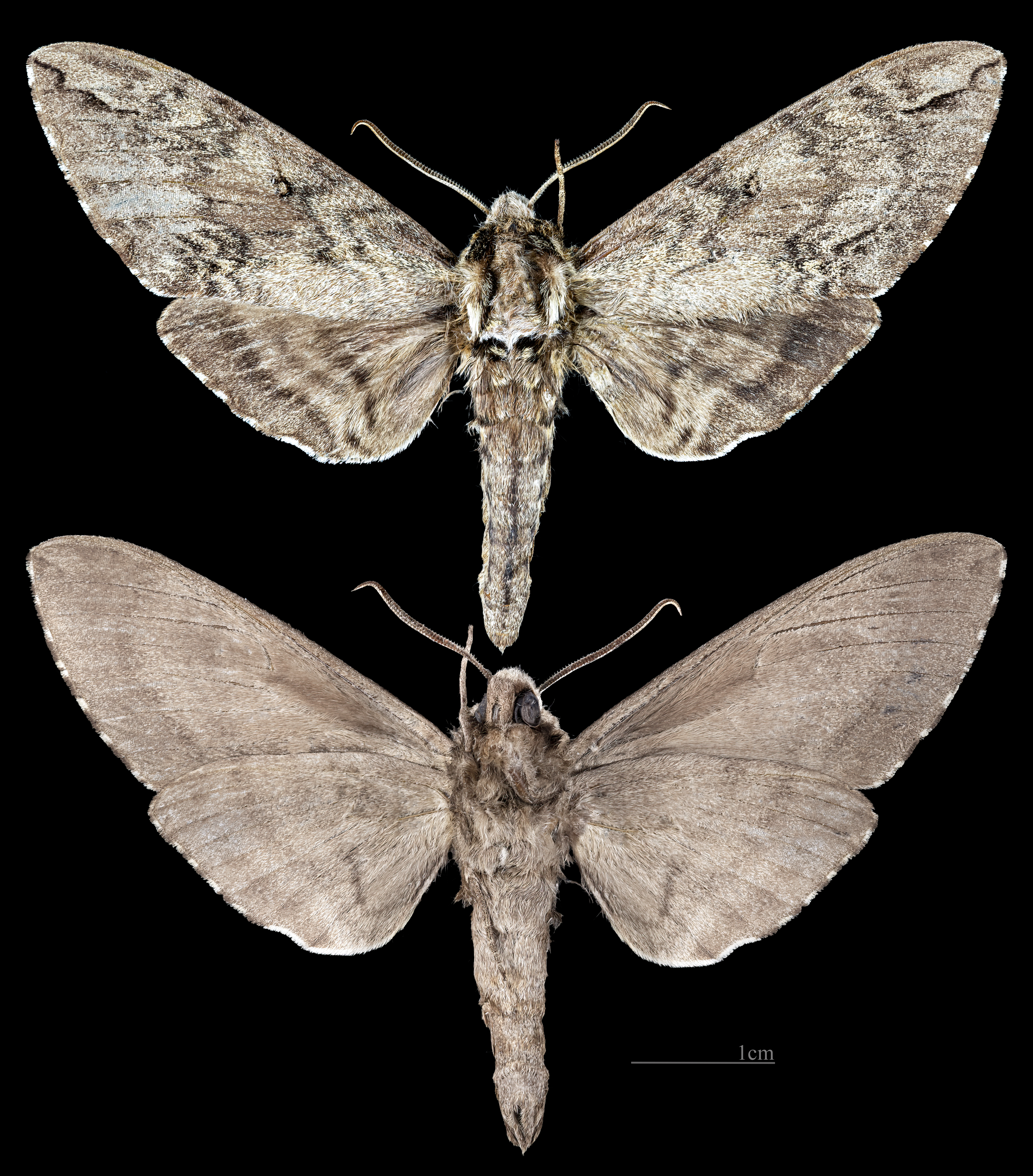
Ceratomia catalpae

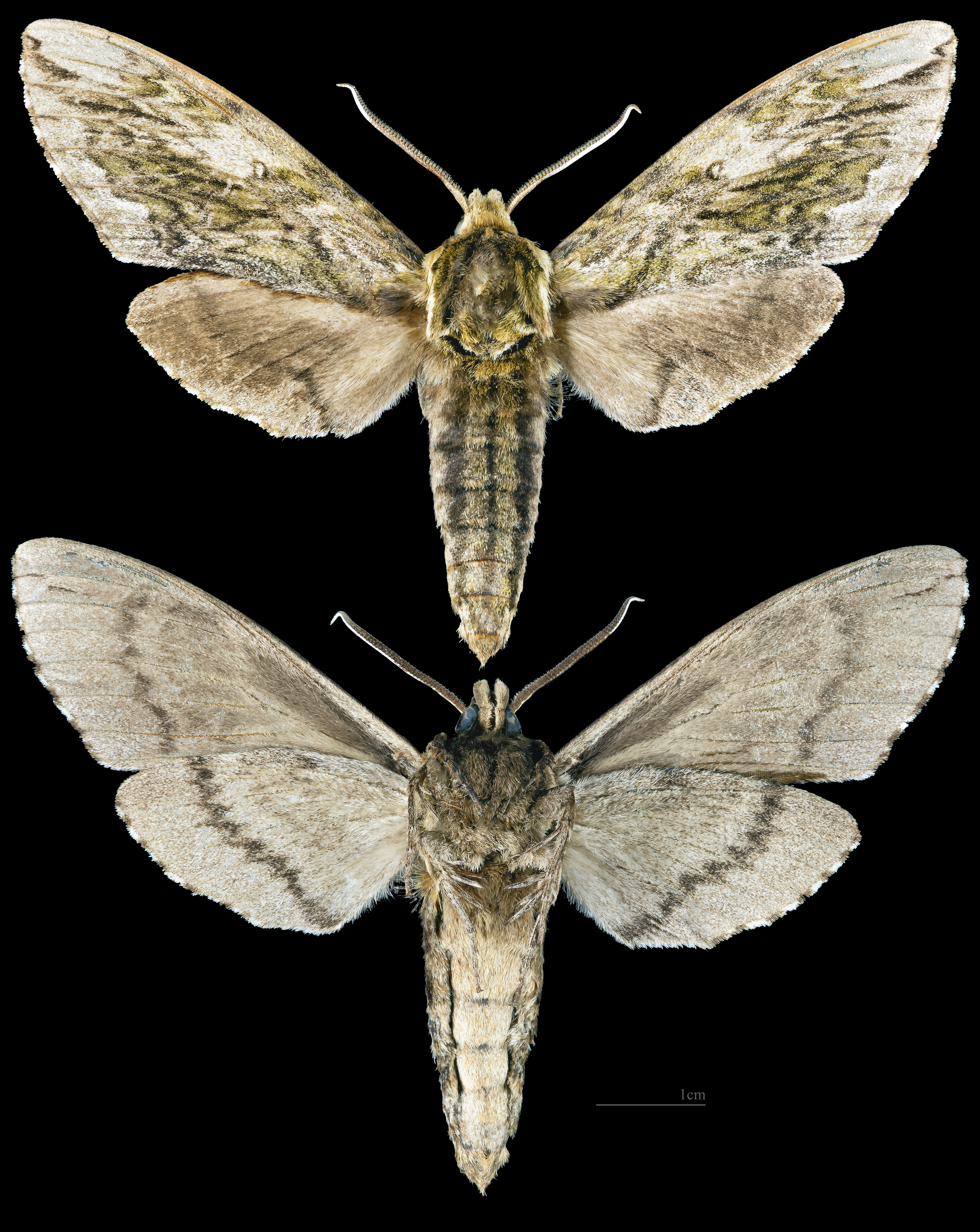
Ceratomia hageni

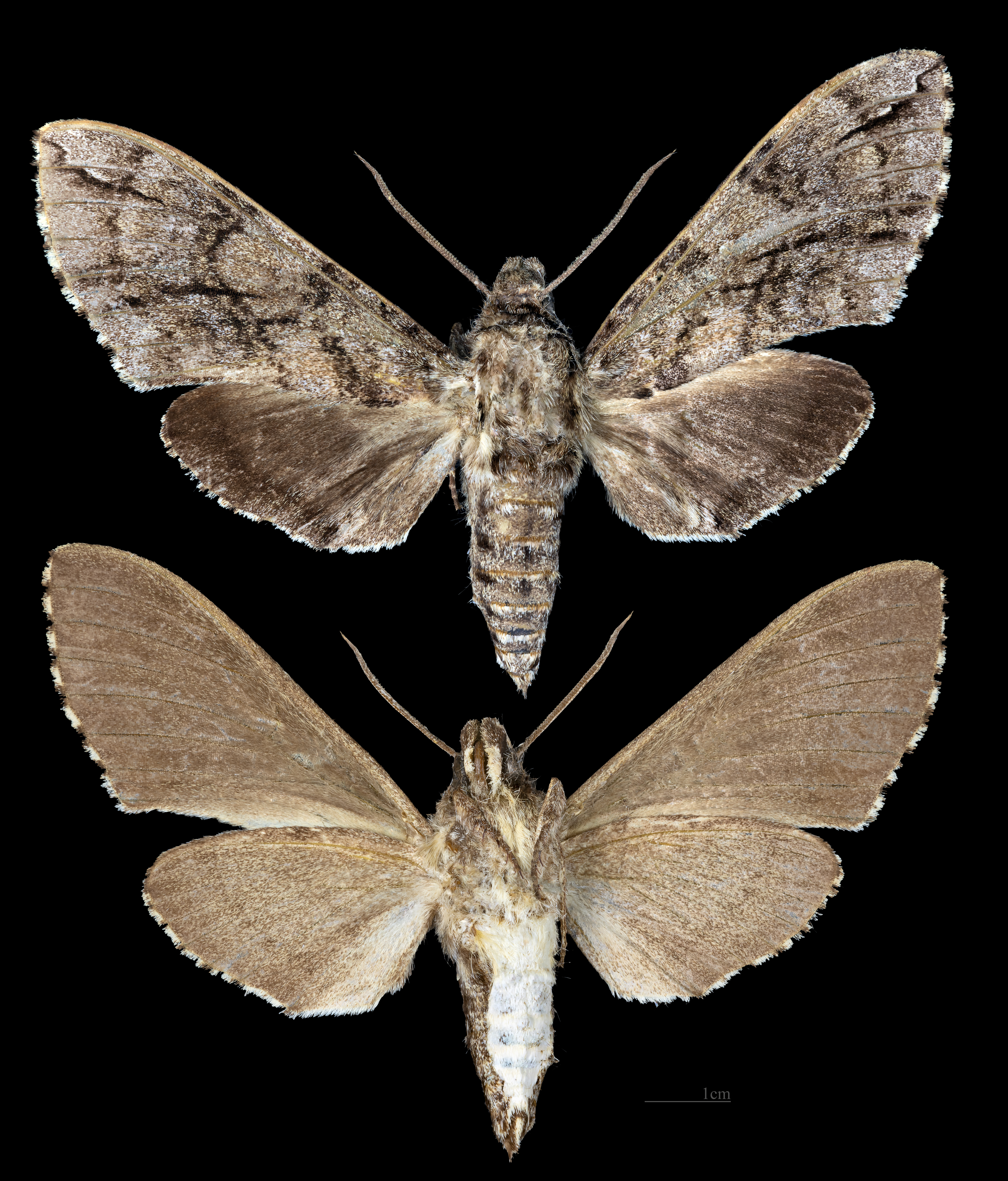
Ceratomia igualana

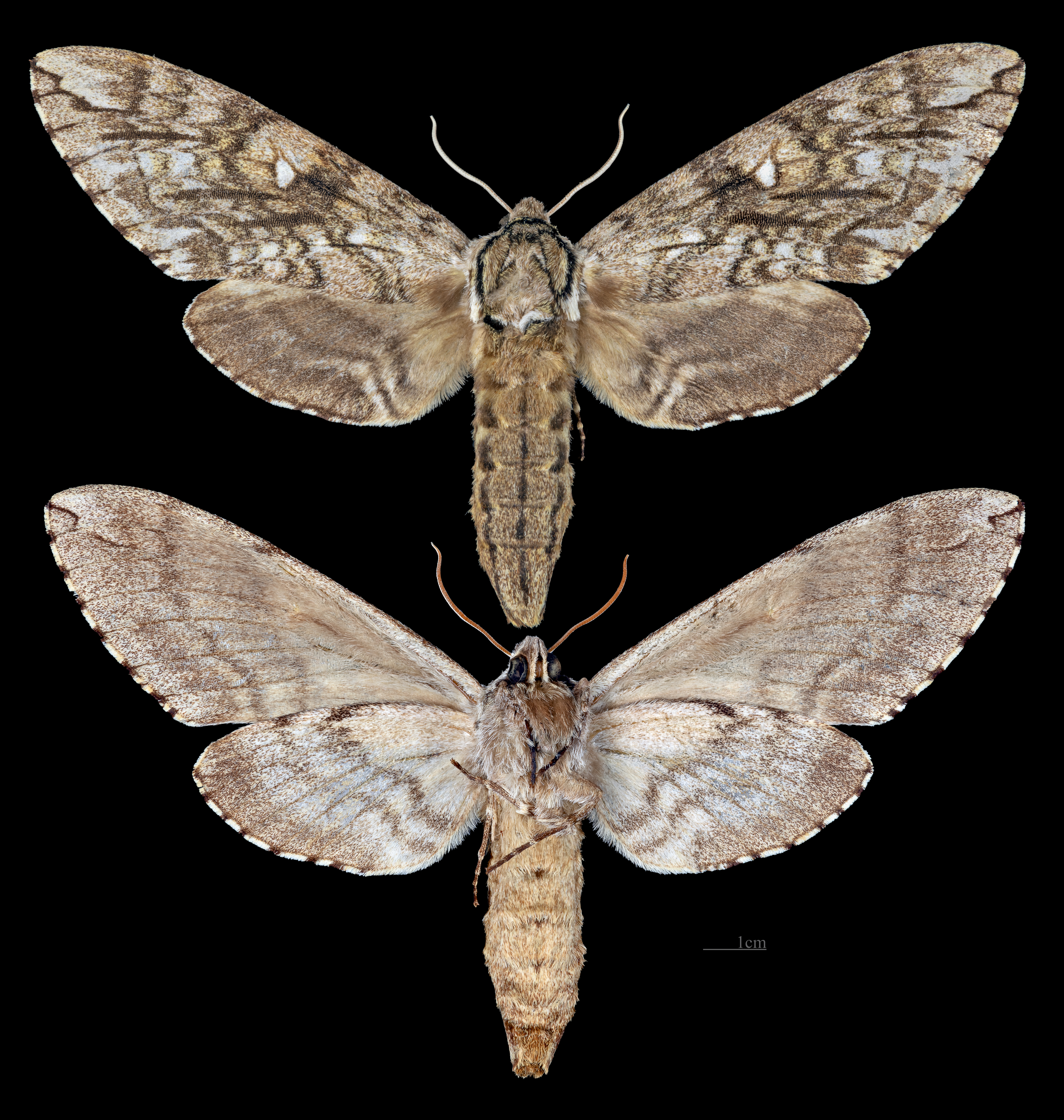
Ceratomia undulosa

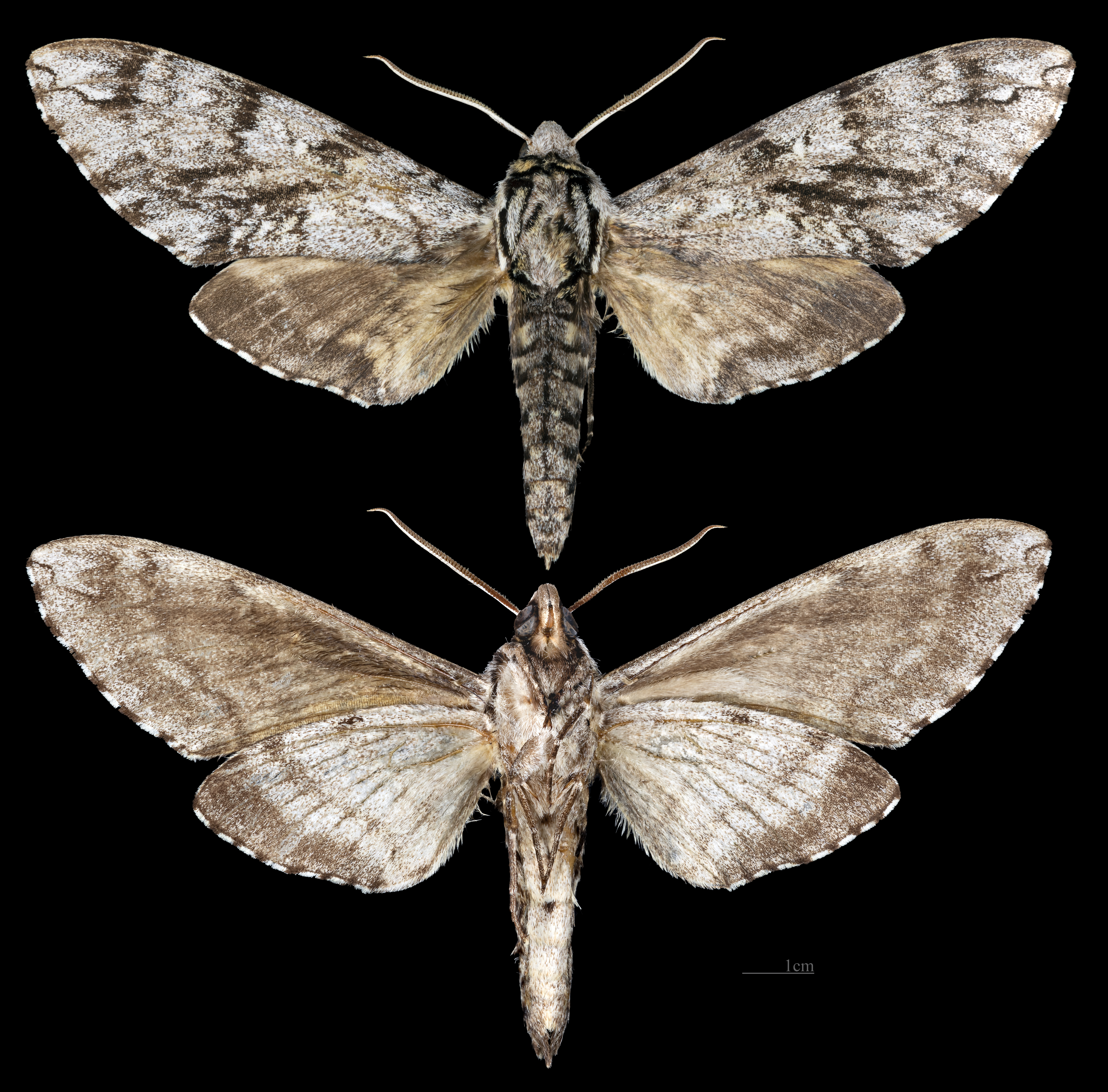
Ceratomia sonorensis
