= Ceratomia hoffmanni =

Scientific classification
- Domain: Eukaryota
- Kingdom: Animalia
- Phylum: Arthropoda
- Class: Insecta
- Order: Lepidoptera
- Family: Sphingidae
- Genus: Ceratomia
- Species: C. hoffmanni

Binomial name
- Ceratomia hoffmanni Mooser, 1942

Species of moth

Ceratomia hoffmanni is a moth of the family Sphingidae. It is known from Mexico.
