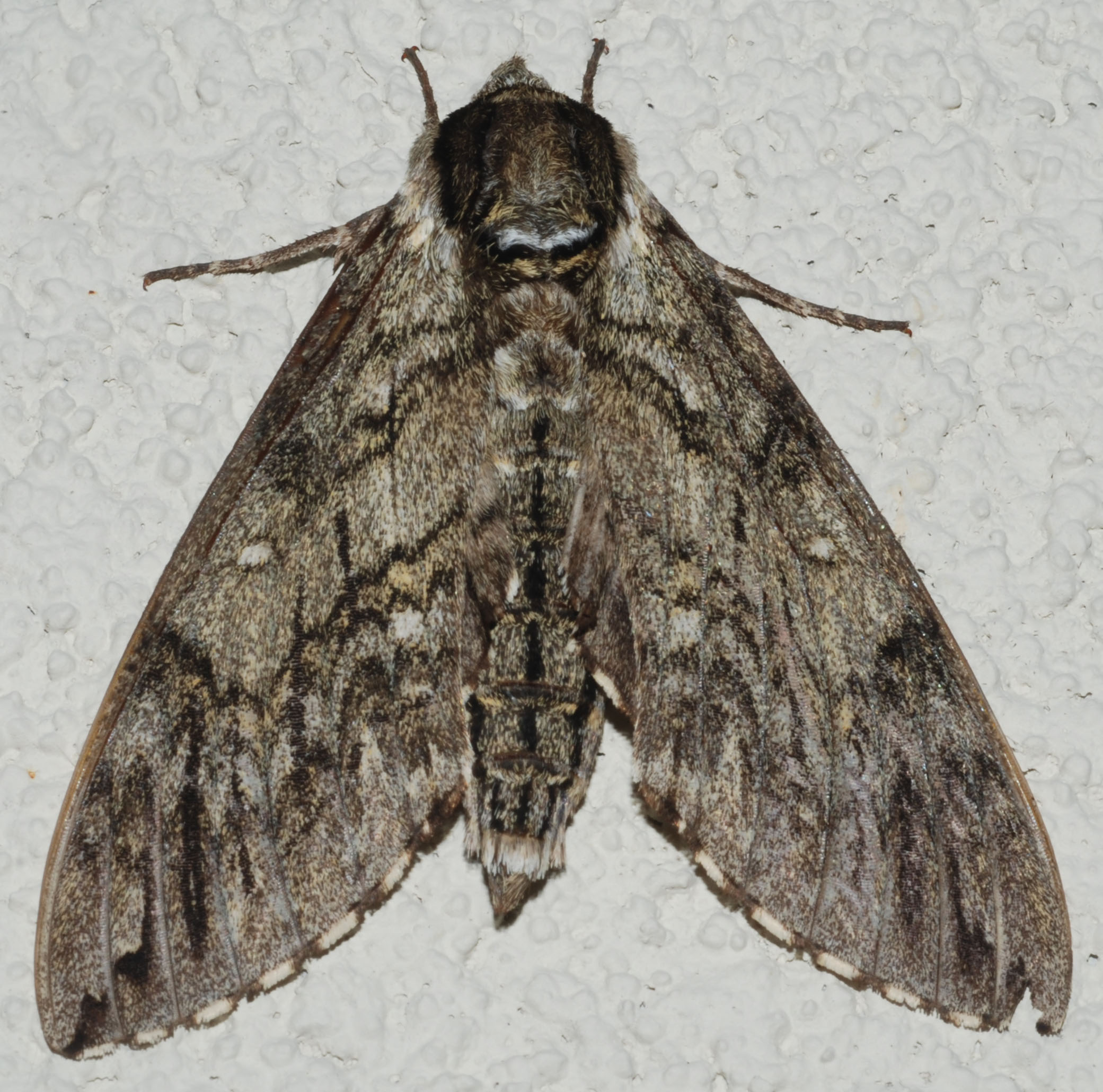
- Adult specimen

Scientific classification
- Domain: Eukaryota
- Kingdom: Animalia
- Phylum: Arthropoda
- Class: Insecta
- Order: Lepidoptera
- Family: Sphingidae
- Genus: Ceratomia
- Species: C. undulosa

Binomial name
- Ceratomia undulosa (Walker, 1856)

Synonyms
- Daremma undulosa Walker, 1856; Ceratomia repentinus Clemens, 1859; Ceratomia undulosa borealis Clark, 1929; Ceratomia undulosa engeli Chermock & Chermock, 1940

= Ceratomia undulosa =

Waved sphinx

Species of moth

Ceratomia undulosa, the waved sphinx, is a moth of the family Sphingidae. The species was first described by Francis Walker in 1856. Also known as the "Scorpion Moth" (See "Biology" Below").

== Distribution ==
It is found in the United States, and southern Canada, east of the Rocky Mountains. Adult moths are strictly nocturnal, hiding away as dawn approaches (Fullard & Napoleone 2001).

== Description ==
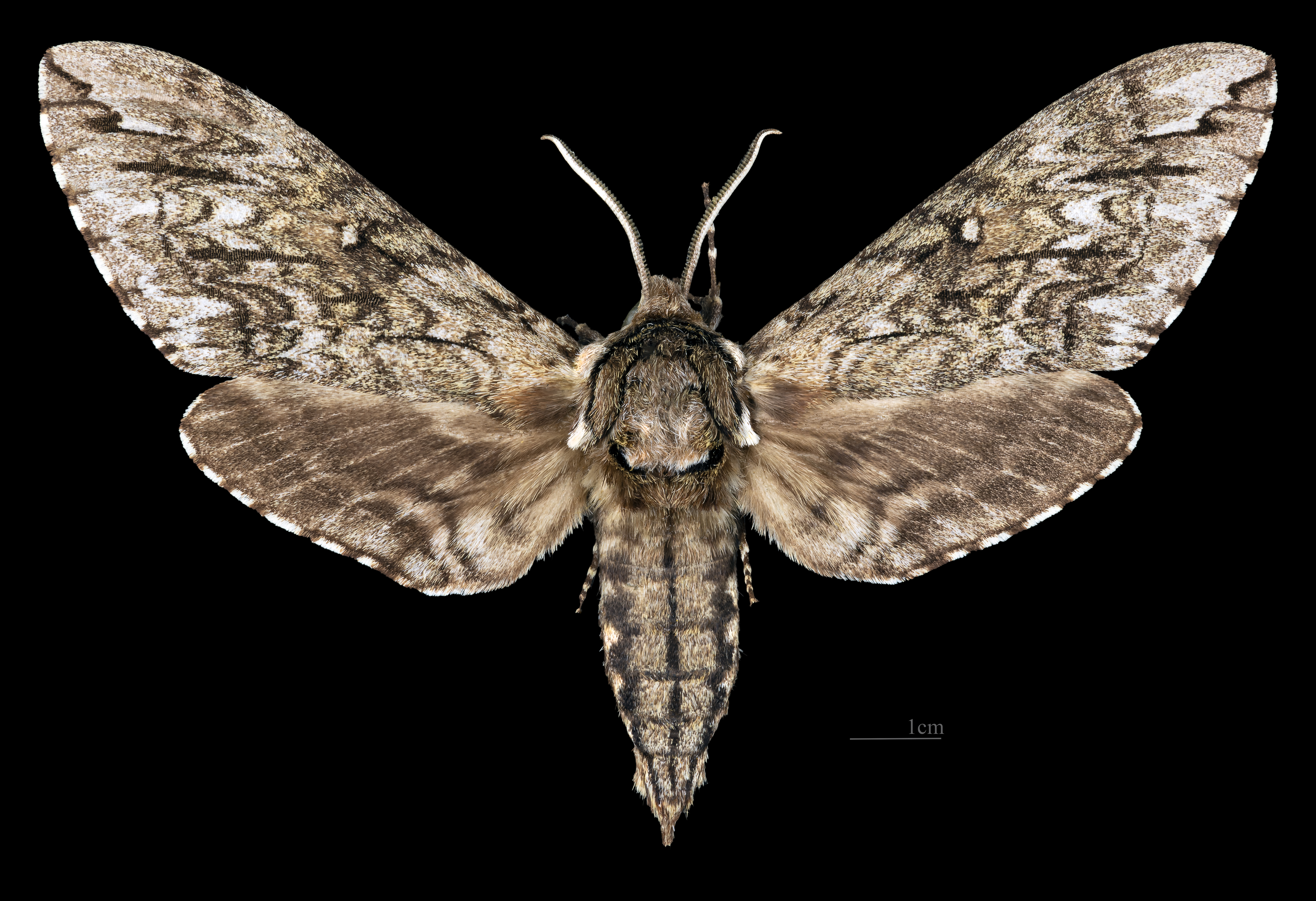
Male

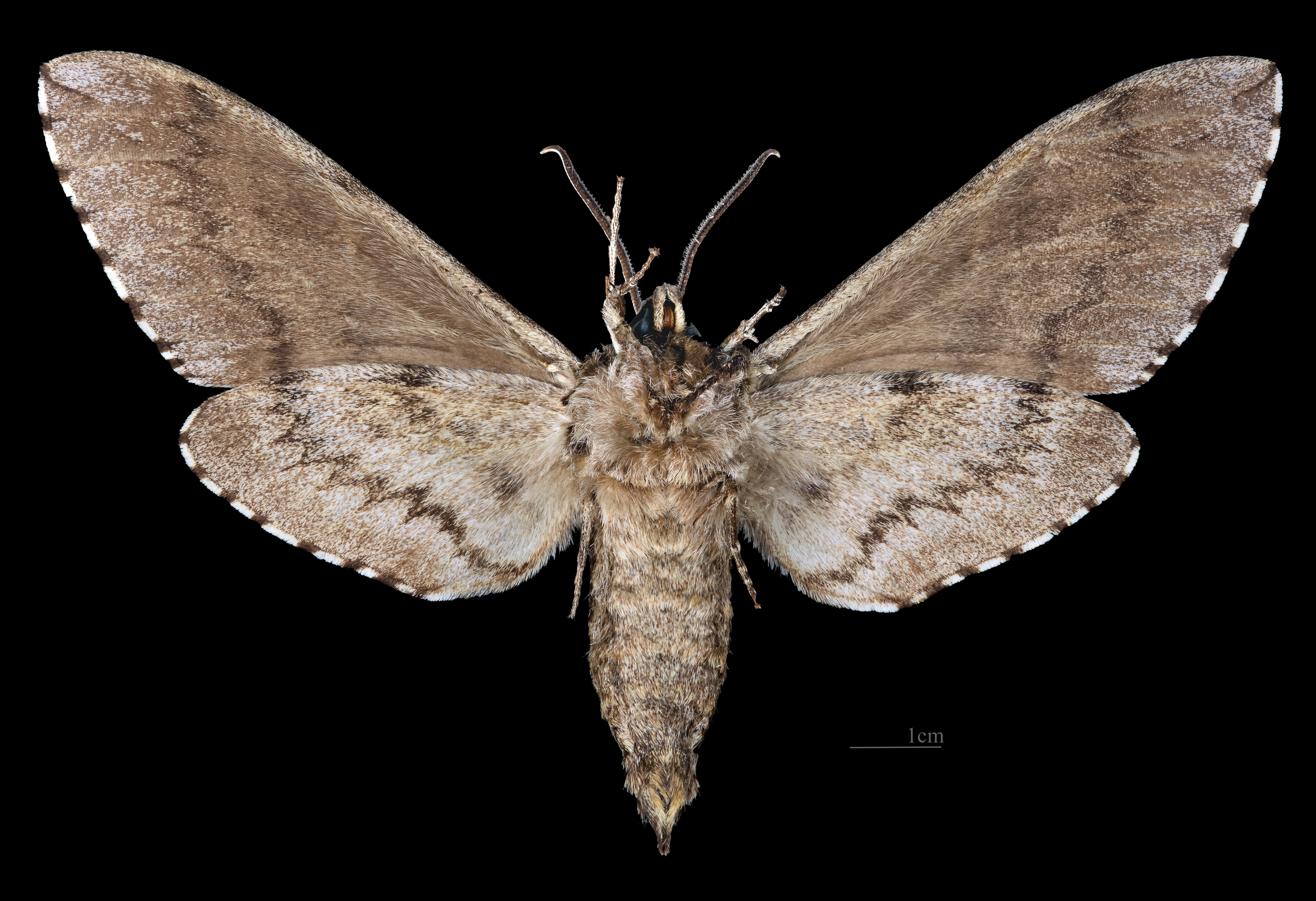
Male underside

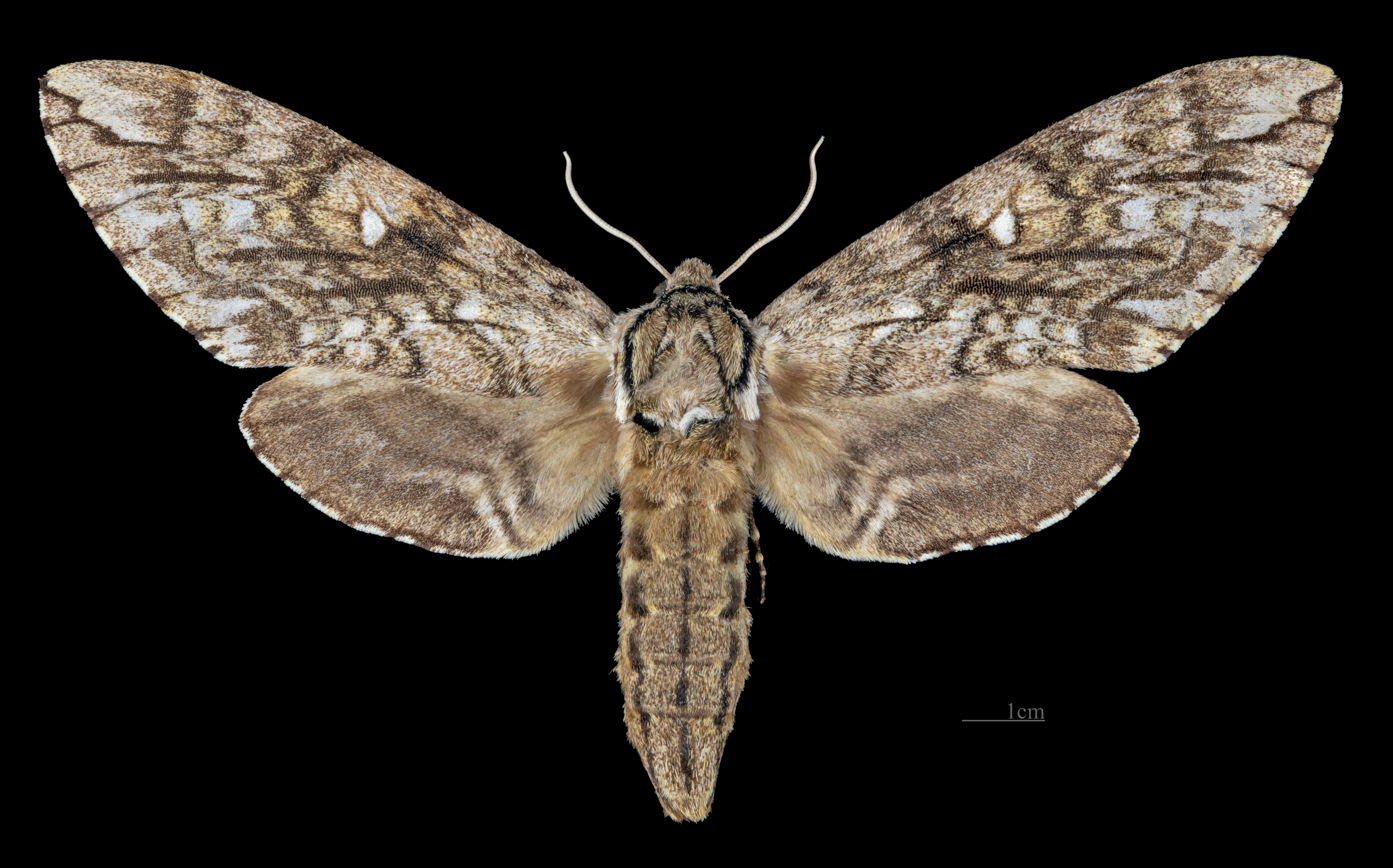
Female

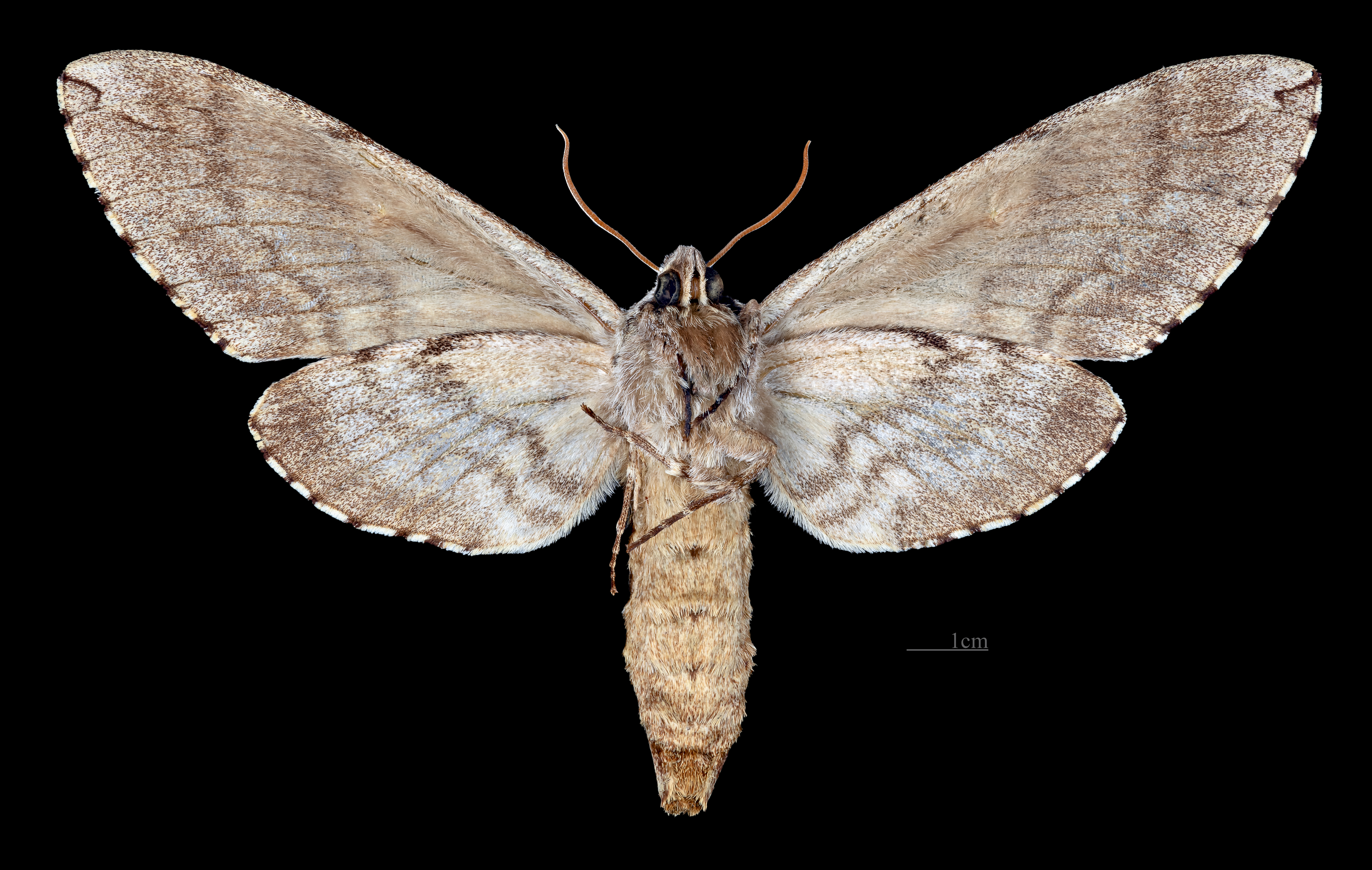
Female underside

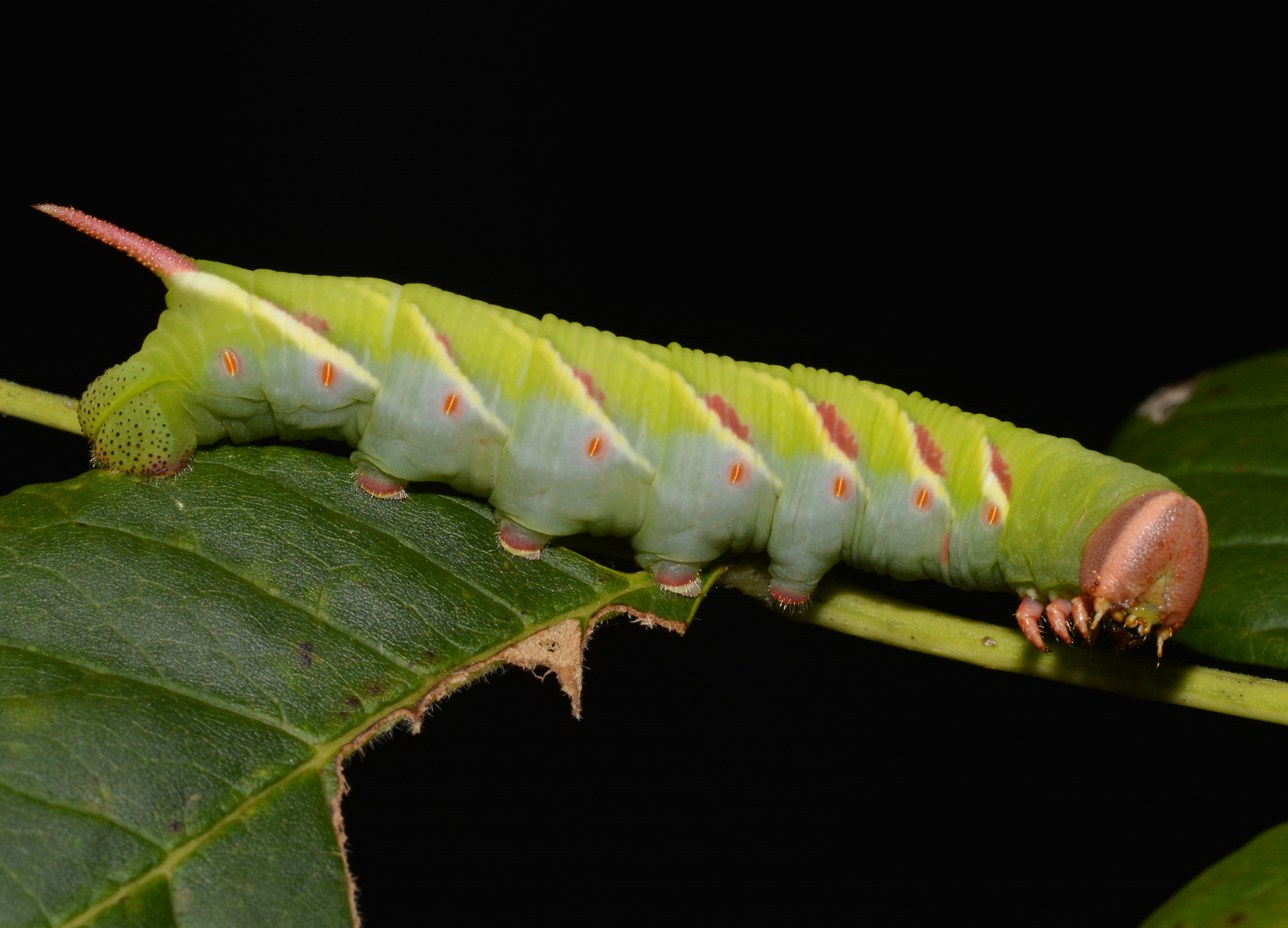
Caterpillar

== Biology ==
Recorded food plants of the larvae include ash (Fraxinus), privet (Ligustrum), oak (Quercus), hawthorn (Crataegus) and fringe tree (Chionanthus virginicus).

When ready, larvae dig underground to pupate.

The most common predator is the Guiana Striped Scorpion, which feasts on the moth's egg clusters. The common proximity of the two species, sometimes showing up as the moth lays her eggs, has resulted in erroneous conclusions that the moths give birth to the scorpions, and the resultant name "Scorpion Moth."

== Subspecies ==
- Ceratomia undulosa undulosa (from Prince Edward Island and Nova Scotia west to eastern Alberta and Maine to Florida west to the eastern Great Plains and south to Florida, the Gulf Coast and Texas)
- Ceratomia undulosa polingi Clark, 1929 (Mexico)
