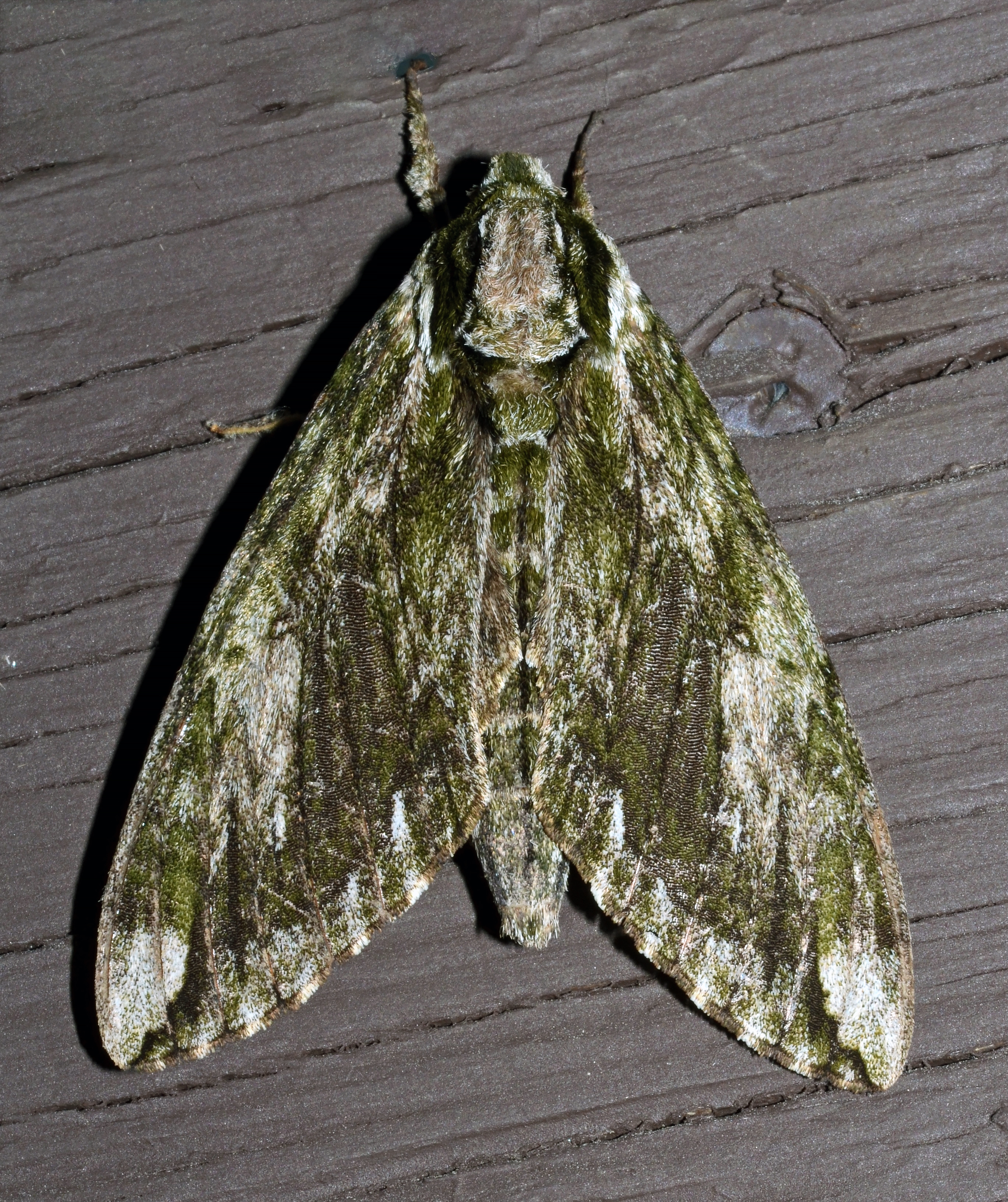

Scientific classification
- Domain: Eukaryota
- Kingdom: Animalia
- Phylum: Arthropoda
- Class: Insecta
- Order: Lepidoptera
- Family: Sphingidae
- Genus: Ceratomia
- Species: C. hageni

Binomial name
- Ceratomia hageni Grote, 1874

= Ceratomia hageni =

Hagen's sphinx

Species of moth

Ceratomia hageni, the Osage orange sphinx or Hagen's sphinx, is a hawk moth in the family Sphingidae. The species was first described by Augustus Radcliffe Grote in 1874.

== Distribution ==
Ceratomia hageni is a native of midwest North America and can be found from Michigan to Georgia, Nebraska to Texas, and most places in between, with regards to its only known host plant.

== Biology ==
From oviposition of the eggs to pupation, approximately four weeks will pass. Where multiple broods occur, pupae will eclose in two weeks, or when conditions are suitable in cool climates. An adult C. hageni has many colors, viewable when looked over thoroughly. The forewing is grayish-green and has many, wavy lines, similar to other specimens of the Ceratomia genera. The hindwing is a browner gray with a lighter gray towards the outer margins

=== Food plants ===
C. hageni is known to feed on only one food;

- Maclura pomifera (Osage orange)

== Description ==
=== Egg ===
The eggs are translucent, milky white and green, oval and about 0.5 mm in diameter. They are laid in masses on the undersurface of leaves, while smaller masses are deposited onto branches on the Osage orange tree. Eggs incubate and hatch five to seven days after oviposition.

=== Pupa ===
As with most other Sphingidae, Ceratomia hageni will burrow into the ground after its fifth and final instar in order to pupate. The larvae will go into a "wandering" stage where it leaves the Osage orange tree and climbs to the ground to find a place to bury itself so that it may pupate. The larvae will then shed its fifth instar skin to reveal its pupal skin, which will be soft and almost translucent at first, but will then harden to a light brown for protection from the elements.

=== Imago ===
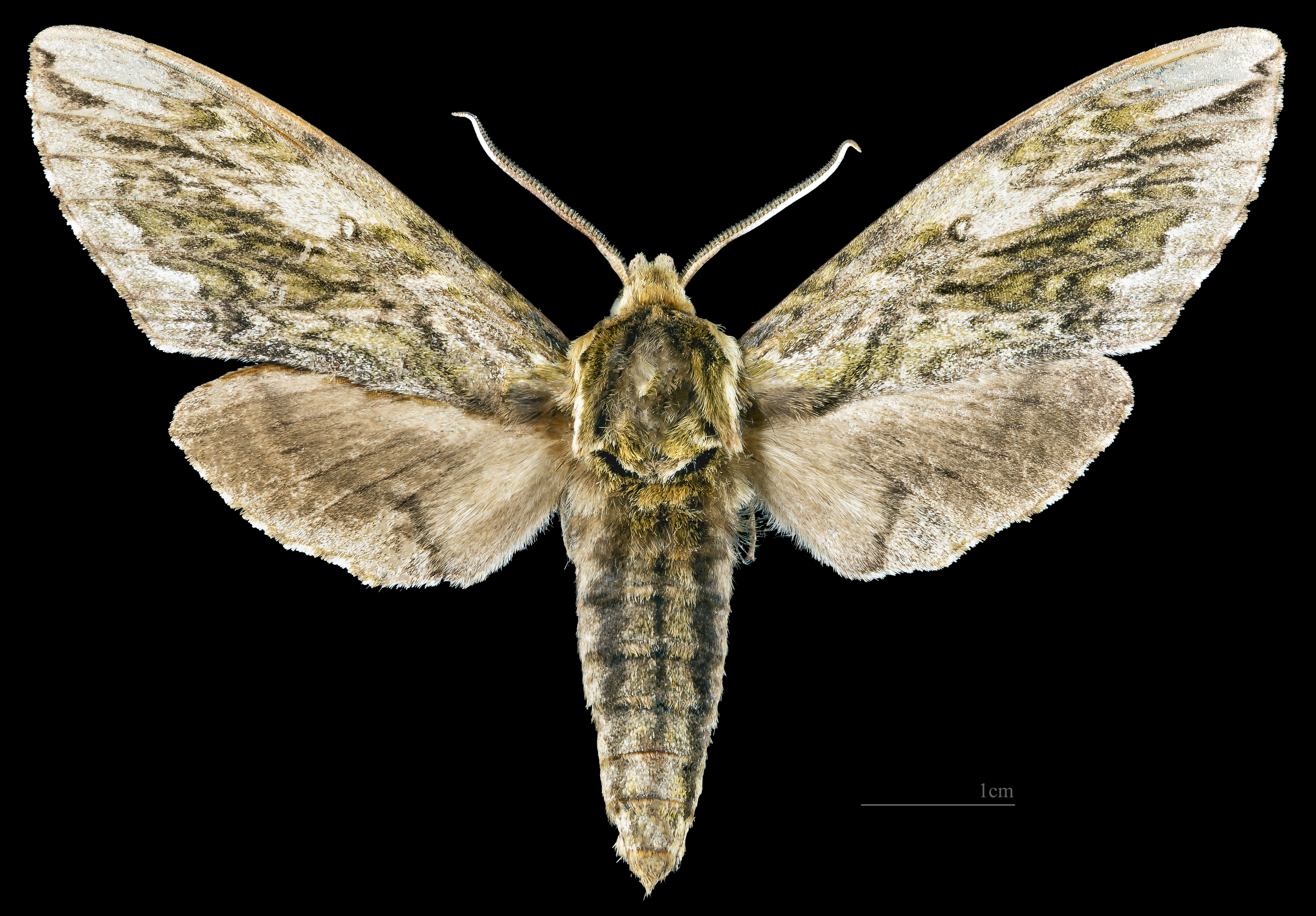
Ceratomia hageni ♂

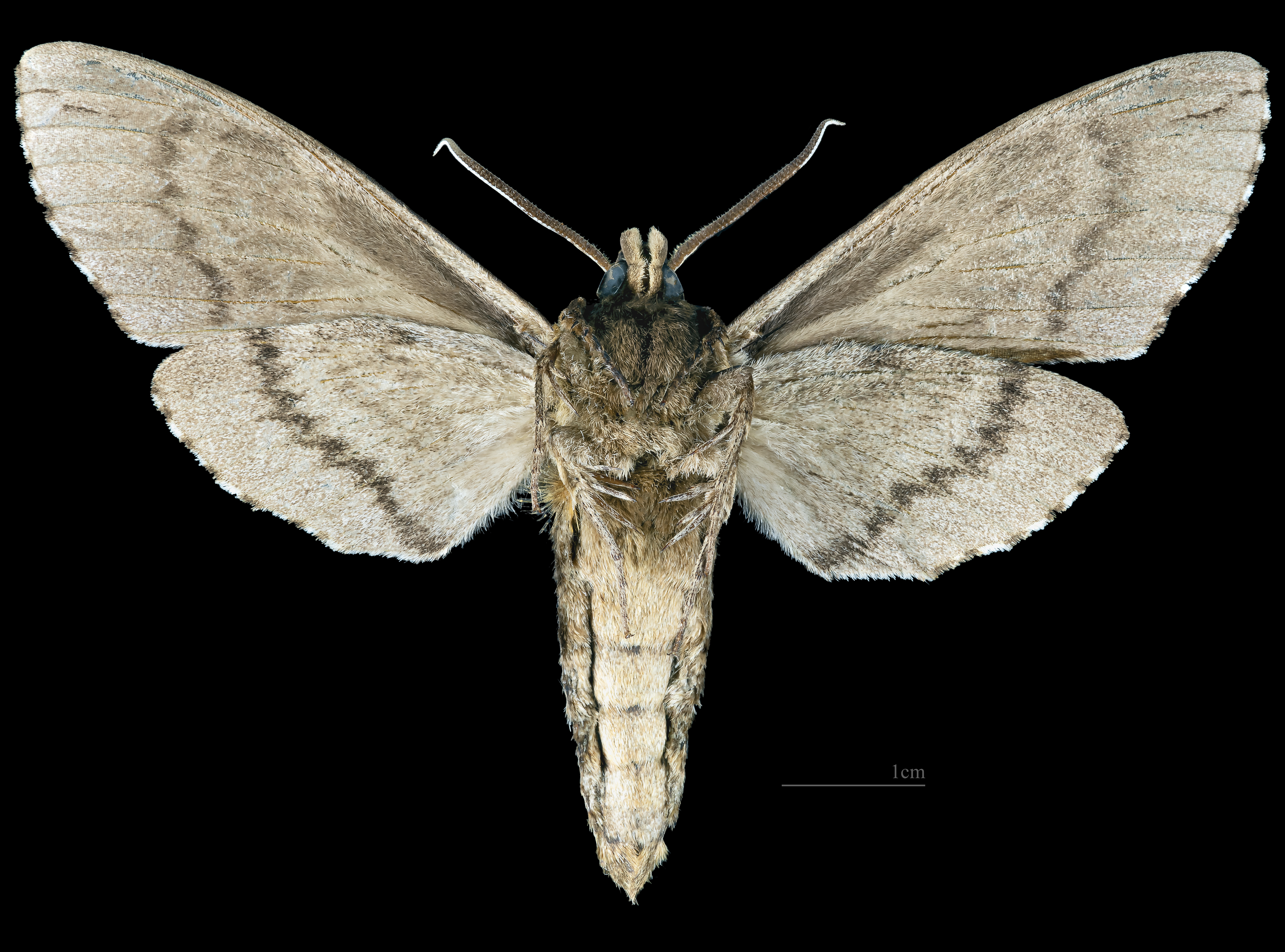
Ceratomia hageni ♂ △
