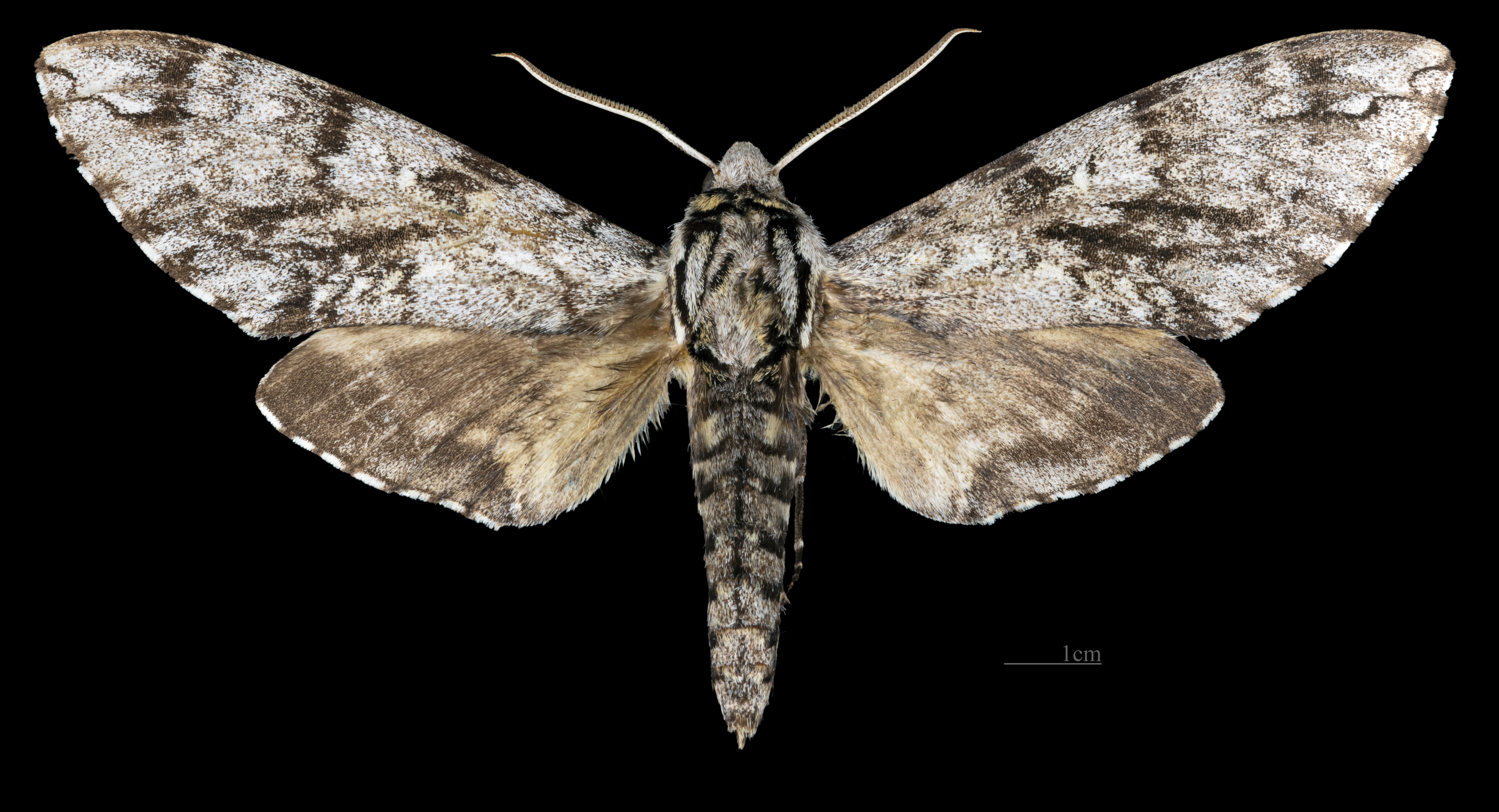
- Male dorsal
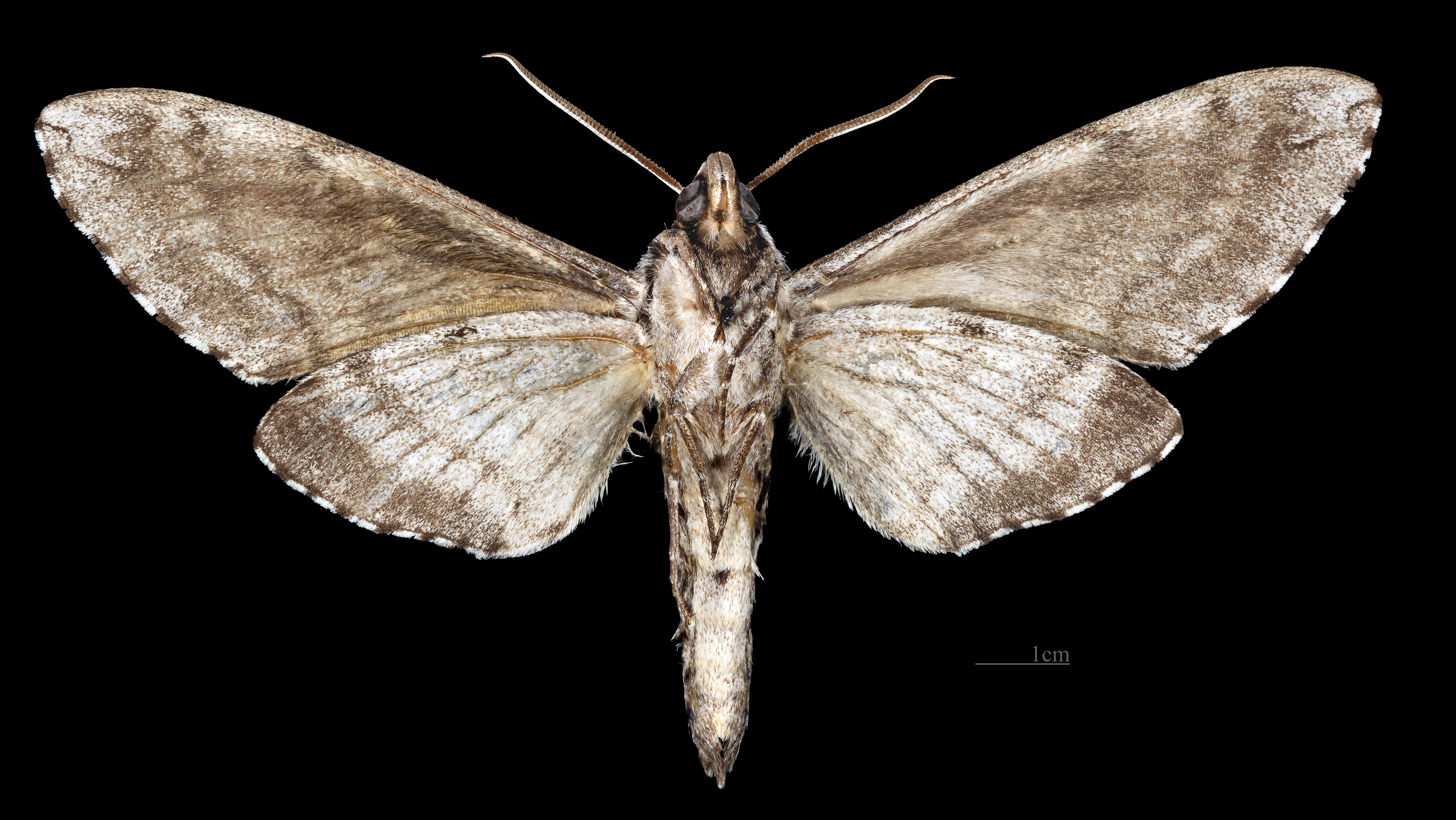
- Male ventral

Scientific classification
- Domain: Eukaryota
- Kingdom: Animalia
- Phylum: Arthropoda
- Class: Insecta
- Order: Lepidoptera
- Family: Sphingidae
- Genus: Ceratomia
- Species: C. sonorensis

Binomial name
- Ceratomia sonorensis Hodges, 1971

= Ceratomia sonorensis =

Sonoran sphinx

Species of moth

Ceratomia sonorensis, the Sonoran sphinx, is a moth of the family Sphingidae. It is known from high altitudes in oak and oak-pine associations in Madrean woodland in Sonora, Mexico and in south-eastern Arizona.

The wingspan is 84–89 mm.

There is one generation per year with adults on wing from July to August.

The larvae feed on Fraxinus species.
