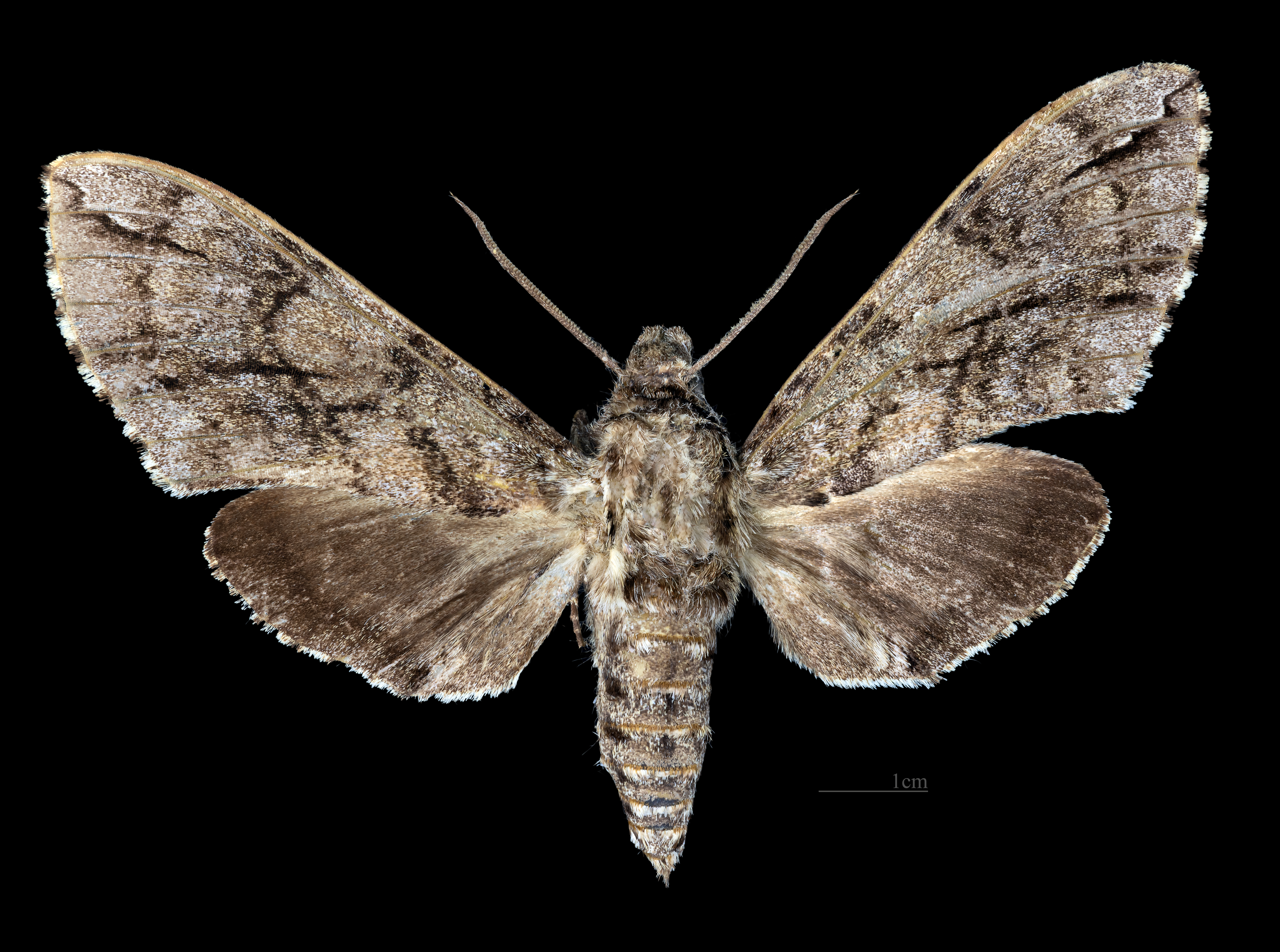
- Male dorsal
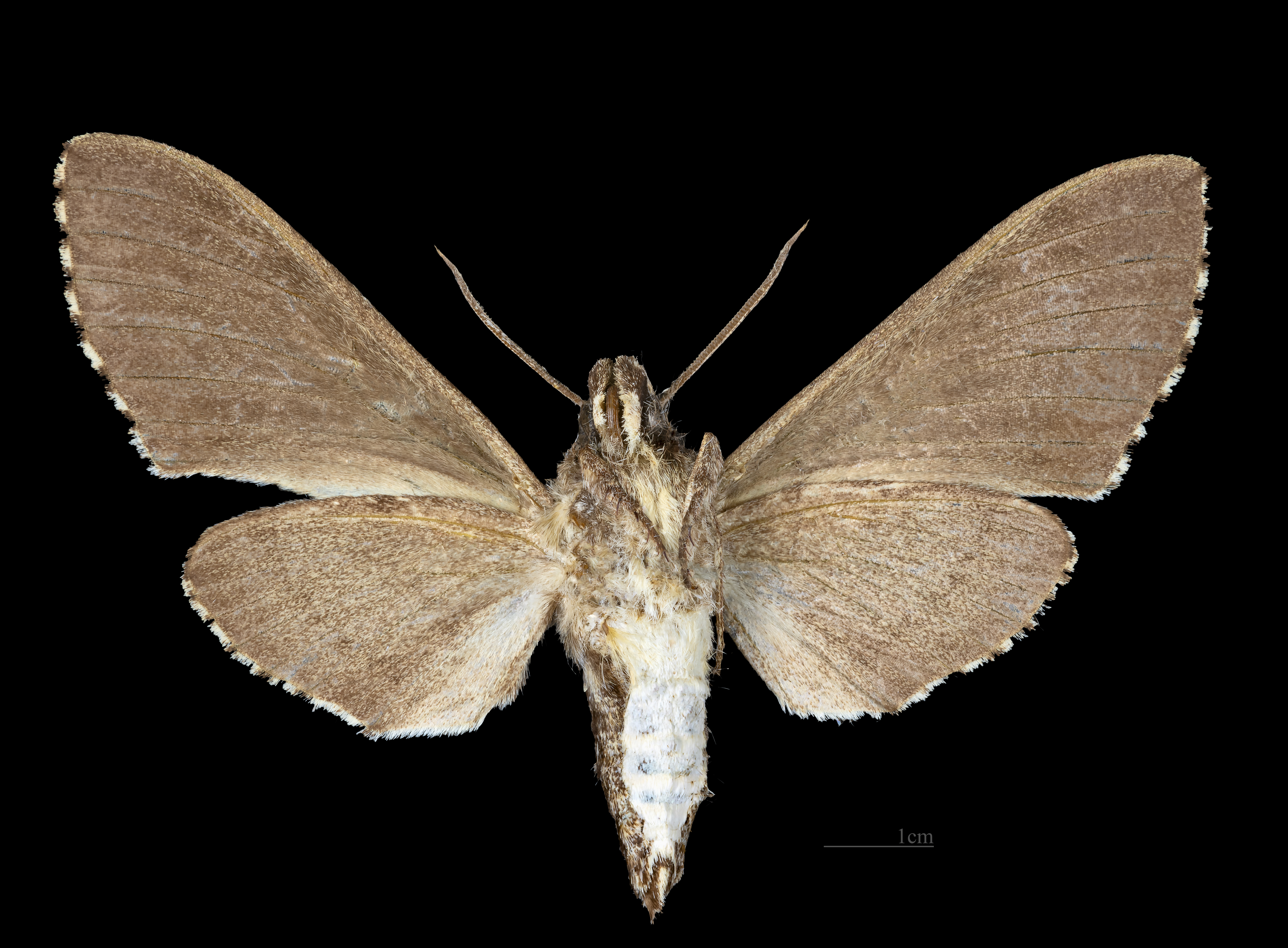
- Male ventral

Scientific classification
- Domain: Eukaryota
- Kingdom: Animalia
- Phylum: Arthropoda
- Class: Insecta
- Order: Lepidoptera
- Family: Sphingidae
- Genus: Ceratomia
- Species: C. igualana

Binomial name
- Ceratomia igualana Schaus, 1932

Synonyms
- Dolbogene igualana (Schaus, 1932)

= Ceratomia igualana =

Species of moth

Ceratomia igualana is a moth of the family Sphingidae. It is found from Mexico to Costa Rica. Only a small number has been caught and not much is known about the biology of this species.

The wingspan is 51–56 mm for males and about 65 mm for females.

== Sources ==
- James P. Tuttle: The Hawkmoths of North America, A Natural History Study of the Sphingidae of the United States and Canada, The Wedge Entomological Research Foundation, Washington, DC 2007, ISBN 978-0-9796633-0-7.
