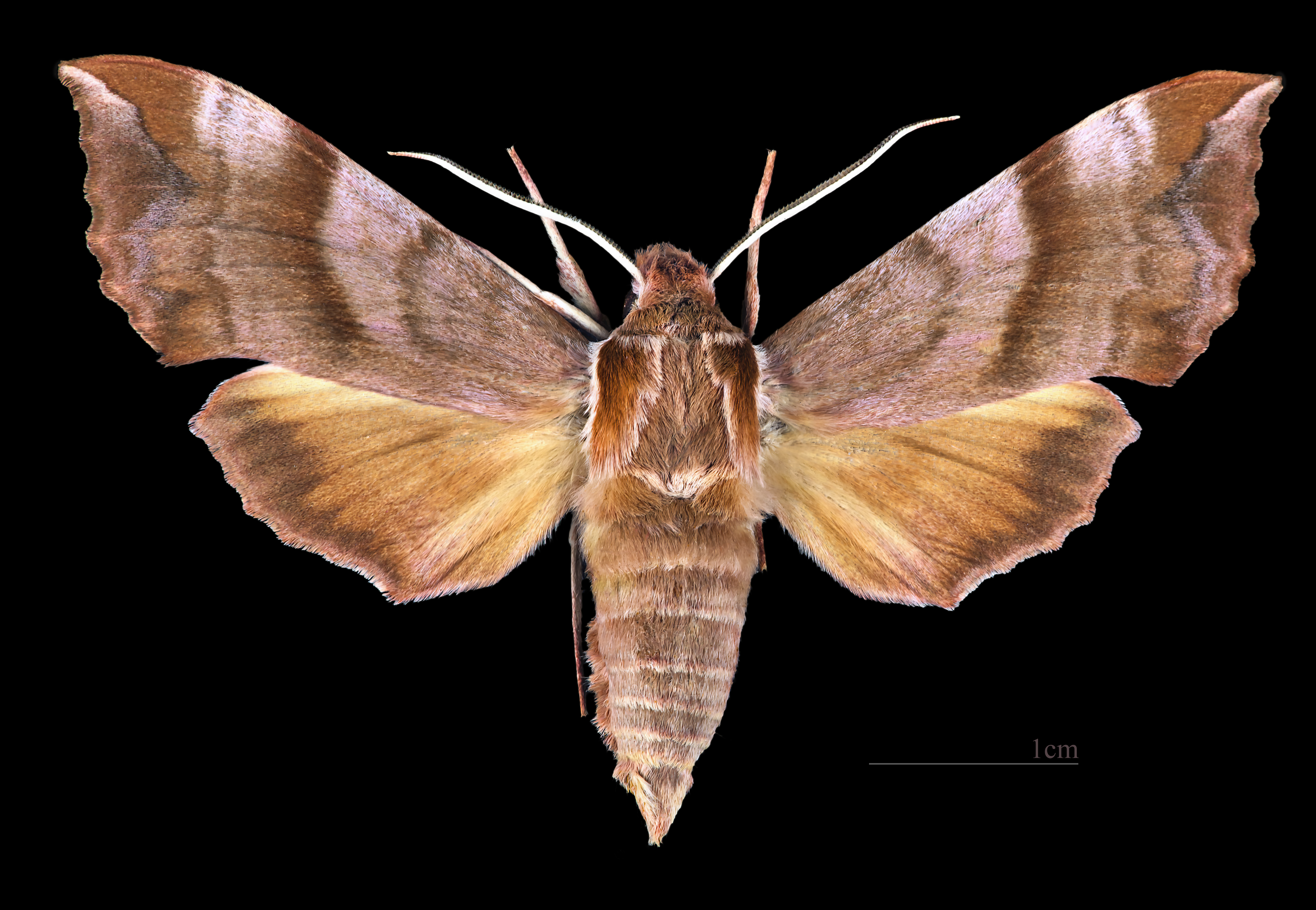
- Clarina syriaca ♂
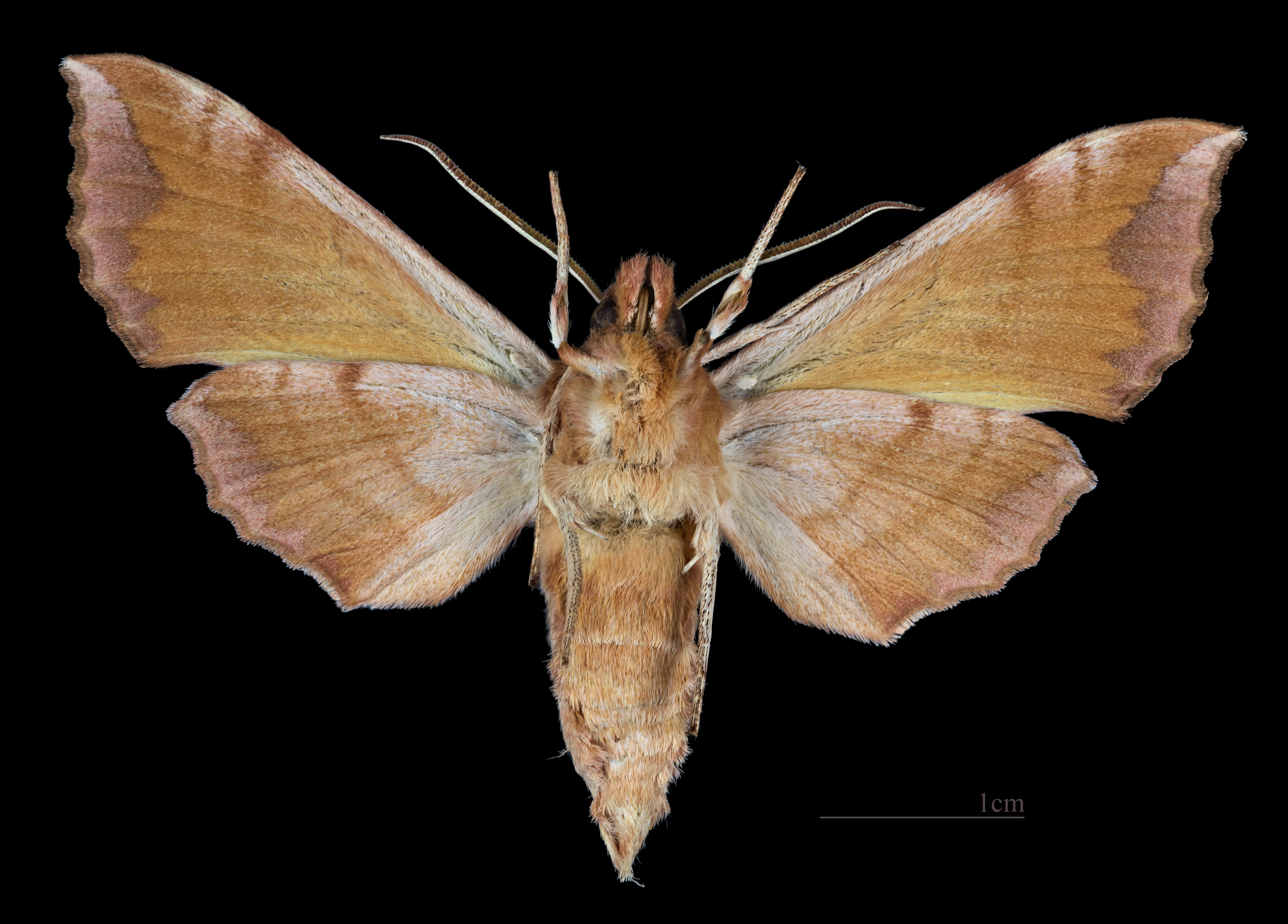
- Clarina syriaca ♂ △

Scientific classification
- Kingdom: Animalia
- Phylum: Arthropoda
- Clade: Pancrustacea
- Class: Insecta
- Order: Lepidoptera
- Family: Sphingidae
- Genus: Clarina
- Species: C. syriaca

Binomial name
- Clarina syriaca (Lederer, 1855)

Synonyms
- Deilephila syriaca Lederer, 1855; Clarina syriaca grisescens (Ebert, 1976)

= Clarina syriaca =

Species of moth

Clarina syriaca is a moth of the family Sphingidae. *

== Distribution ==
It is found in West Asia It is often treated as a subspecies of Clarina kotschyi.

== Description ==
The wingspan is 50–65 mm. It is variable in colour (some individuals are more tawny than others) and size. Males are paler than females. The forewing upperside bands and lines are distinct. The pattern is similar to that of Darapsa choerilus. There are two generations per year with adults on wing from May to early July and again in August and September.

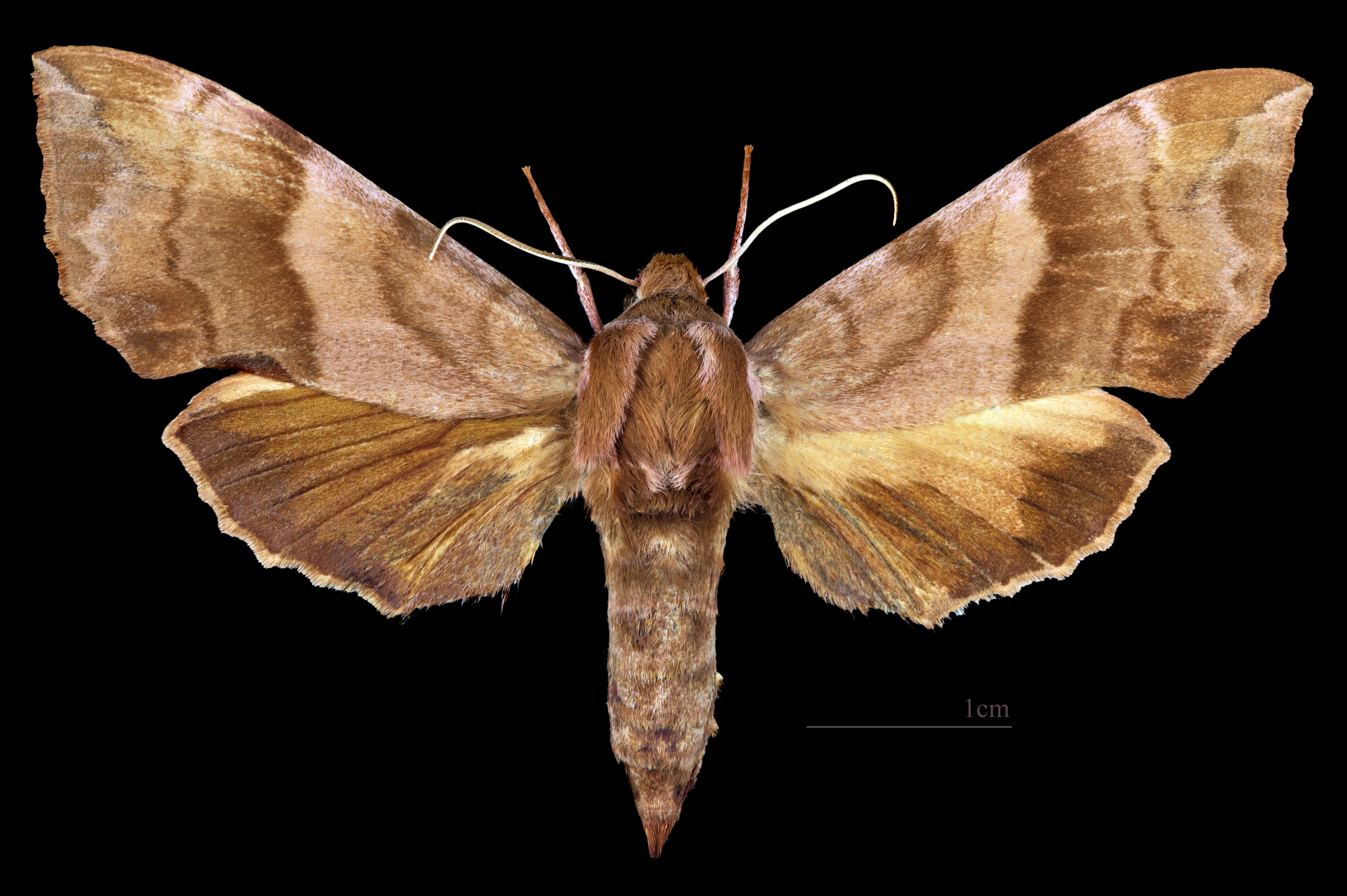
Clarina syriaca ♀

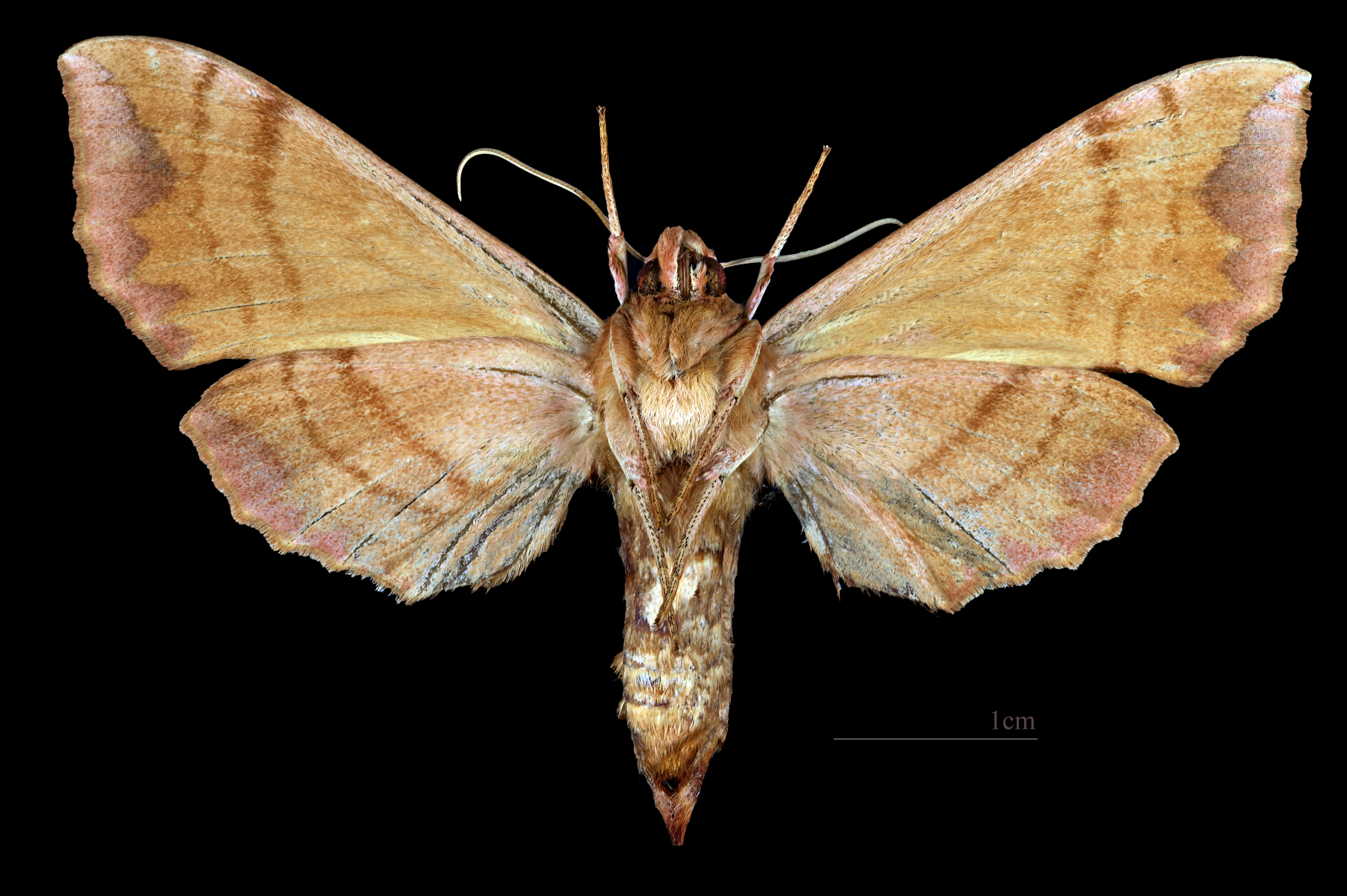
Clarina syriaca ♀ △

== Biology ==
The larvae have been recorded feeding on Vitis and Parthenocissus species.
