= Clarina =

Clarina may refer to:

== Places ==
- Clarina (County Limerick), a village in Ireland
- Clarina, Ontario, Canada, a community in Douro-Dummer township

== People ==
- Clarina I. H. Nichols (1810–1885), American women's rights activist
- Baron Clarina, title in the Peerage of Ireland, including a list of holders of that title

== Other uses ==
- Clarina (moth), a genus
- Heckel-clarina, a woodwind instrument
