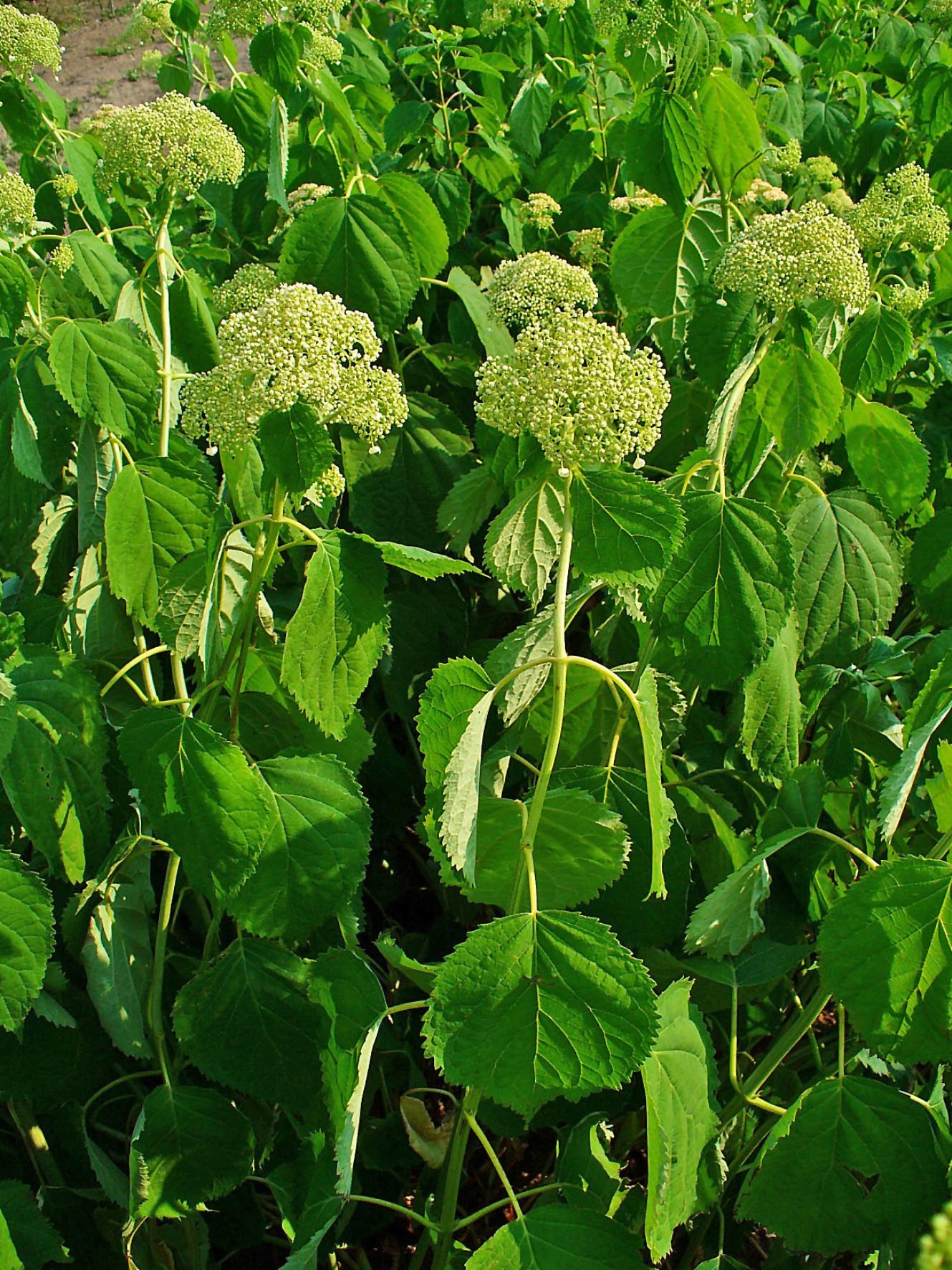

Conservation status
- Secure (NatureServe)

Scientific classification
- Kingdom: Plantae
- Clade: Tracheophytes
- Clade: Angiosperms
- Clade: Eudicots
- Clade: Asterids
- Order: Cornales
- Family: Hydrangeaceae
- Genus: Hydrangea
- Species: H. arborescens

Binomial name
- Hydrangea arborescens L.

= Hydrangea arborescens =

Species of flowering plant

Hydrangea arborescens, commonly known as smooth hydrangea or sevenbark, is a species of flowering plant in the family Hydrangeaceae. It is a small- to medium-sized, multi-stemmed, deciduous shrub up to 2 m (7 ft) tall that is native to the eastern United States.

== Description ==
The inflorescence is a corymb up to 15 centimetres (5.9 in) wide. Showy, sterile flowers are usually absent or if present they are usually less than 1 cm in diameter on the edge of the panicles. Flowering occurs May to July. Fruit is a ribbed, brown capsule about 2 mm long. Many are produced in October and persist through the winter.

The leaves are large (8 to 18 cm long), opposite, serrated, ovate, and deciduous. The lower leaf surface is glabrous or with inconspicuous fine hairs, appearing green; trichomes of the lower surface are restricted to the midrib and major veins.

The stem bark has a peculiar tendency to peel off in several successive thin layers with different colors, hence the common name "sevenbark".

Smooth hydrangea can spread rapidly by stolons to form colonies.

== Taxonomy ==
At one time both ashy hydrangea (Hydrangea cinerea) and silverleaf hydrangea (Hydrangea radiata) were considered subspecies of smooth hydrangea. However, most taxonomists now consider them to be separate species.

== Distribution and habitat ==
Smooth hydrangea is widely distributed across the eastern United States—from southern New York to the panhandle of Florida, west to eastern Oklahoma and southeastern Kansas. It is mainly found in mesic soils under the canopy of deciduous forests and is frequently found along small water courses and on woodland road waysides. It is common in the Delaware River Valley and in the Appalachian Mountains.

It is a host plant of the hydrangea sphinx moth.

== Uses ==
This attractive shrub is often cultivated for ornamental use. In the UK the cultivar 'Annabelle' has gained the Royal Horticultural Society's Award of Garden Merit. The cultivar 'Grandiflora' has inflorescences which resemble snowballs, similar to Viburnum opulus 'Roseum'.

Smooth hydrangea root was used medicinally by the Cherokee, and later, by early settlers for treatment of kidney and bladder stones.

It has additionally been marked as a pollinator plant, supporting and attracting bees and butterflies.

Several cultivars of Hydrangea arborescens differ in flower colour, inflorescence size and stem strength. 'Annabelle' is known for its large, rounded white flower heads, which can become heavy and cause the stems to bend, especially after rain. 'Incrediball' ('Abetwo') is a similar cultivar bred for stronger stems and large flower heads. Pink-flowered cultivars, including those sold under the 'Invincibelle' name, offer an alternative to the traditional white forms. When choosing a cultivar, gardeners should consider not only flower appearance but also the plant's growth habit, stem strength and the space available in the garden.

== Gallery ==
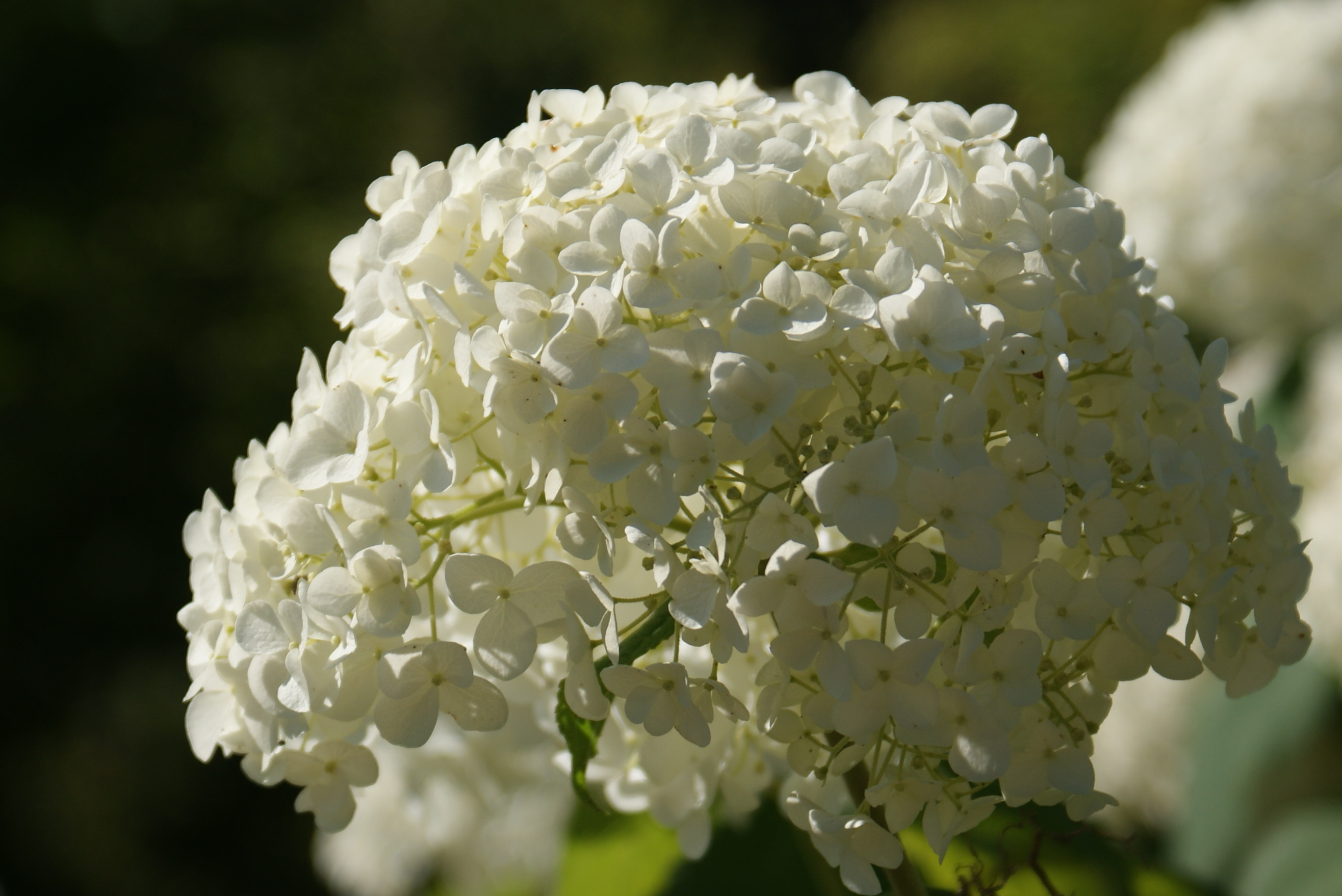
'Annabelle'

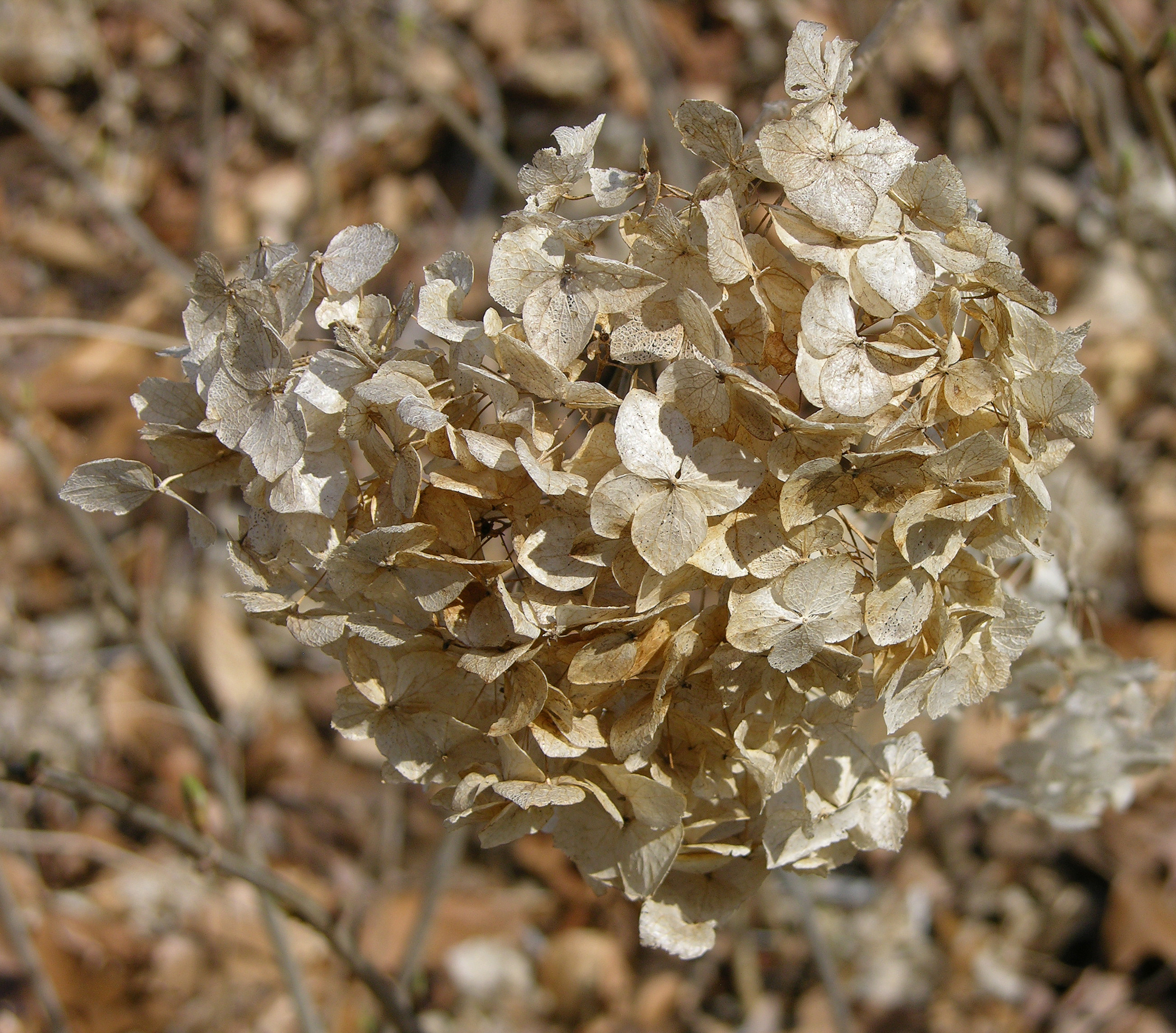
'Grandiflora'

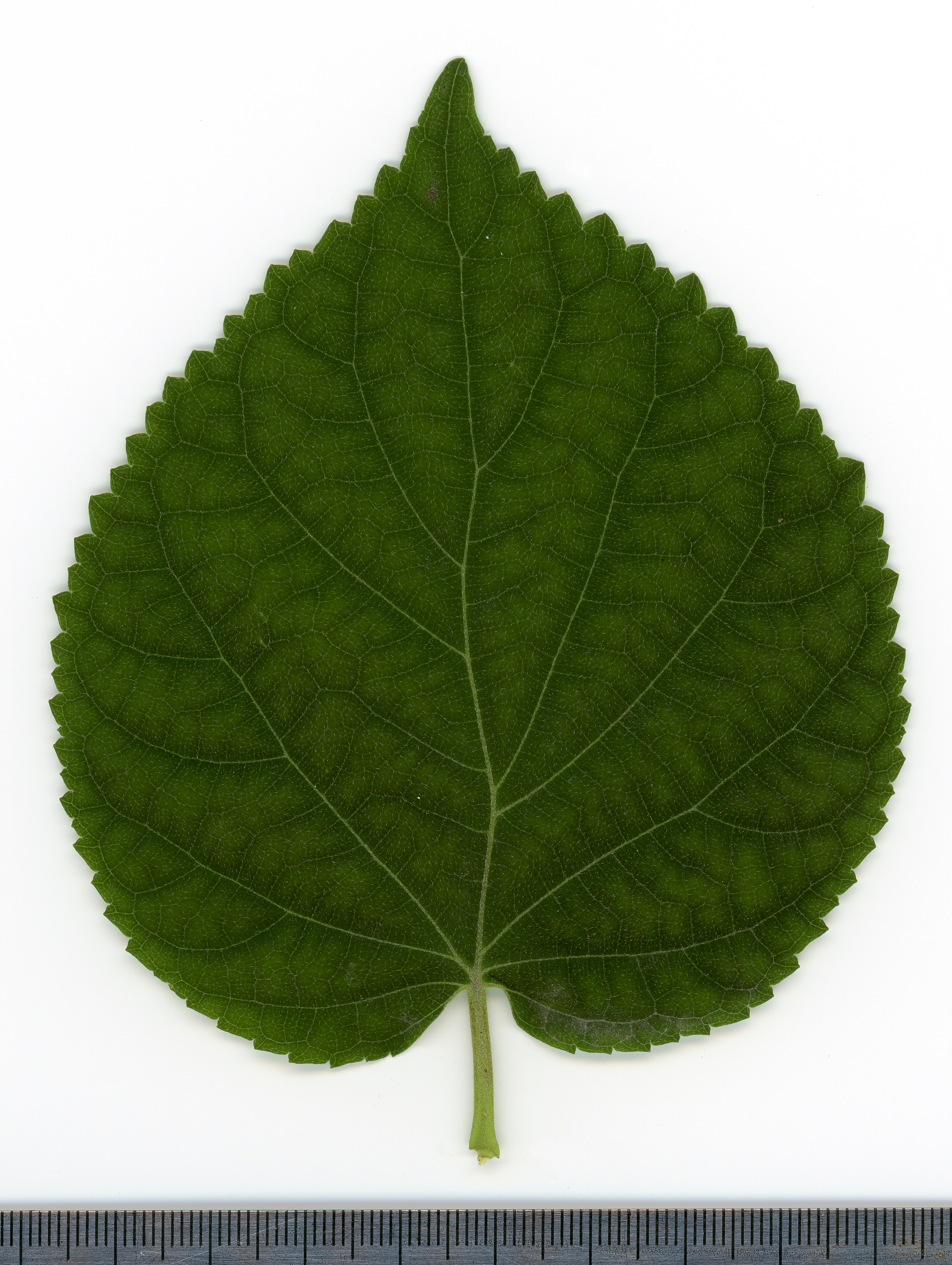
Leaf adaxial side

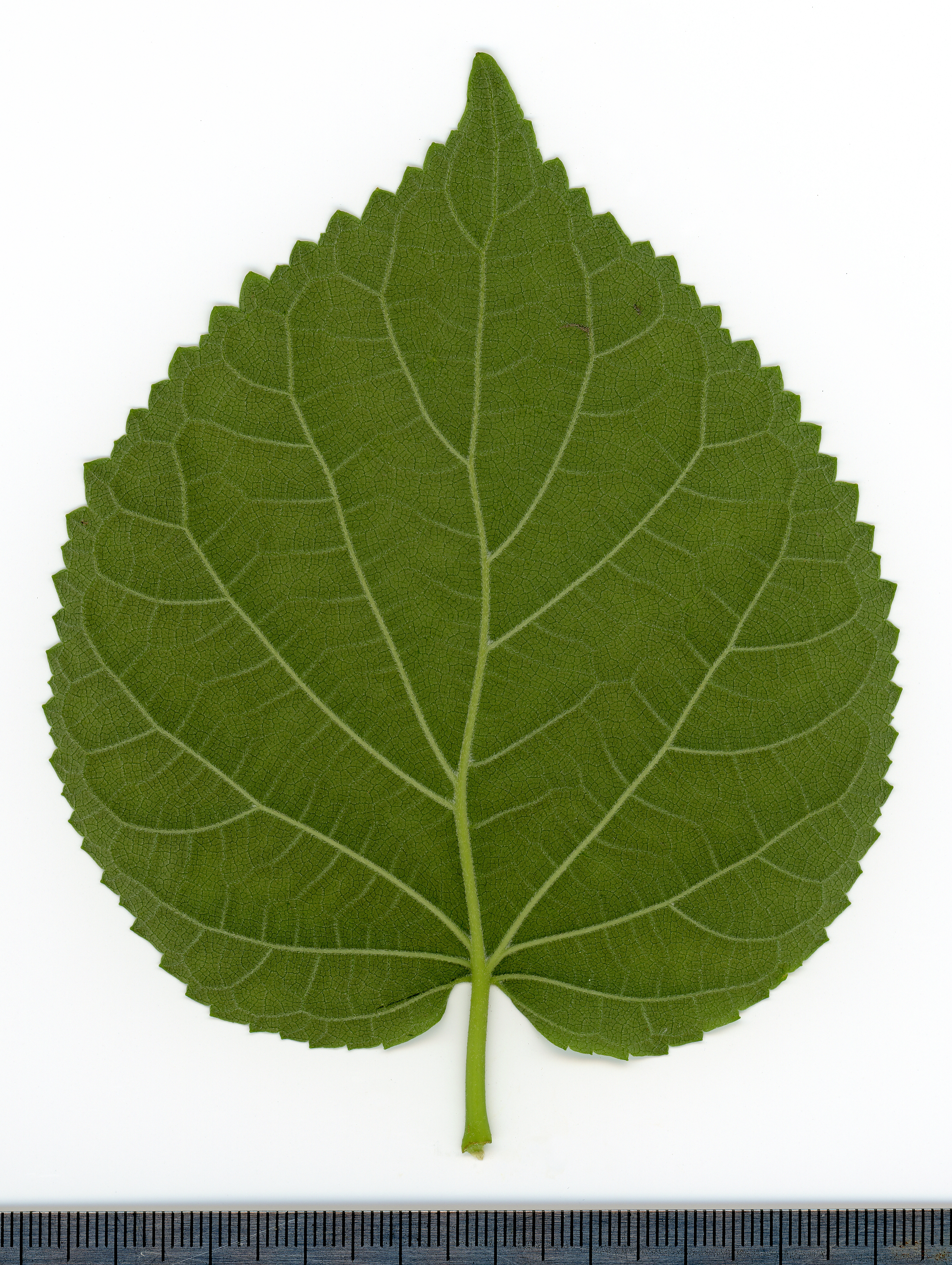
Leaf abaxial side
