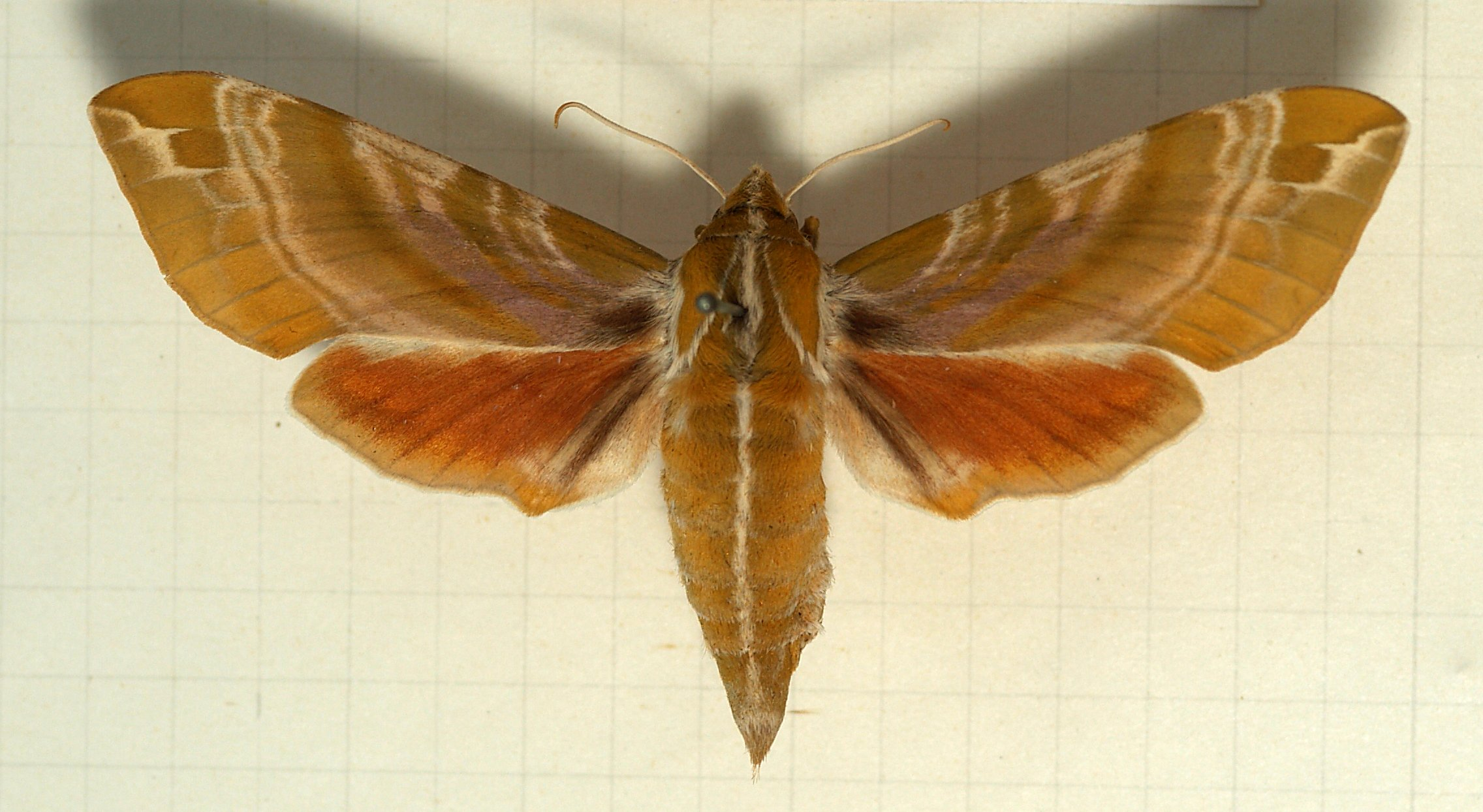

Scientific classification
- Domain: Eukaryota
- Kingdom: Animalia
- Phylum: Arthropoda
- Class: Insecta
- Order: Lepidoptera
- Family: Sphingidae
- Genus: Darapsa
- Species: D. versicolor

Binomial name
- Darapsa versicolor (Harris, 1839)

Synonyms
- Choerocampa versicolor Harris, 1839; Ampeloeca versicolor; Ampeloeca versicolor lutescens Clark, 1920

= Darapsa versicolor =

Hydrangea sphinx

Species of moth

Darapsa versicolor, the hydrangea sphinx, is a moth species of the family Sphingidae that inhabits eastern North America, often in wetlands. It was first described by Thaddeus William Harris in 1839.

Its wingspan can reach 58 to 80 mm, and its forewings are green brown with curved white patches. In the northern portion of its range there is one flight from June to July and in the southern range it is seen during the warm months.

The caterpillar of this species feeds on wild hydrangea (Hydrangea arborescens), buttonbush (Cephalanthus occidentalis), and water-willow (Decodon verticillatus).
