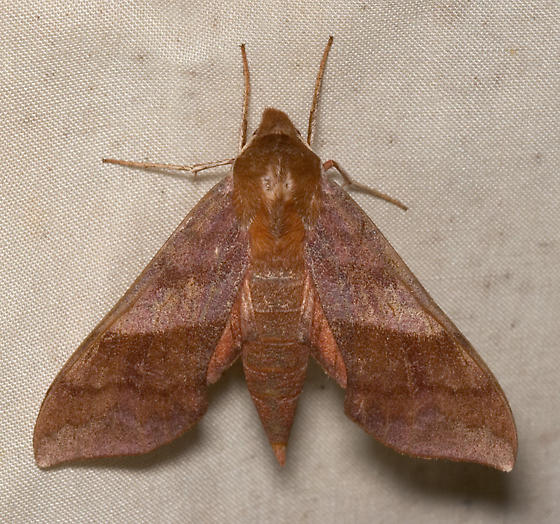
- Darapsa choerilus

Scientific classification
- Domain: Eukaryota
- Kingdom: Animalia
- Phylum: Arthropoda
- Class: Insecta
- Order: Lepidoptera
- Family: Sphingidae
- Tribe: Macroglossini
- Genus: Darapsa; Walker, 1856

Synonyms
- Ampeloeca Rothschild & Jordan, 1903; Everyx Ménétriés, 1857; Otus Hübner, 1819

= Darapsa =

Genus of moths

Darapsa is a genus of moths in the family Sphingidae first described by Francis Walker in 1856.

== Species ==
- Darapsa choerilus (Cramer, 1779)
- Darapsa myron (Cramer, 1779)
- Darapsa versicolor (Harris, 1839)
