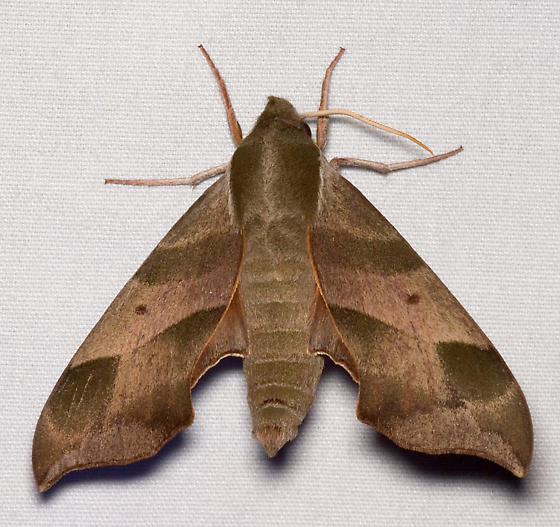
- Darapsa myron, adult
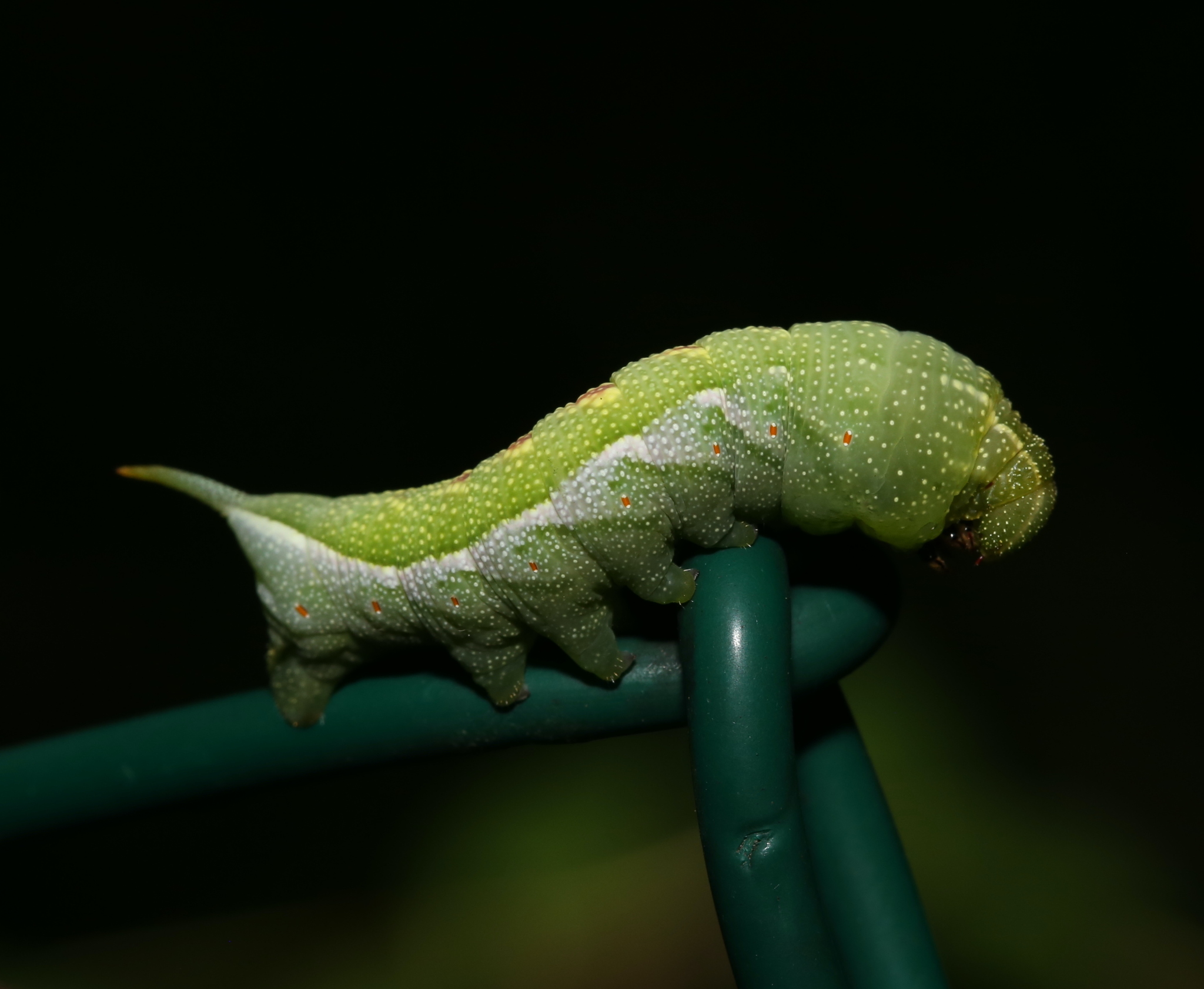
- Larva

Scientific classification
- Kingdom: Animalia
- Phylum: Arthropoda
- Clade: Pancrustacea
- Class: Insecta
- Order: Lepidoptera
- Family: Sphingidae
- Genus: Darapsa
- Species: D. myron

Binomial name
- Darapsa myron (Cramer, 1780)

Synonyms
- Sphinx myron Cramer, 1779; Sphinx pampinatrix J.E. Smith, 1797; Otus cnotus Hübner, 1823; Ampeloeca myron isatis Debauche, 1934; Ampeloeca myron lutescens Clark, 1920; Ampeloeca myron texana Clark, 1920; Ampeloeca myron mexicana Gehlen, 1933

= Darapsa myron =

Species of moth

Darapsa myron, the Virginia creeper sphinx or the Green Grapevine Sphinx, is a species of moth in the family Sphingidae. It is found in central and eastern North America.

== Distribution ==
in Canada it is found in southern Ontario and Quebec, and in the United States is found from Maine south to south Florida; west to North Dakota, Nebraska, New Mexico, Oklahoma, and Texas. It is also found in Mexico.

The moths prefer woodland or brush habitats.

== Description ==
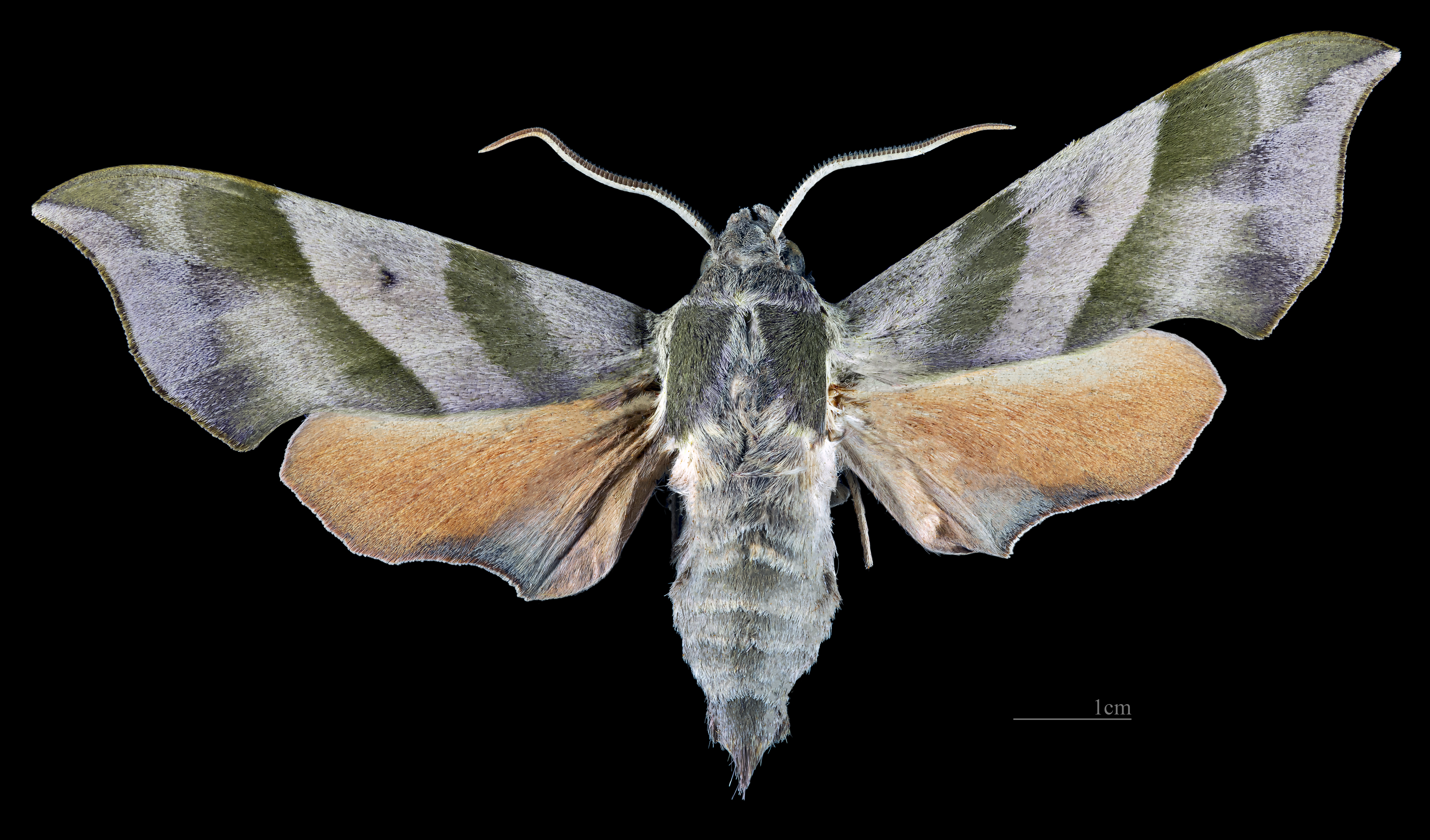
Male dorsal

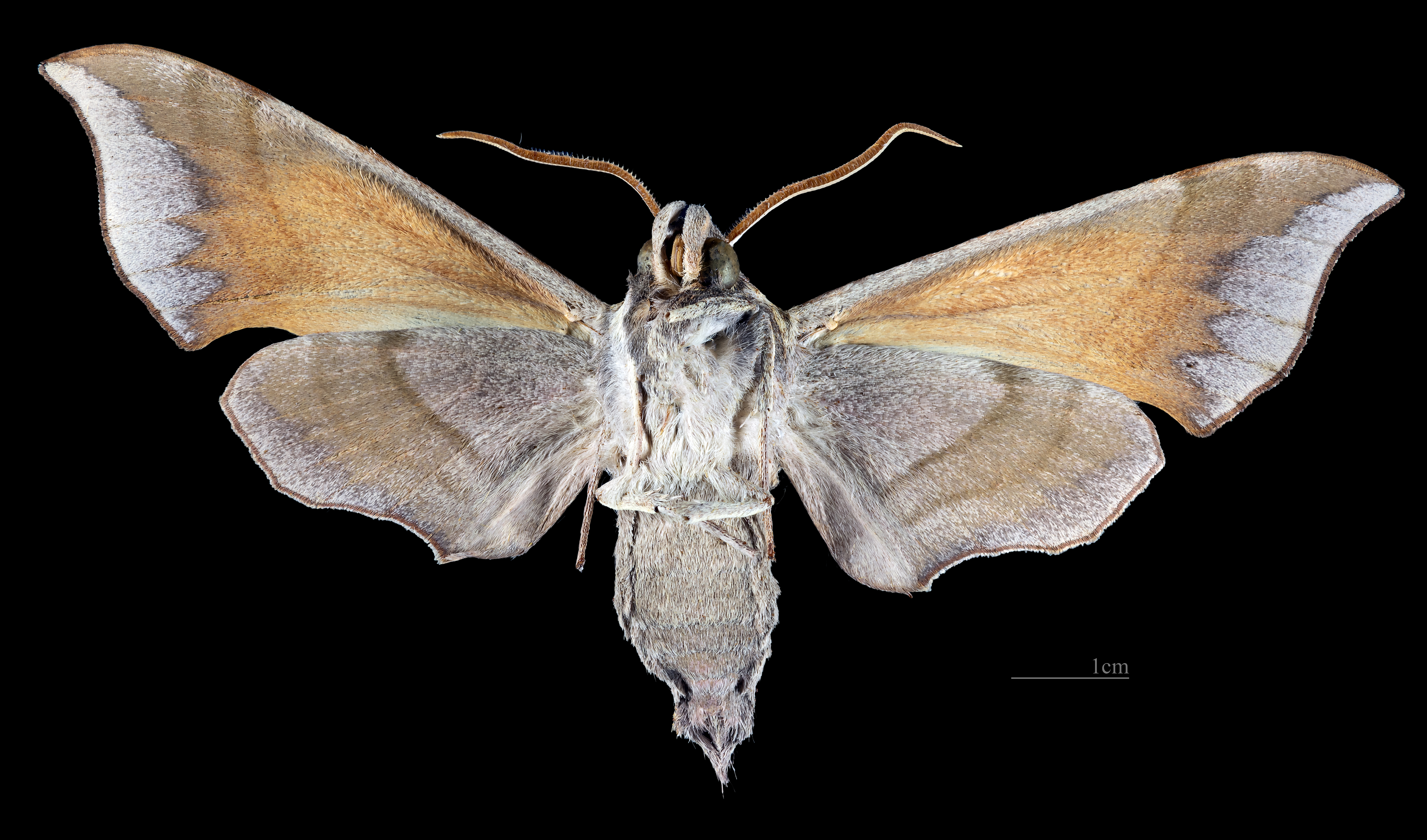
Male ventral

Adults are usually large with long abdomens ending in a point. The top of the forewing is striped with shades of green to brown and has a dark dot in the middle. The top of the hindwing is orange. Their wings span 2-3 inches.

Known as "hornworms", due to the large blue horn on the posterior end, the young larvae are slim and yellow. Maturing they become darker (green, pink or brown) and gain 7 pairs of diagonal stripes merging into a dorsal black line.

== Biology ==
There are five or more annual broods, and larvae can mature in as few as three weeks. Larvae hide on the midribs of their host leaves and are nocturnal feeders.

While active from early May to early September it's during June and July that this species is most active and abundant in many areas, particularly Massachusetts and Pennsylvania. Adults emerge in the mid-afternoon and females begin calling bob after dusk. In spring, adults are more likely to feed, nectaring from flowers and drinking fluids from rotting fruit. In areas where they are common, D. myron readily come to both lights and sugar baits, being most active between sunset and midnight.

Females have much rounder abdomens while the end of the male's abdomen is spade-shaped. Pairing is fairly quick and captive adults do not need to be fed, although females lay more eggs when fed. Sometimes adults refuse food altogether. Mated females deposit up to 150 small eggs that start out green but turn yellow within 48 hours, indicating fertility. Incubation lasts about six days.

Full grown caterpillars pose the ability to chew though sleeves. Fully grown larvae turn a purplish brown before spinning a sparse, wiry cocoon among leaves on the ground. Pupae either enclose within about 20 days or diapause, eclosing in late May.

The larvae are known to feed on Virginia creeper, Viburnums, grape vines, and raccoon grapes.

== Predators ==
Caterpillars are frequently parasitised by wasps, which lay their eggs directly on them.

== Subspecies ==
- Darapsa myron myron
- Darapsa myron mexicana (Gehlen, 1933) (Mexico)

== Gallery ==
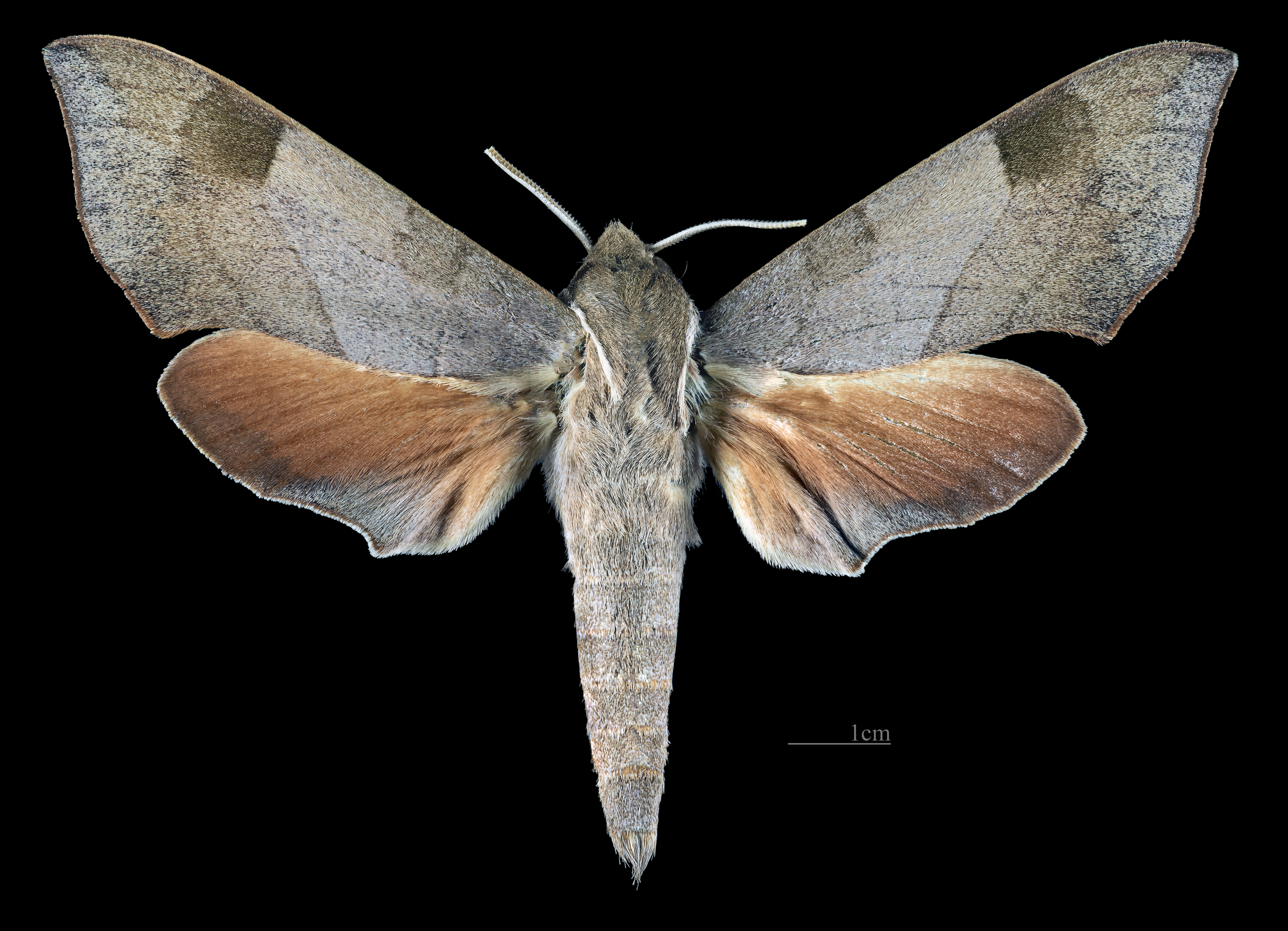
Darapsa myron mexicana dorsal female

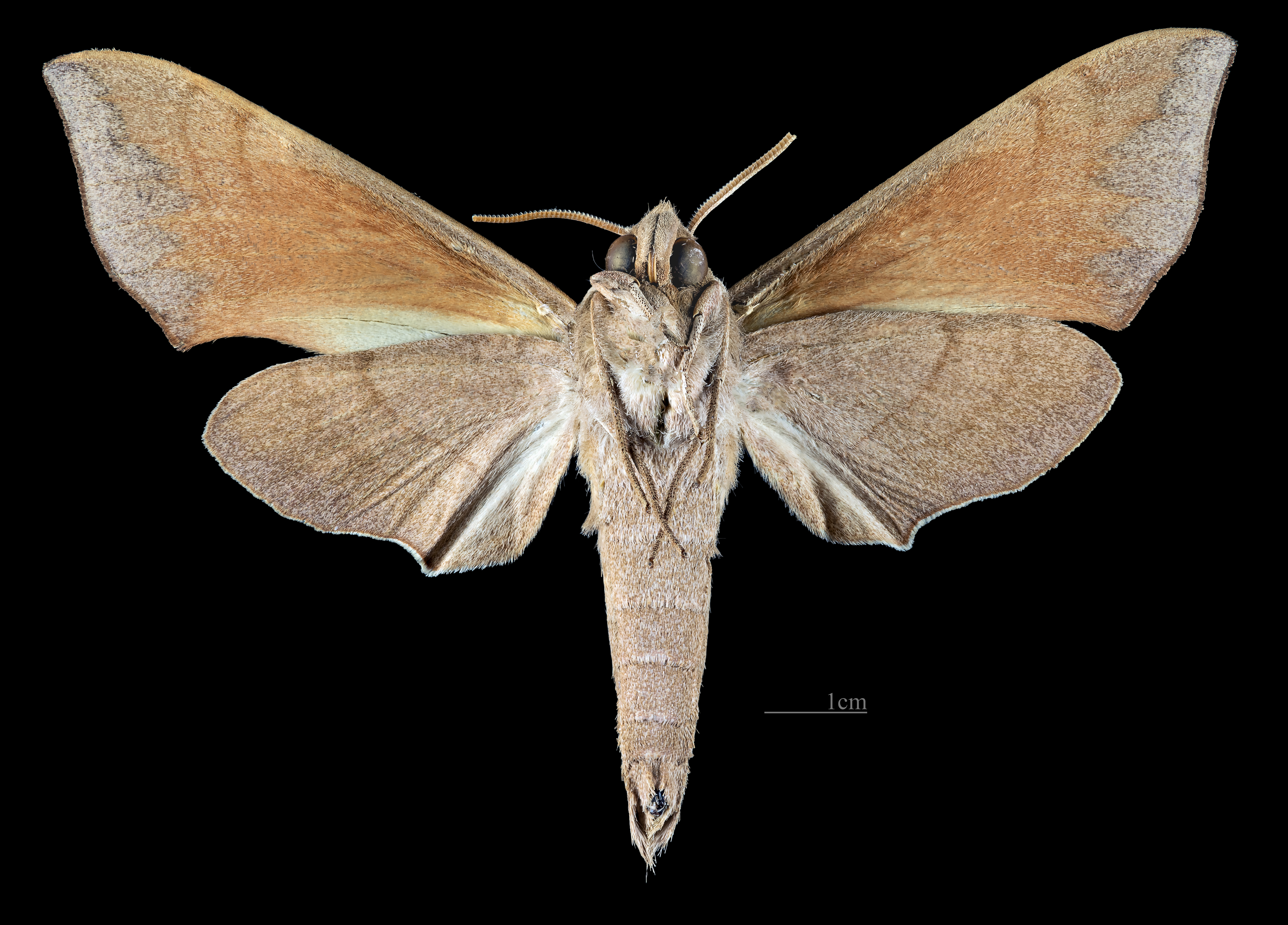
Darapsa myron mexicana ventral female
