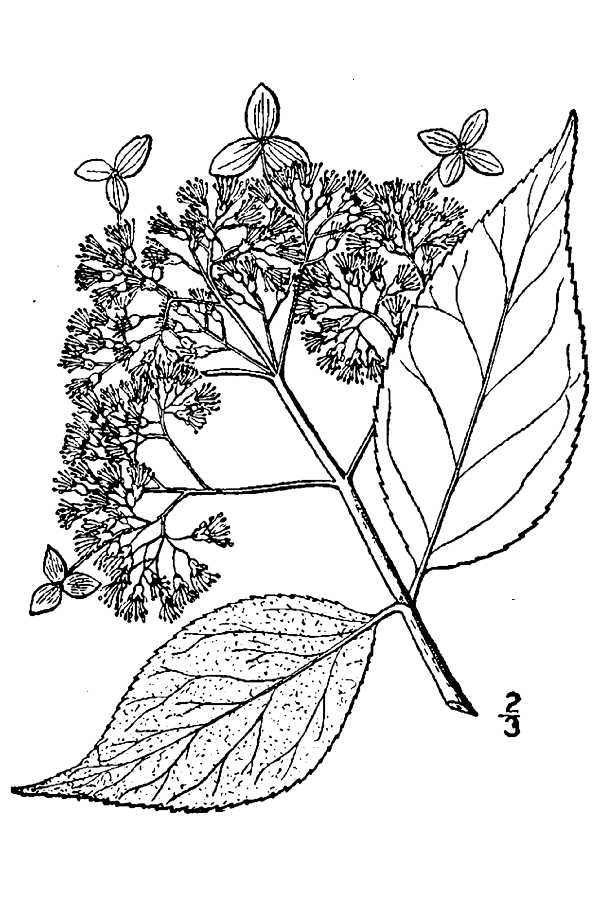

Scientific classification
- Kingdom: Plantae
- Clade: Tracheophytes
- Clade: Angiosperms
- Clade: Eudicots
- Clade: Asterids
- Order: Cornales
- Family: Hydrangeaceae
- Genus: Hydrangea
- Species: H. cinerea

Binomial name
- Hydrangea cinerea Small

Synonyms
- Hydrangea arborescens L. ssp. discolor (Walter) E.M. McClintock

= Hydrangea cinerea =

Ashy hydrangea

Species of flowering plant

Hydrangea cinerea, the ashy hydrangea or gray hydrangea, is a small to medium sized, deciduous shrub up to 3 m (9.8 ft) tall; its natural range is interior regions of the southeastern United States. Its common names reflect the ashy or gray appearance of the undersides of its leaves, which results from a dense pubescence.

== Range and habitat ==
Ashy hydrangea occurs scattered in mostly upland sites and rocky outcrops in the interior regions of the southeastern United States in the southern sections of the Blue Ridge Mountains from Tennessee to South Carolina, west to Missouri, south to Arkansas, Alabama, and Georgia. It is typically found in neutral, basic or calcareous soils.

== Taxonomy ==
Ashy hydrangea is similar to the more widespread smooth hydrangea (Hydrangea arborescens) and the restricted silverleaf hydrangea (Hydrangea radiata). At one time both ashy hydrangea and silverleaf hydrangea were considered subspecies of smooth hydrangea. However, most taxonomist now consider them to be separate species, and that usage is adopted here.

== Description ==
The inflorescence of ashy hydrangea is a corymb. The showy, sterile flowers (white to near white) are few (0–3 per flowerhead) and are borne around the periphery of the corymb; they are usually greater than 1 cm (0.39 in) in diameter. Flowering occurs in late spring or early summer.

The leaves of ashy hydrangea are large (8–15 cm (3.1–5.9 in) long), opposite, serrated, ovate, and deciduous. Lower leaf surfaces are variously pubescent, appearing gray; the trichomes are usually not dense enough to entirely mask the green leaf surface; as seen under magnification, the trichomes have prominent tubercles (bumps).

== Uses ==
This attractive native shrub is often cultivated for ornamental use. Ashy hydrangea is more tolerant of heat and drought than silverleaf hydrangea (Hydrangea radiata). Several popular cultivars ('Frosty', 'Pink Pin Cushion', and 'Sterilis') are available that have a greater component of showy, sterile flowers.

The plant is used medicinally by the Cherokee. An infusion of the bark scrapings is taken for vomiting bile, and an infusion of the roots is taken as a cathartic and emetic by women during menses.

Ashy hydrangea was probably used medicinally in a similar manner as smooth hydrangea by the Cherokee Indians, and later, by early settlers for treatment of kidney and bladder stones.
