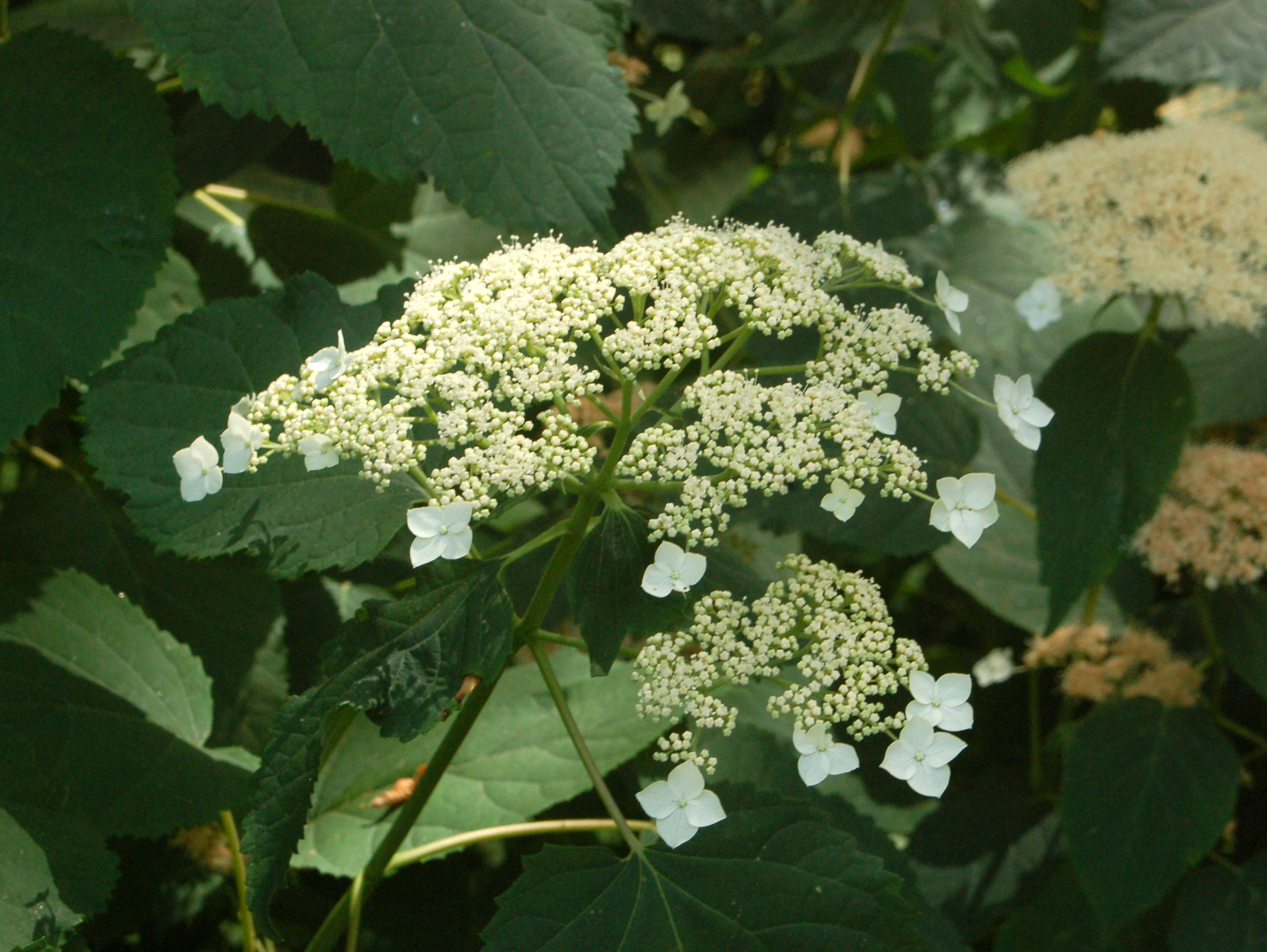
- Inflorescence of Hydrangea radiata at the park of Villa Serra, Genova, Italy

Scientific classification
- Kingdom: Plantae
- Clade: Tracheophytes
- Clade: Angiosperms
- Clade: Eudicots
- Clade: Asterids
- Order: Cornales
- Family: Hydrangeaceae
- Genus: Hydrangea
- Species: H. radiata

Binomial name
- Hydrangea radiata Walter

Synonyms
- Hydrangea arborescens L. ssp. radiata (Walter) E.M. McClintock

= Hydrangea radiata =

Silverleaf hydrangea

Species of flowering plant

Hydrangea radiata is a deciduous shrub up to 3 m (9.8 ft) tall in the flowering plant family Hydrangeaceae. Its natural range is limited to the southern Appalachians, where it is fairly common. Its common names—silverleaf hydrangea or snowy hydrangea—reflect its distinctive foliage which is dark green on top and silvery white below; the sharply contrasting foliar colors makes this shrub conspicuous at a distance, especially in a breeze.

== Range and habitat ==
Silver hydrangea is native to the mountainous region, usually above 2,000 feet (610 m) elevation, represented by the southern Blue Ridge Mountains from southeast Tennessee, east to North Carolina and northwestern South Carolina, and south to northeastern Georgia. It typically occurs near streams, rocky outcrops, and along roads, especially in the headwaters of the Chattooga River and also in the French Broad River Valley. It is conspicuous along roadsides near the junction of North Carolina, South Carolina, and Georgia—in the vicinity of Highlands, Cashiers, and Rosman, North Carolina. Some outlier occurrences of silverleaf hydrangea have been locally observed in the Piedmont Region; these populations may have escaped from cultivation.

== Taxonomy ==
Silverleaf hydrangea is similar to the more widespread smooth hydrangea (Hydrangea arborescens) and ashy hydrangea (Hydrangea cinerea). At one time both silverleaf hydrangea and ashy hydrangea were considered subspecies of smooth hydrangea. However, most taxonomists now consider them to be separate species, and that usage is adopted here. Evidence for separating these three closely related, native hydrangeas is based largely on cross-pollination experiments conducted by Ronald Pilatowski. The crosses yielded few viable seeds at best, indicating that despite overlapping ranges and characteristics, the plants maintained their genetic purity and their unique phenotypic characteristics.

== Characteristics ==
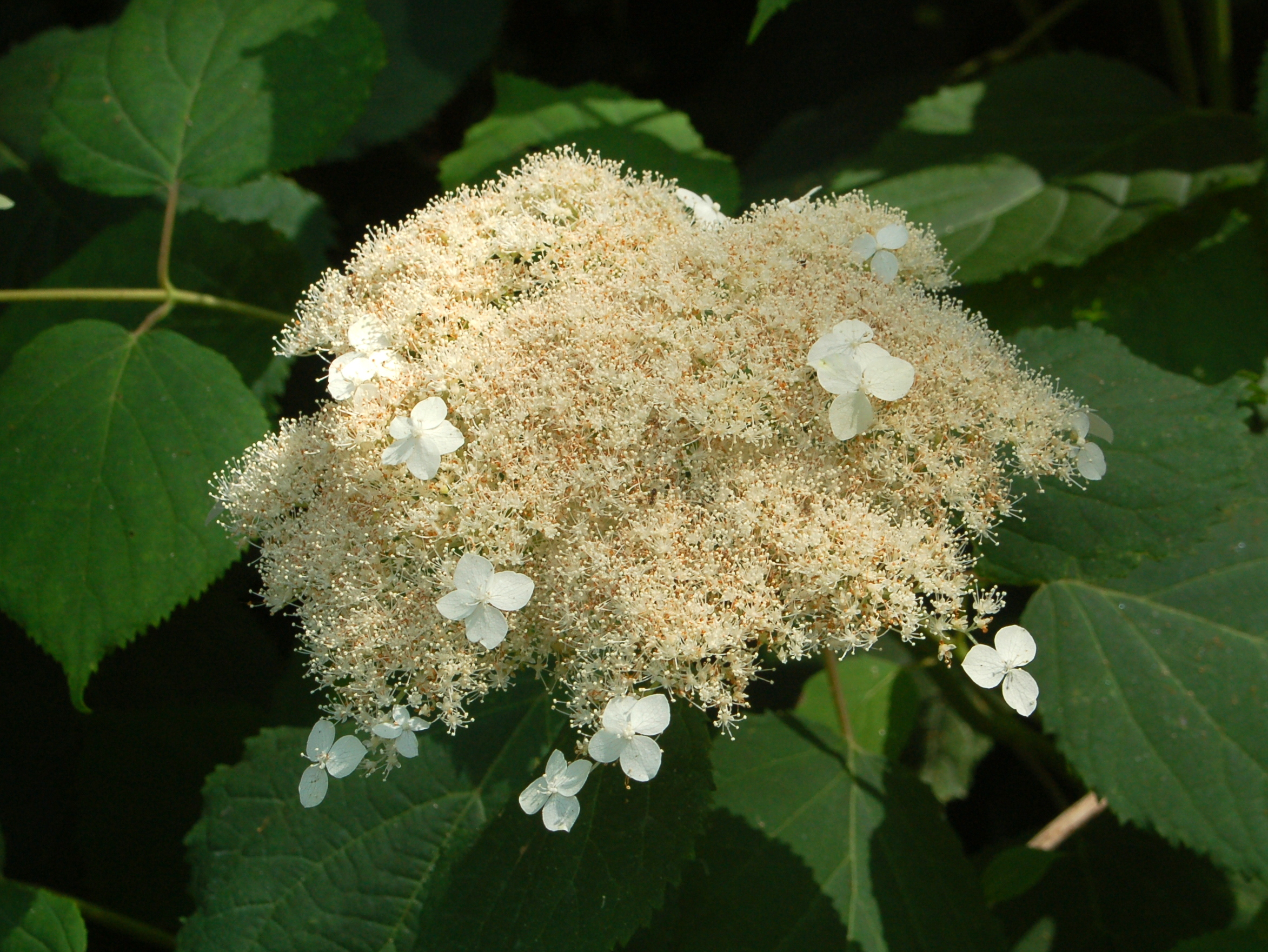
Inflorescence of Hydrangea radiata

The inflorescence of silver hydrangea is a corymb. The showy, sterile flowers (white to near white) and are comparatively abundant (2–15 per bloom) and are borne around the periphery of the corymb; they are usually greater than 1 cm in diameter.

The leaves of silverleaf hydrangea are 8 to 15 cm (3 to 6 in) long, opposite, serrated, ovate, and deciduous. The upper leaf surface has hairs along the veins. The lower leaf surface is densely covered with felt-like hairs, appearing bright white or silver; when viewed under magnification, these hairs are without tubercles (ashy hydrangea has numerous tubercles). These hairs are so thick that the lower surface of the leaf's epidermis cannot be seen.

== Uses ==
This attractive shrub has considerable landscaping potential in areas with a suitable climate and soils. Requiring cool, moist habitats in the shade, silverleaf hydrangea is not as tolerant of the heat and drought as smooth hydrangea. It is also more difficult to root from cuttings than either smooth or ashy hydrangeas. Silverleaf hydrangea produces more showy flowers than smooth hydrangea or ashy hydrangea. Silverleaf hydrangea is suitable for hardiness zones 4 to 9, although highly protected locations would be advisable in areas warmer than zone 6. Several popular cultivars are available (Samantha and Terri Greer).
