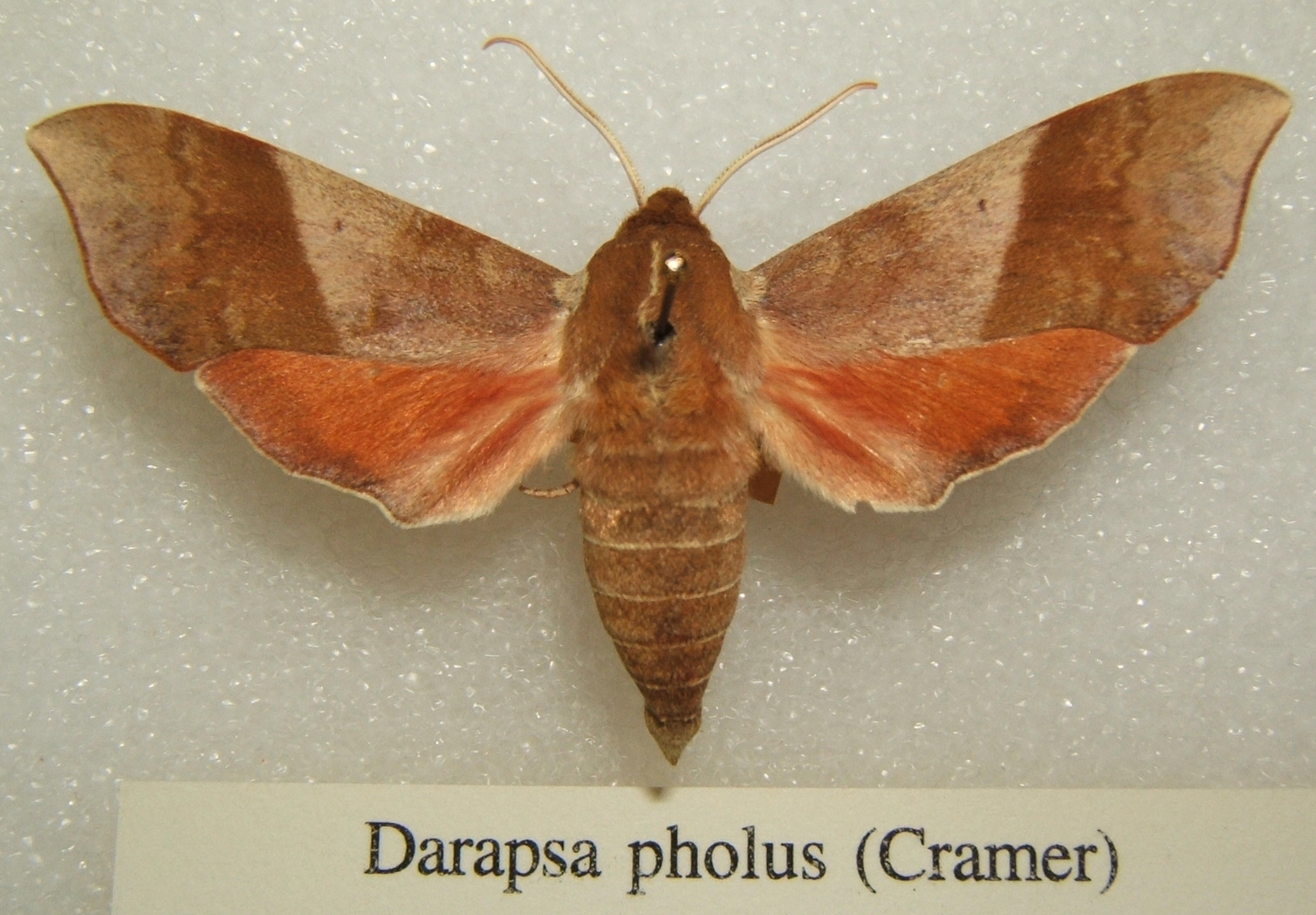

Scientific classification
- Domain: Eukaryota
- Kingdom: Animalia
- Phylum: Arthropoda
- Class: Insecta
- Order: Lepidoptera
- Family: Sphingidae
- Genus: Darapsa
- Species: D. choerilus

Binomial name
- Darapsa choerilus (Cramer, 1779)

Synonyms
- Darapsa pholus; Darapsa flavescens; Sphinx choerilus Cramer, 1779; Sphinx pholus Cramer, 1776; Sphinx azaleae Smith, 1797; Sphinx chlorinda Martyn, 1797; Darapsa pholus flavescens (Closs, 1911); Darapsa choerilus brodiei Clark, 1929

= Darapsa choerilus =

Azalea sphinx

Species of moth

Darapsa choerilus, the azalea sphinx, is a moth of the family Sphingidae first described by Pieter Cramer in 1779. It is found in the United States and southern Canada east of the Rocky Mountains.

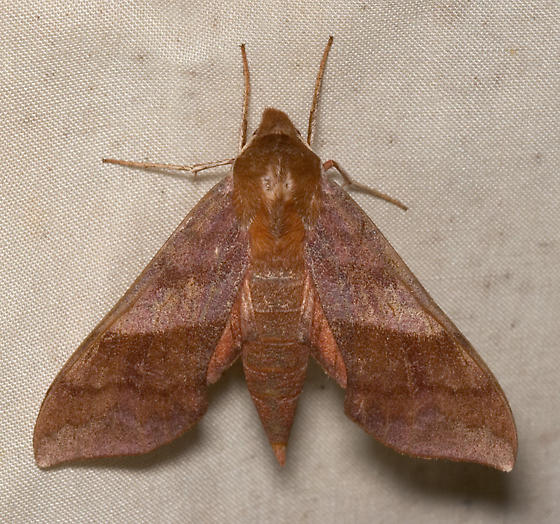

The wingspan is 57–75 mm.

The larvae feed on azalea and Viburnum species.
