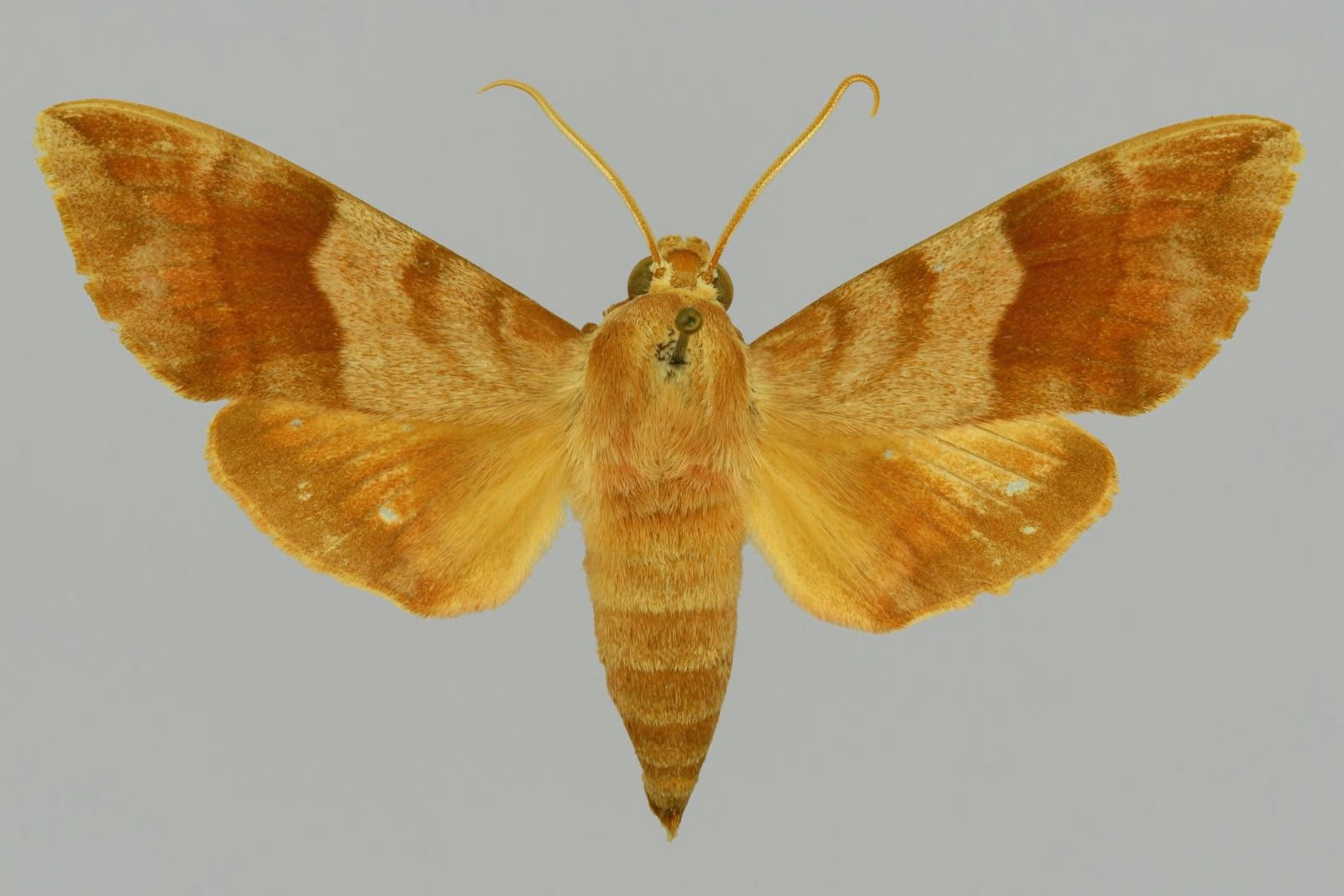
- Male

Scientific classification
- Kingdom: Animalia
- Phylum: Arthropoda
- Class: Insecta
- Order: Lepidoptera
- Family: Sphingidae
- Genus: Clarina
- Species: C. kotschyi

Binomial name
- Clarina kotschyi (Kollar, 1849)

Synonyms
- Deilephila kotschyi Kollar, 1849; Metopsilus mardina Staudinger, 1901

= Clarina kotschyi =

Grapevine hawkmoth

Species of moth

Clarina kotschyi, the grapevine hawkmoth, is a moth of the family Sphingidae. The species was first described by Vincenz Kollar in 1849. It is found from the Iranian plateau and Mesopotamia to eastern and central Turkey.

The larvae have been recorded feeding on Vitis vinifera, Parthenocissus and Ampelopsis species.
