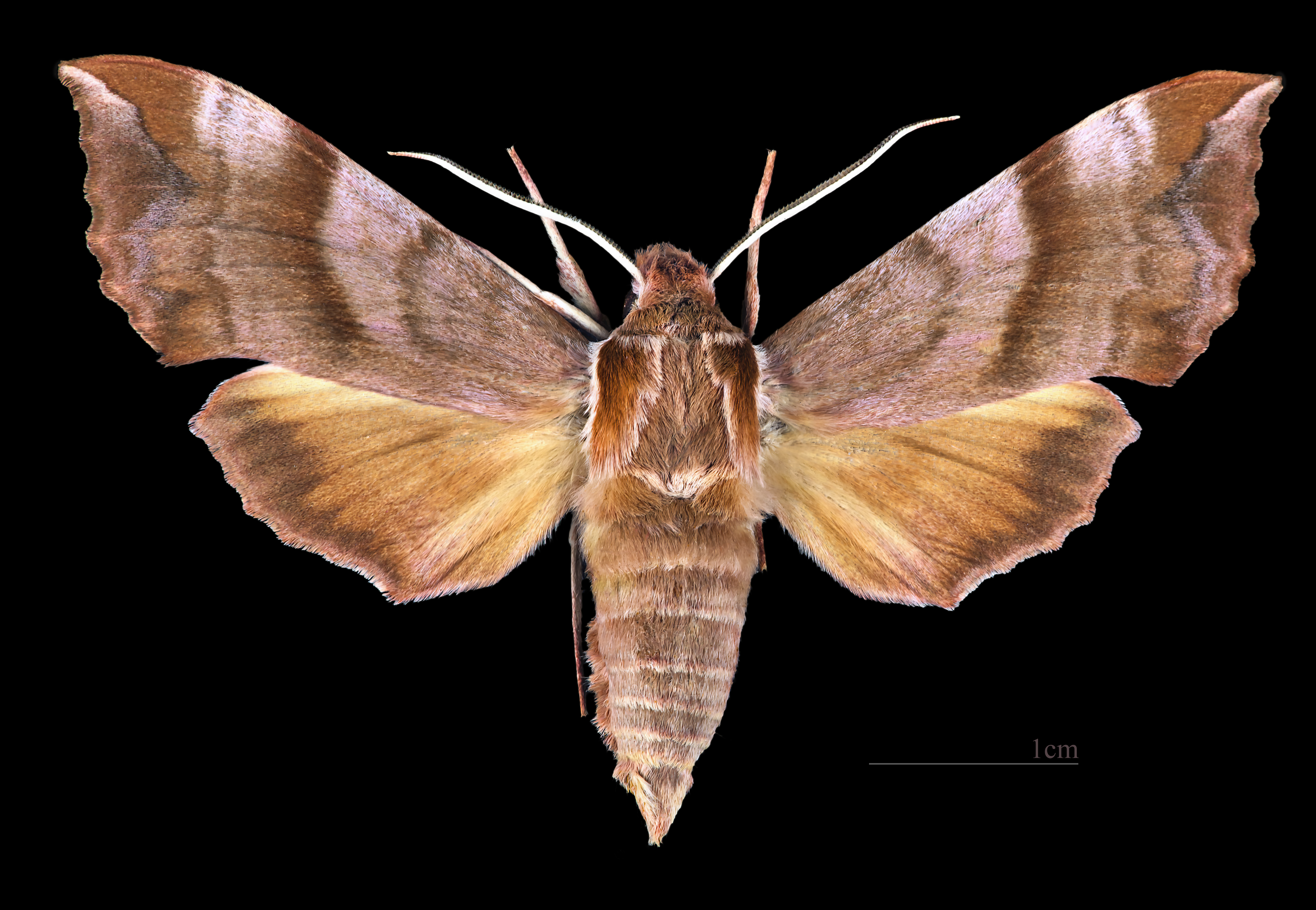
- Clarina syriaca

Scientific classification
- Kingdom: Animalia
- Phylum: Arthropoda
- Class: Insecta
- Order: Lepidoptera
- Family: Sphingidae
- Subtribe: Macroglossina
- Genus: Clarina; Tutt, 1903

Synonyms
- Berutana Rothschild & Jordan, 1903

= Clarina (moth) =

Genus of moths

Clarina is a genus of moths in the family Sphingidae first described by J. W. Tutt in 1903.

== Species ==
- Clarina kotschyi (Kollar, 1849)
- Clarina syriaca (Lederer, 1855)
