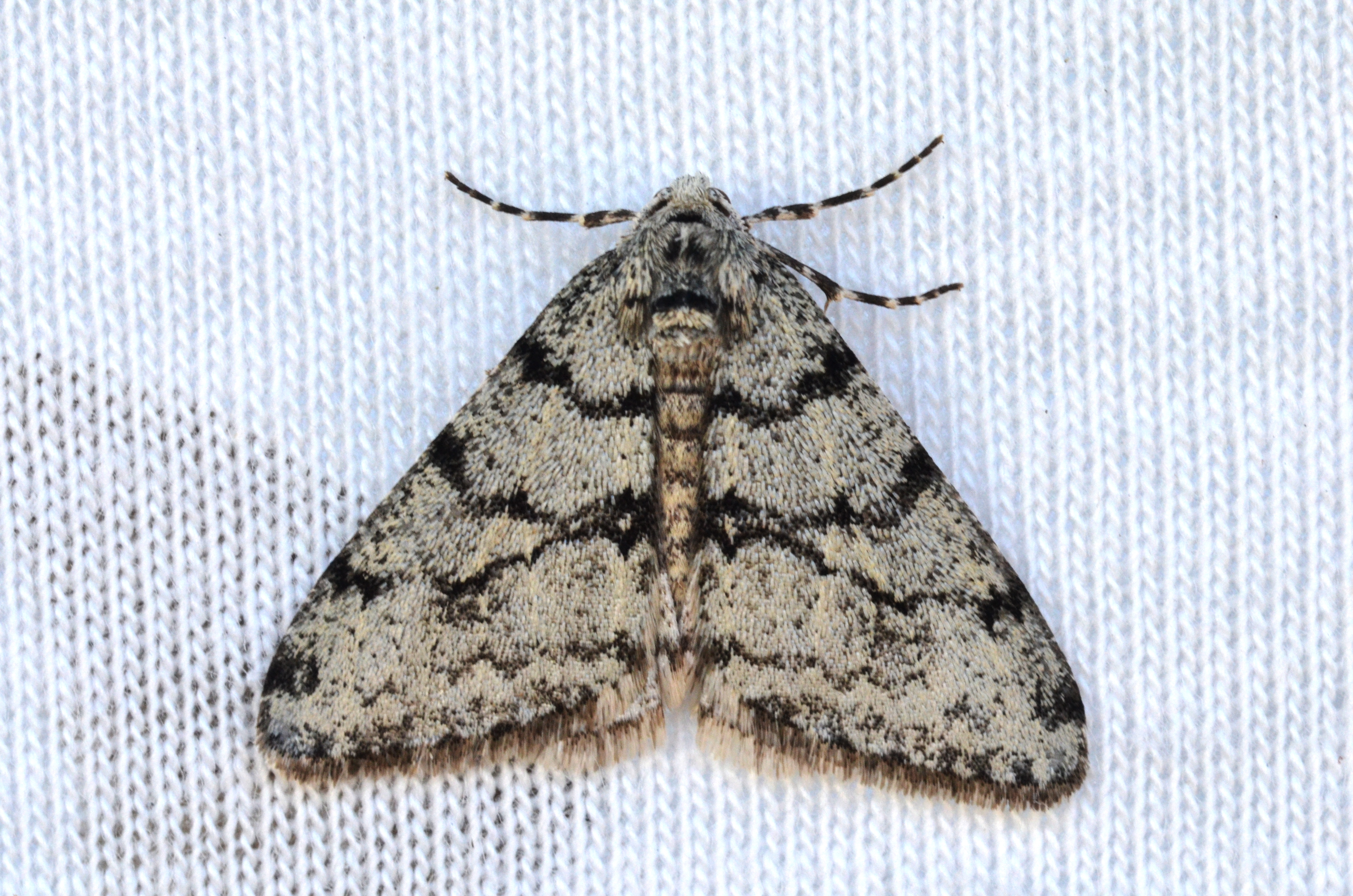

Scientific classification
- Domain: Eukaryota
- Kingdom: Animalia
- Phylum: Arthropoda
- Class: Insecta
- Order: Lepidoptera
- Family: Geometridae
- Genus: Apocheima
- Species: A. strigataria

Binomial name
- Apocheima strigataria (Minot, 1869)

Synonyms
- Anisopteryx strigataria Minot, 1869; Phigalia strigataria; Hybernia olivacearia Morrison, 1874

= Apocheima strigataria =

Species of moth

Apocheima strigataria, the small phigalia moth, is a moth of the family Geometridae. The species was first described by Charles Sedgwick Minot in 1869. It is found in North America, where it has been recorded from North Dakota to Texas and further east. The habitat consists of woodlands and forests.

The length of the forewings is 14–18 mm for males. Females are flightless with reduced wings. Adults are on wing from January onwards in the south. In the north, adults are on wing from March to May.

The larvae feed on Juglans nigra, Carya ovata, Carya tomentosa, Carya glabra, Betula lenta, Corylus americana, Quercus alba, Quercus prinus, Quercus stellata, Quercus rubra, Quercus coccinea, Quercus velutina, Ulmus rubra, Celtis occidentalis, Hamamelis virginiana, Crataegus, Amelanchier canadensis, Amelanchier grandiflora, Malus sylvestris, Malus coronaria, Rubus, Prunus serotina, Cercis canadensis, Acer negundo, Acer saccharum, Acer rubrum, Acer pensylvaticum, Tilia americana, Parthenocissus quinquefolia, Nyssa sylvatica, Cornus florida and Vaccinium angustifolium.
