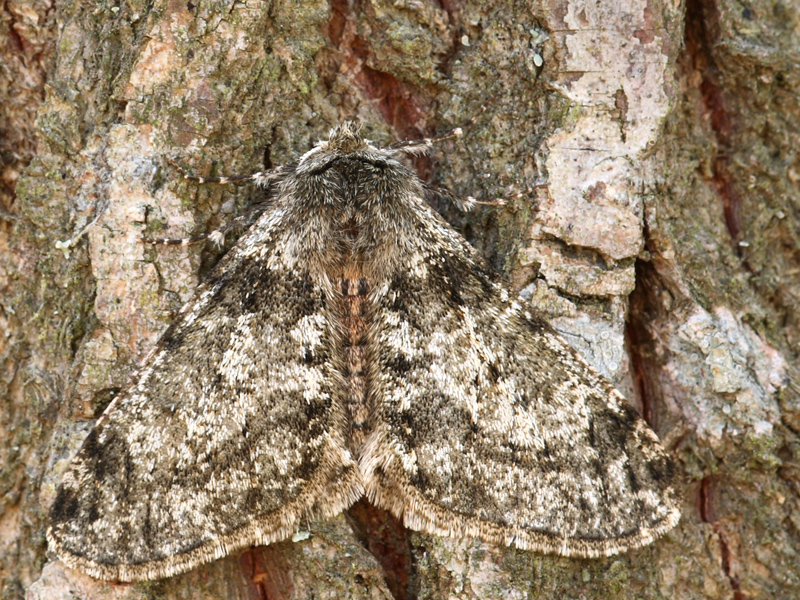

Scientific classification
- Domain: Eukaryota
- Kingdom: Animalia
- Phylum: Arthropoda
- Class: Insecta
- Order: Lepidoptera
- Family: Geometridae
- Genus: Phigalia
- Species: P. pilosaria

Binomial name
- Phigalia pilosaria (Denis & Schiffermüller, 1775)

Synonyms
- Geometra pilosaria Denis & Schiffermüller, 1775; Apocheima pilosaria (Denis & Schiffermüller, 1775); Phigalia pedaria (Fabricius, 1787)

= Phigalia pilosaria =

Species of moth

Phigalia pilosaria, the pale brindled beauty, is a moth of the family Geometridae. The species was first described by Michael Denis and Ignaz Schiffermüller in 1775. It is found from Europe and Anatolia to the Caucasus.

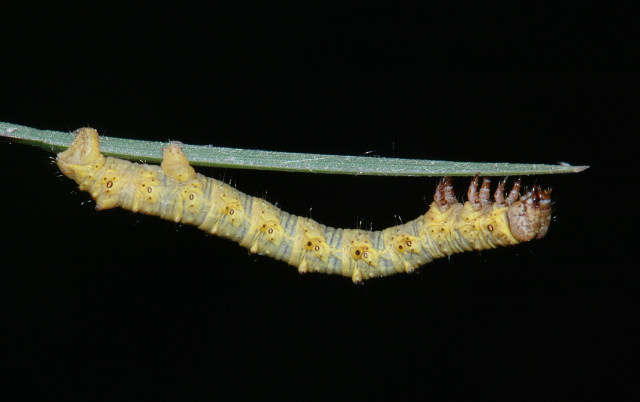
Larva

The wingspan is 35–40 mm for males. Females are wingless. The male is grey with a more or less strong olivaceous tinge, sometimes mixed with some ochreous or with some whitish scales. The lines are variable, thickened and darkened at the margins. The female is stouter than that of E. defoliaria, with a longer ovipositor and dorsally more or less brownish, abdomen spinose. — ab. extinctaria Stndf. is a paler, almost unicolorous form of the male - ab. monacharia Stgr. is unicolorous blackish or even quite black. Chiefly from Yorkshire. The larva is brown mottled with ferruginous, frequently with V-shaped ochreous dorsal marks on the 2nd and 3rd abdominal segments.

Adults are on wing from January to April. There is one generation per year.

The larva feeds on various deciduous trees, including Quercus species.
