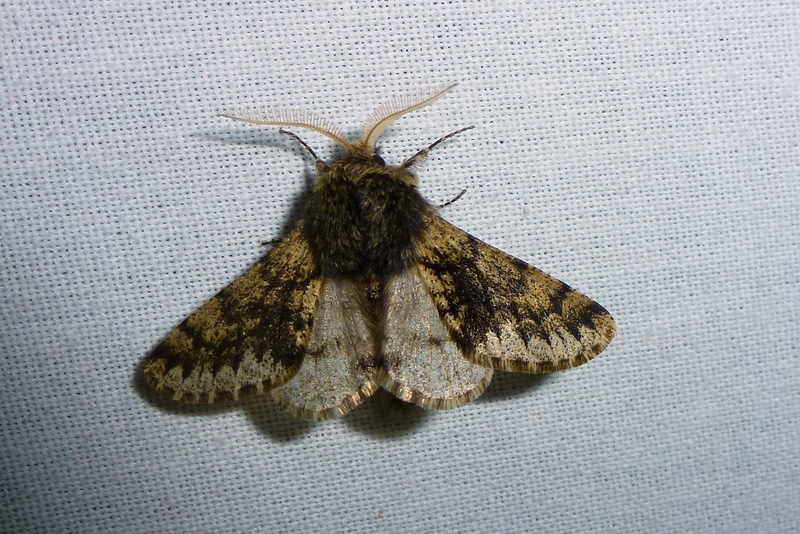

Scientific classification
- Kingdom: Animalia
- Phylum: Arthropoda
- Clade: Pancrustacea
- Class: Insecta
- Order: Lepidoptera
- Family: Geometridae
- Genus: Apocheima
- Species: A. hispidaria

Binomial name
- Apocheima hispidaria (Denis & Schiffermüller, 1775)

Synonyms
- Geometra hispidaria Denis & Schiffermüller, 1775

= Apocheima hispidaria =

Species of moth

Apocheima hispidaria, the small brindled beauty, is a moth of the family Geometridae. The species was first described by Michael Denis and Ignaz Schiffermüller in 1775. It is found from Spain through central Europe to Russia. In the north, the range extends to southern Sweden. In the south, it is found on all of the Balkan Peninsula (except Greece) up to the Black Sea.

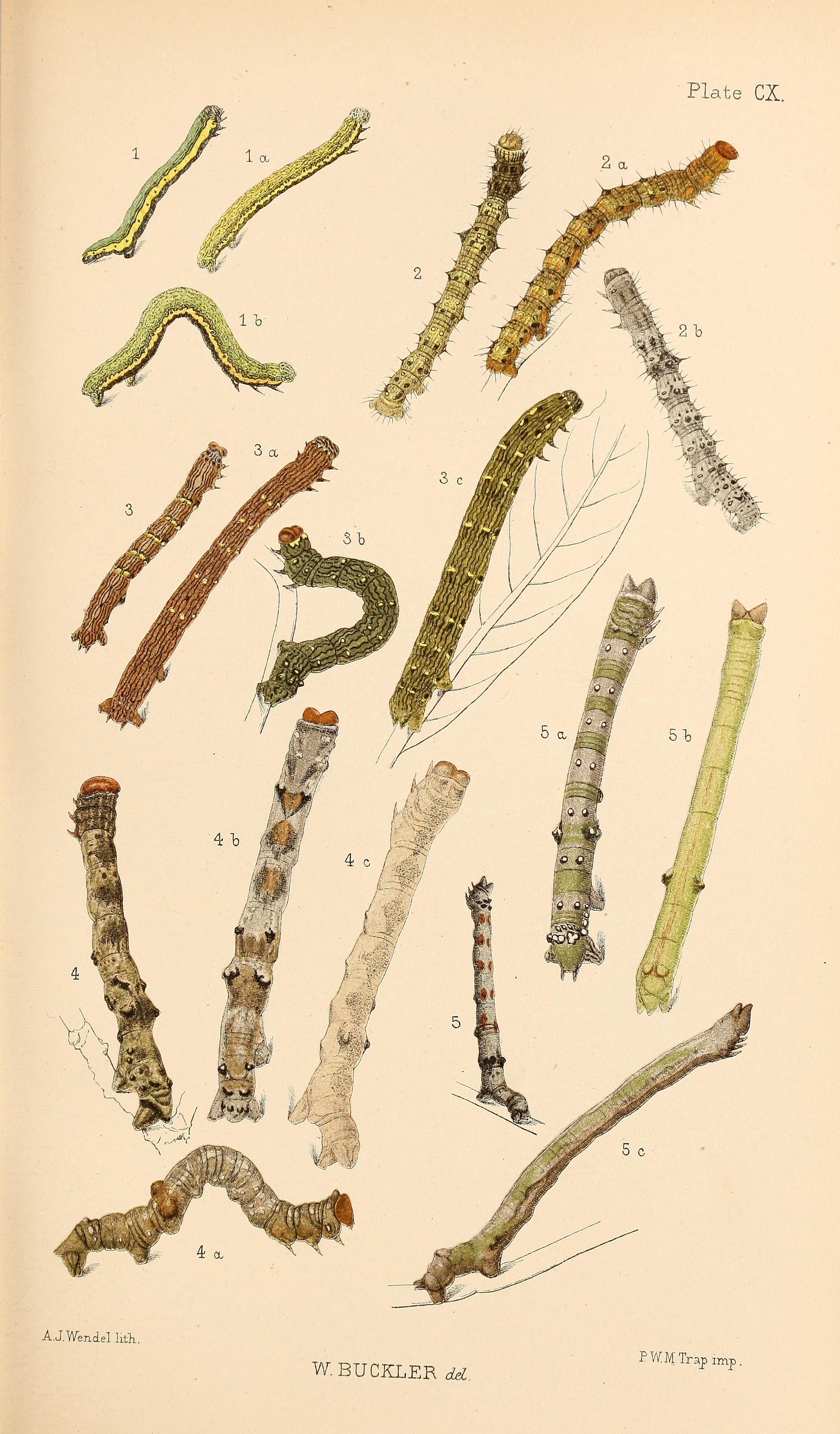
Fig 2, 2a, 2b Larva after final moult

The wingspan is 28–35 mm. Adults are on wing from mid-March to mid-May.

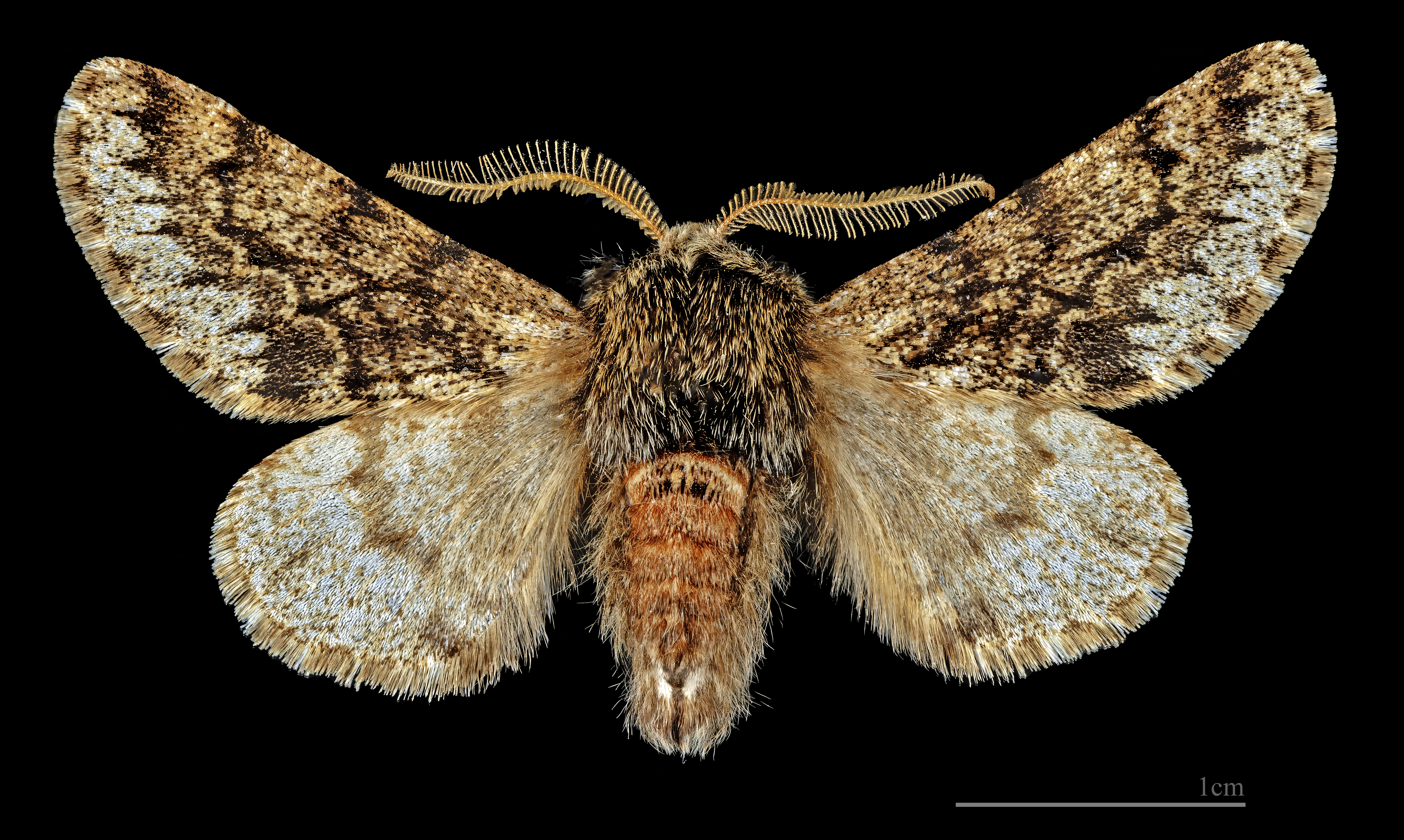
Apocheima hispidaria hispidaria ♂

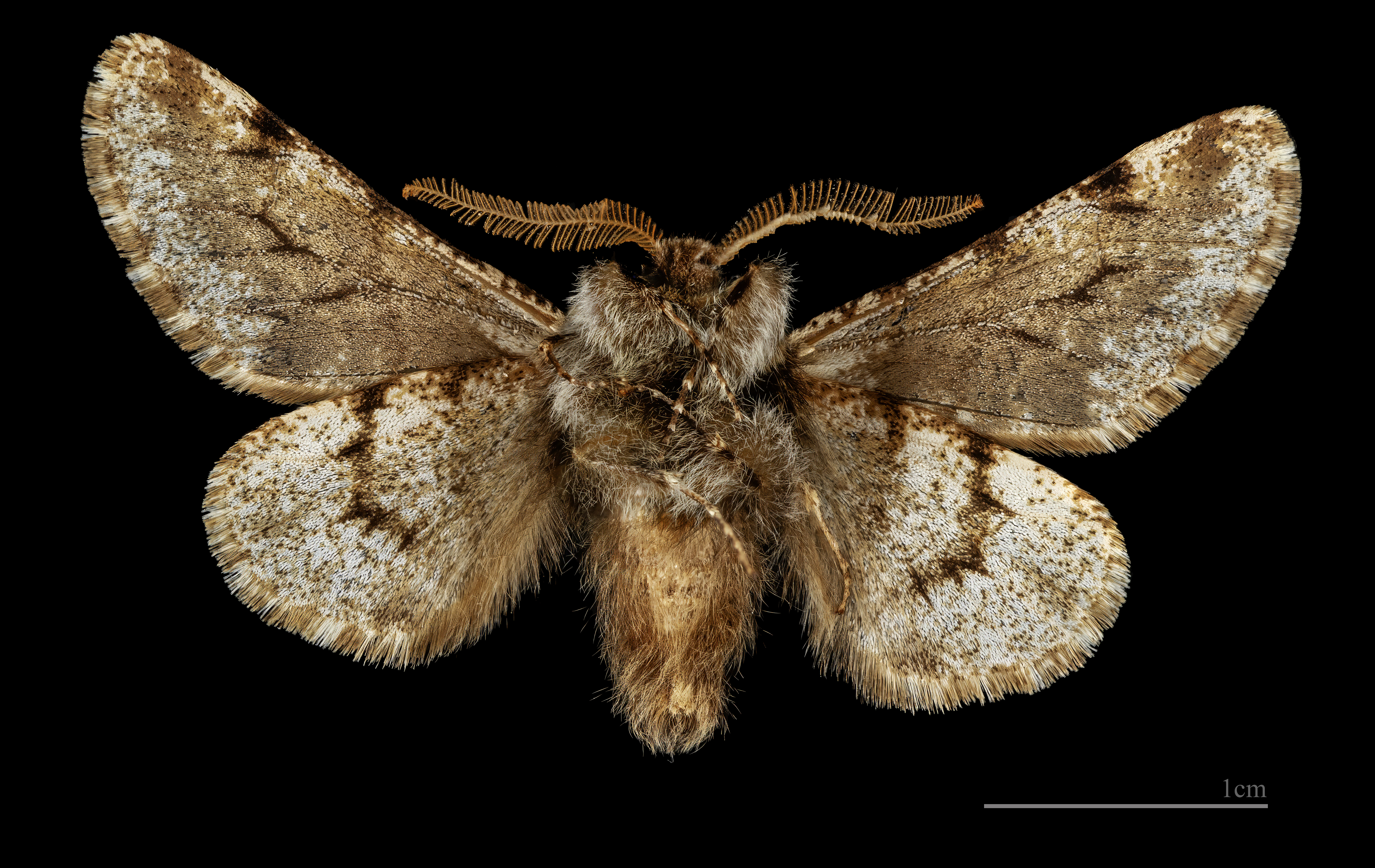
Apocheima hispidaria hispidaria ♂ △

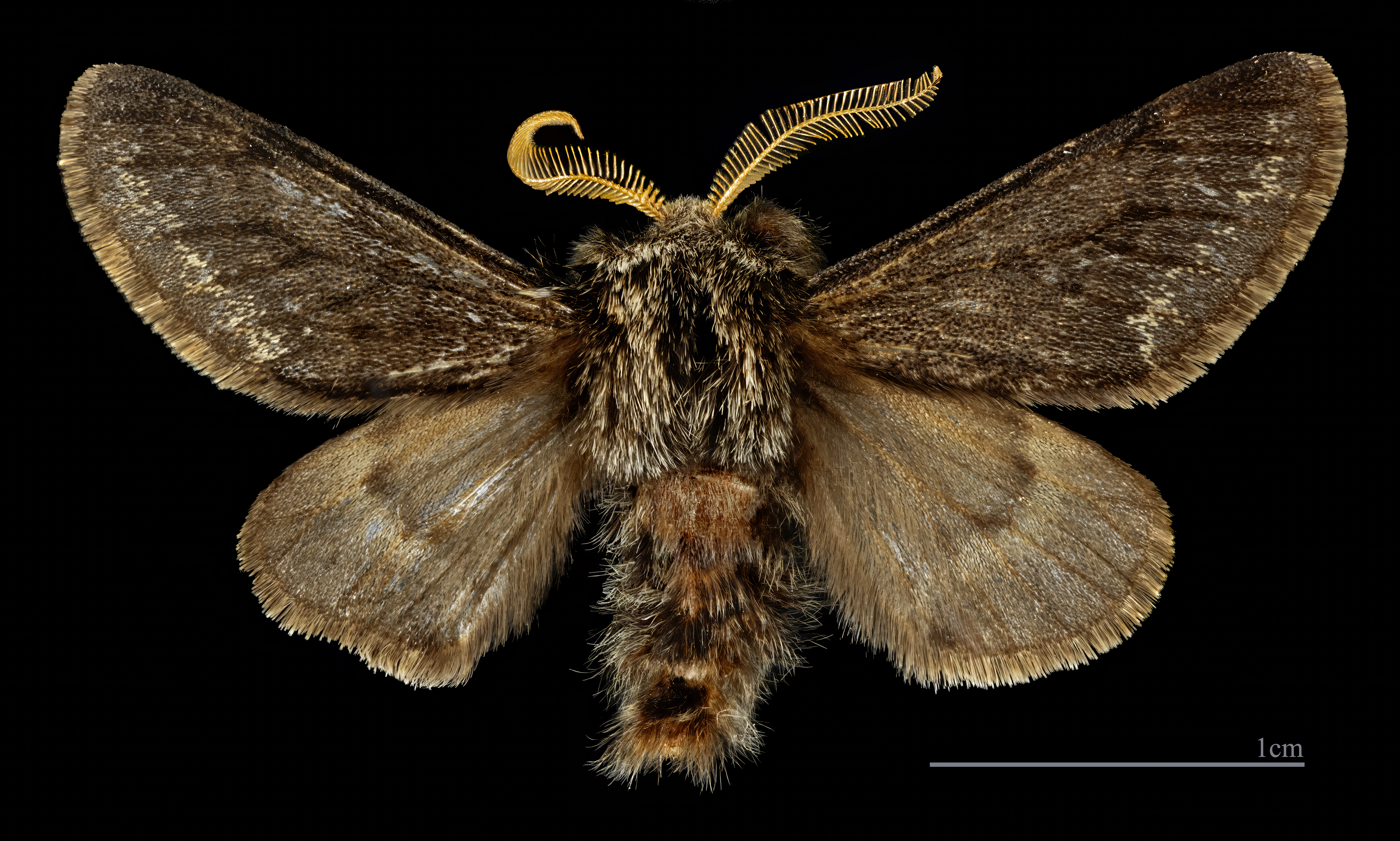
Apocheima hispidaria f. Obscura ♂

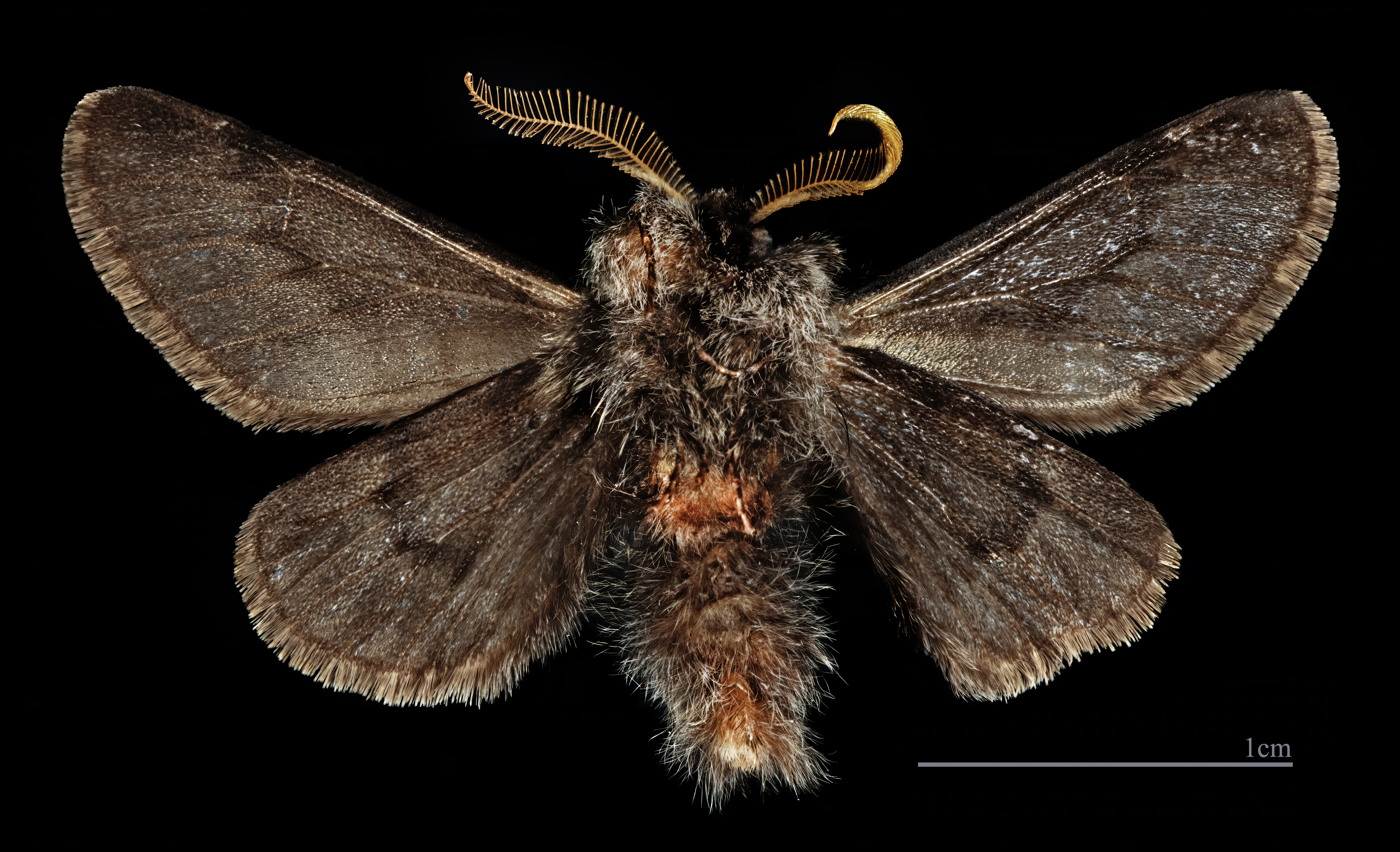
Apocheima hispidaria f. Obscura ♂ △

The larvae feed on Quercus robur, Salix aurita, Carpinus betulus, Prunus spinosa, Prunus avium and Malus domestica. Larvae can be found from May to July.

== Subspecies ==
- Apocheima hispidaria hispidaria
- Apocheima hispidaria cottei (Oberthür, 1913)
- Apocheima hispidaria popovi Vojnitz, 1972
- Apocheima hispidaria orientis (Wehrli, 1940)
