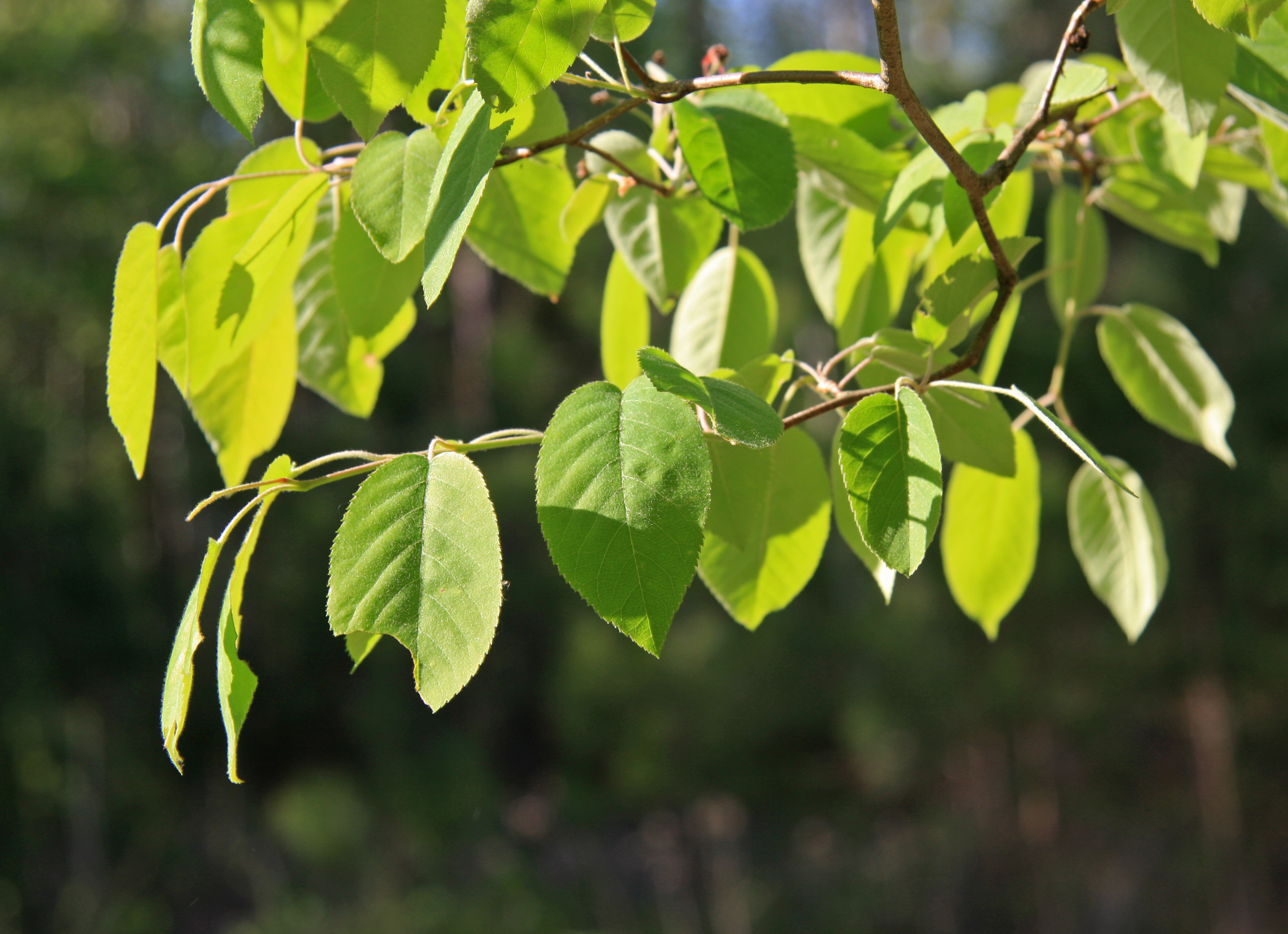

Conservation status
- Least Concern (IUCN 3.1)

- Secure (NatureServe)

Scientific classification
- Kingdom: Plantae
- Clade: Tracheophytes
- Clade: Angiosperms
- Clade: Eudicots
- Clade: Rosids
- Order: Rosales
- Family: Rosaceae
- Genus: Amelanchier
- Species: A. arborea

Binomial name
- Amelanchier arborea (F.Michx.) Fernald
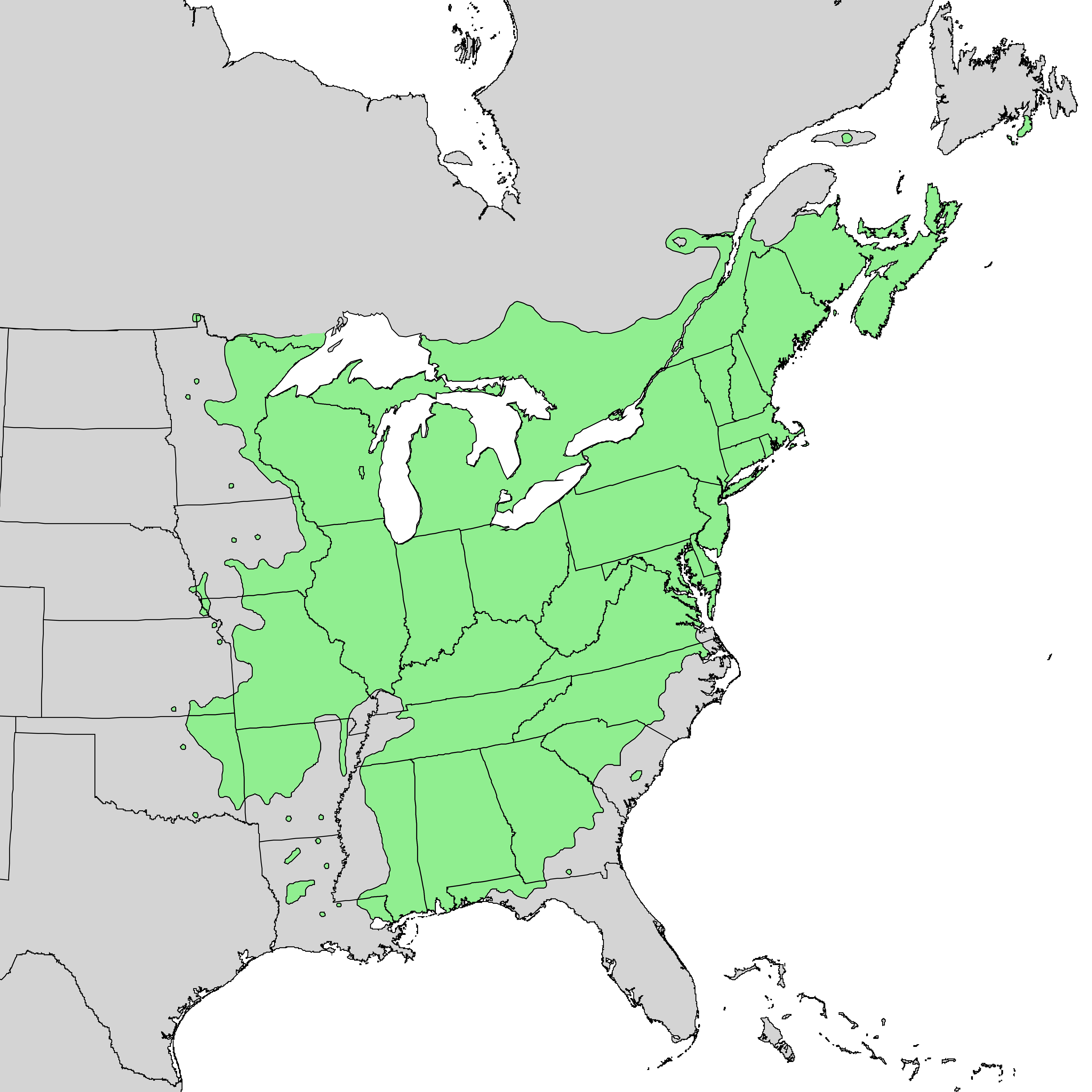
- Natural range of Amelanchier arborea

Synonyms
- Mespilus arborea F. Michx.

= Amelanchier arborea =

Species of tree

Amelanchier arborea (downy serviceberry or common serviceberry), is a small tree native to eastern North America from the Gulf Coast north to Thunder Bay in Ontario and Lake St. John in Quebec, and west to Texas and Minnesota.

Other common names are "shadberries" (as their blossoming coincides with the shad runs in New England), "Juneberries" (because the berries usually set on in June), and "Service" or "Sarvice" berries because their blooms mean that the muddy back roads into the "coves and hollers" of Appalachia will soon be passable for circuit-riding preachers and the communities will be able to have Sunday services again. (Some say, more morbidly, that it means the ground is soft enough to dig, which means that those who died over winter can be buried and have services said over them.)

== Description ==
Amelanchier arborea is generally 5–12 m (16–39 ft) tall. Occasionally, it can grow up to 20 metres (66 ft) tall and reach into the overstory. The trunk can be up to 15 cm (6 in) in diameter (rarely to 40 cm or 16 in). The bark is smooth and gray.

The buds are slender with a pointed tip, and usually more than two scales visible. The leaves are ovate or elliptical, 4–8 cm (1 1/2–3 1/4 in), rarely 10 cm (4 in), long and 2.5–4 cm (1–1 5/8 in) wide, with pointed tips and finely serrated margins. A characteristic useful for identification is that the young leaves emerge downy on the underside. The fall color is variable, from orange-yellow to pinkish or reddish.

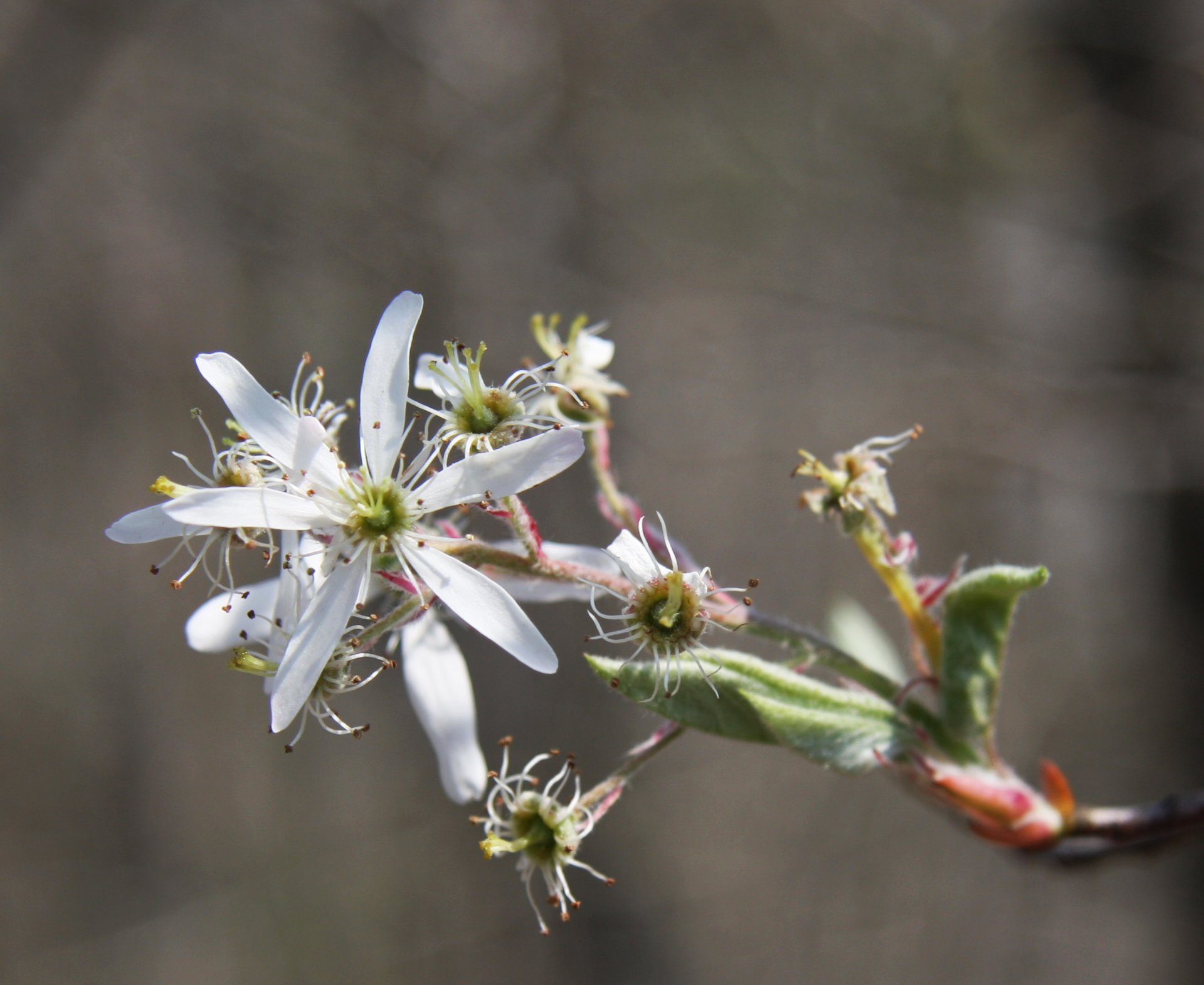
Flower details

It has perfect flowers that are 15–25 mm (5/8–1 in) in diameter, with 5 petals, emerging during budbreak in early spring. The petals are white. Flowers are produced on pendulous racemes 3–5 cm (1 1/4–2 in) long with 4–10 flowers on each raceme. The flowers are pollinated by bees. The fruit is a reddish-purple pome, resembling a small apple in shape. They ripen in summer and are very popular with birds. The fruit is eaten by over 40 species of birds and various mammals, including squirrels, rabbits, chipmunks, mice, voles, foxes, black bears, deer, and elk.

It also commonly hybridizes with other species of Amelanchier, the hybrid Amelanchier × grandiflora being one example, and identification can be very difficult as a result.

== Cultivation ==
This species tolerates varying light levels, but is at its best in full sun. It requires good drainage and air circulation and should be watered during drought. It is often confused with other species in the nursery trade. Propagation is by seed, divisions and grafting.

The edible fruit is drier than some other serviceberries, and it is harvested locally for pies and jams, and has been known to be used for wine; they were also used by Native Americans to make bread.

Some report that the sweetened juice tastes like Dr. Pepper and some nurseries sell them as "The Dr. Pepper Tree", but the fruit is not used in the soft drink.
