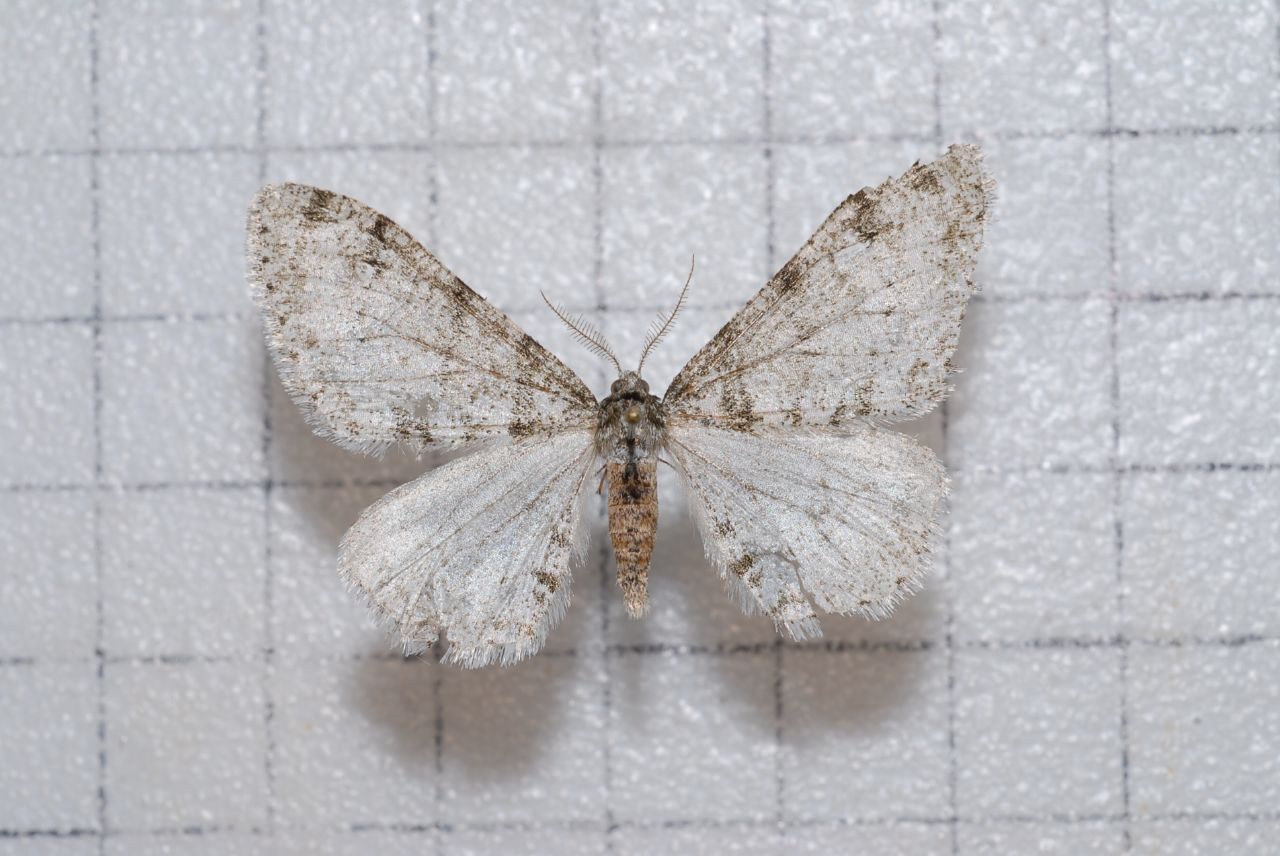

Scientific classification
- Kingdom: Animalia
- Phylum: Arthropoda
- Class: Insecta
- Order: Lepidoptera
- Family: Geometridae
- Genus: Phigalia
- Species: P. owadai

Binomial name
- Phigalia owadai Nakajima, 1994

Synonyms
- Apocheima owadai

= Phigalia owadai =

Species of moth

Phigalia owadai is a species of moth of the family Geometridae. It is found in Taiwan.
