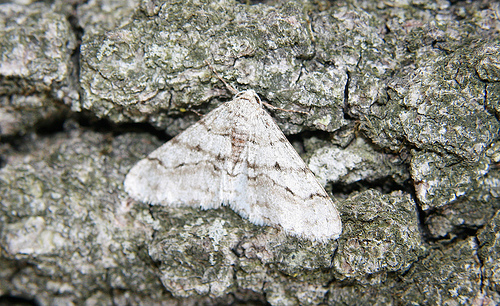

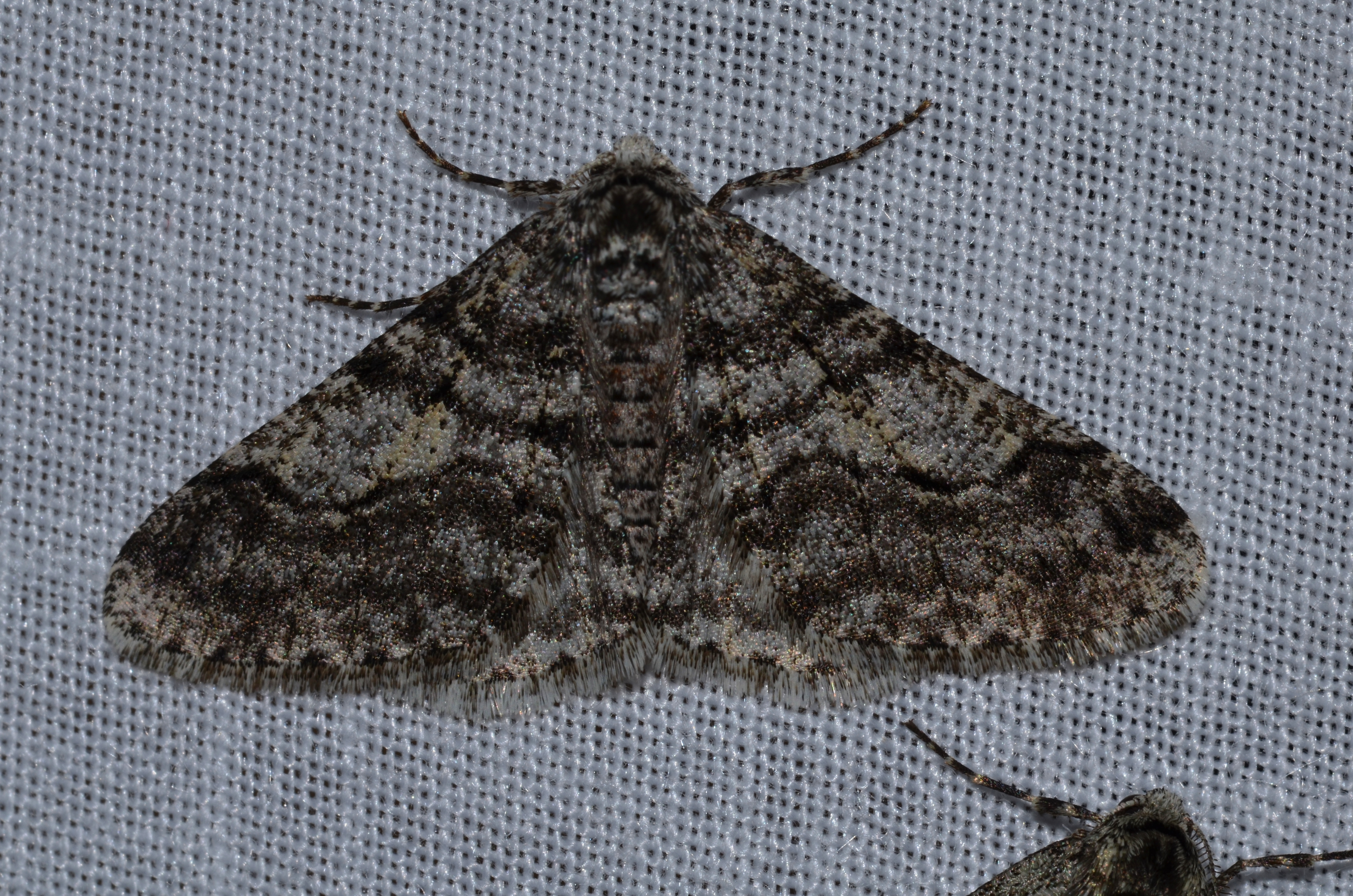

Scientific classification
- Kingdom: Animalia
- Phylum: Arthropoda
- Clade: Pancrustacea
- Class: Insecta
- Order: Lepidoptera
- Family: Geometridae
- Genus: Phigalia
- Species: P. titea

Binomial name
- Phigalia titea (Cramer, 1780)

Synonyms
- Deileptenia titearia Hübner, [1825]; Phigalia cinctaria French, 1878; Phigalia deplorans Franclemont, 1938; Phigalia olivacearia mephistarua Reiff, 1913; Phigalia revocata Walker, [1863]; Apocheima titea (Cramer, 1780)

= Phigalia titea =

Species of moth

Phigalia titea, the spiny looper or half-wing moth, is a species of moth in the family Geometridae. The species was first described by Pieter Cramer in 1780 (some sources give 1782). The average wingspan is about 34 mm.

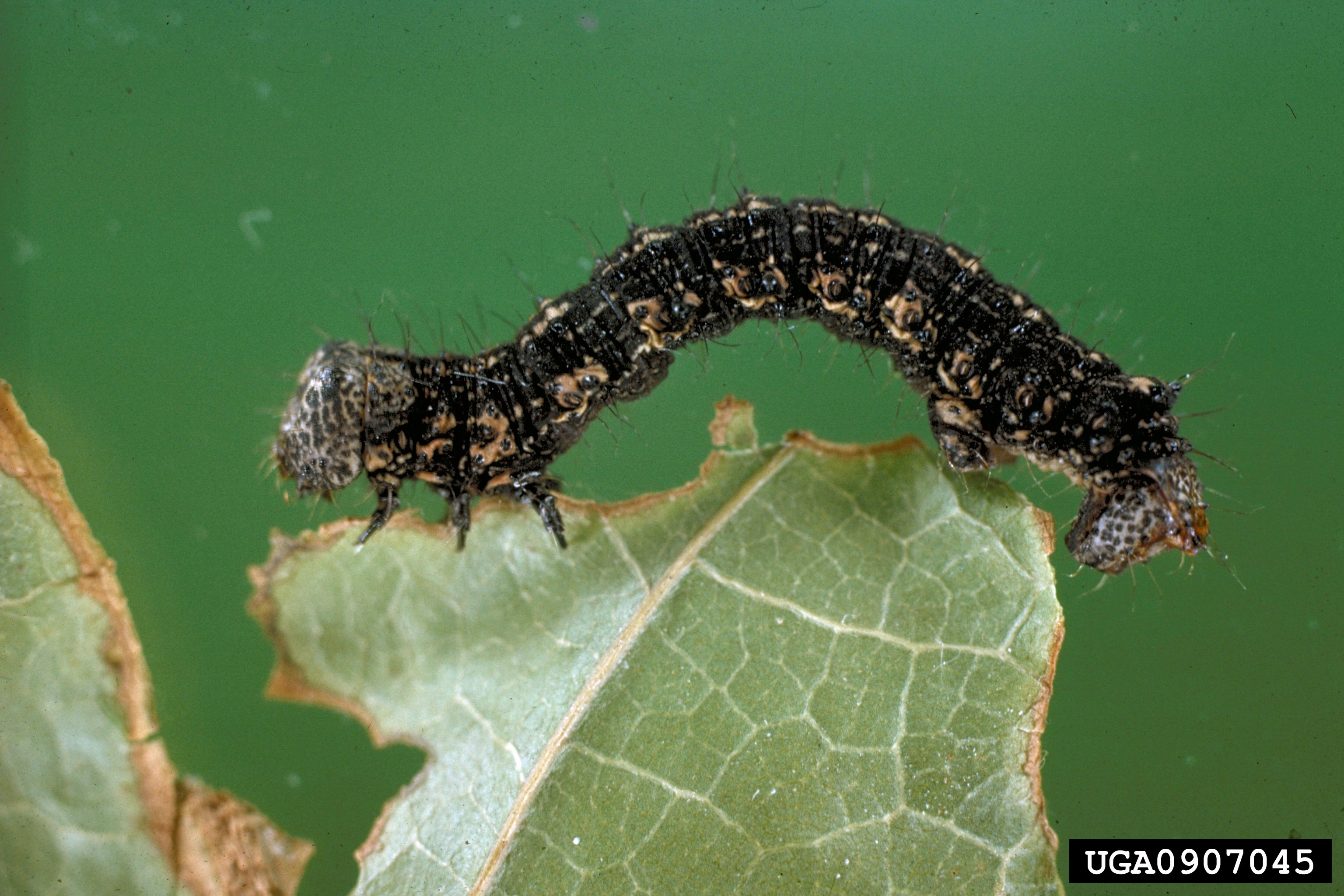
Caterpillar
