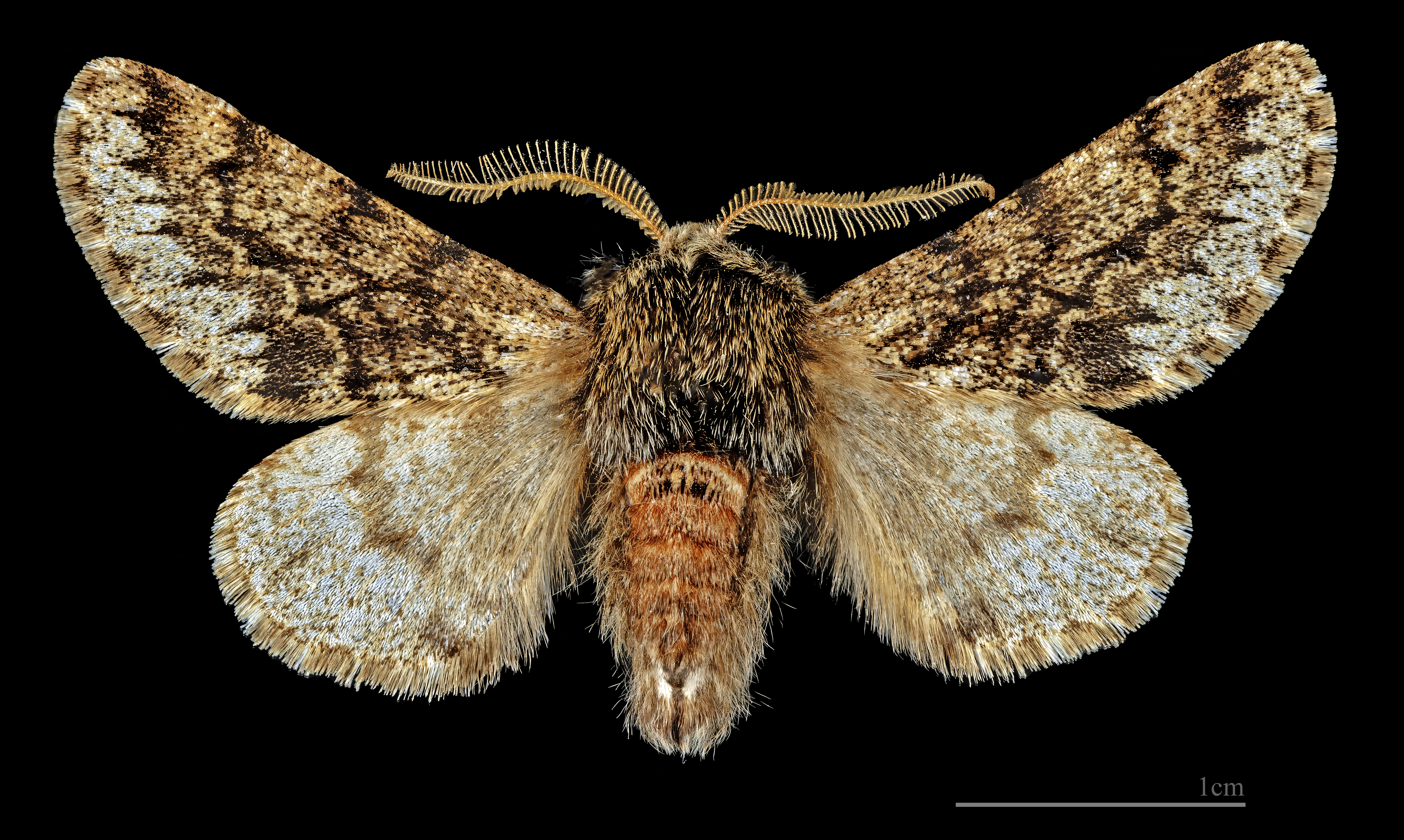
- Apocheima hispidaria (type species for the genus) male

Scientific classification
- Kingdom: Animalia
- Phylum: Arthropoda
- Clade: Pancrustacea
- Class: Insecta
- Order: Lepidoptera
- Family: Geometridae
- Tribe: Bistonini
- Genus: Apocheima; Hübner, [1825]

Synonyms
- Phigalia Duponchel, 1829; Amphidasis Stephens, 1829; Apochemia Stephens, 1835; Coniodes Hulst, 1896; Rhaphidodemas Hulst, 1896

= Apocheima =

Genus of geometer moths

Apocheima is a genus of moths in the family Geometridae erected by Jacob Hübner in 1825, also known as Phigalia.

== Species ==
- Apocheima cinerarium (Erschoff, 1874)
- Apocheima denticulata (Hulst, 1900)
- Apocheima djakonovi (Moltrecht, 1933)
- Apocheima hispidaria (Denis & Schiffermüller, 1775) – small brindled beauty
- Apocheima owadai Nakajima, 1994
- Apocheima pilosaria (Denis & Schiffermüller, 1775) – pale brindled beauty
- Apocheima plumogeraria (Hulst, 1888)
- Apocheima strigataria (Minot, 1869)
- Apocheima titea (Cramer, 1780)
- Apocheima verecundaria Leech, 1897
