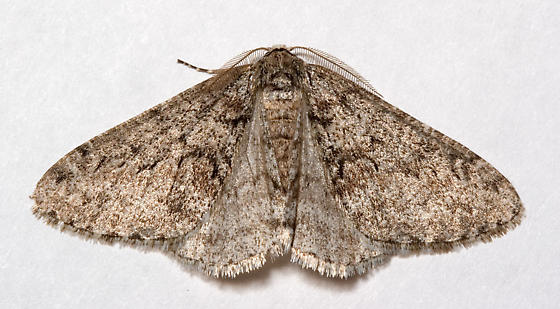

Scientific classification
- Domain: Eukaryota
- Kingdom: Animalia
- Phylum: Arthropoda
- Class: Insecta
- Order: Lepidoptera
- Family: Geometridae
- Genus: Phigalia
- Species: P. denticulata

Binomial name
- Phigalia denticulata Hulst, 1900

Synonyms
- Apocheima denticulata (Hulst, 1900)

= Phigalia denticulata =

Species of moth

Phigalia denticulata, the toothed phigalia, is a moth of the family Geometridae. It is found from Ontario and New York to Florida, west to Texas, north to Missouri. There are also records from Utah.

The wingspan is 30–37 mm for males. Adults are on wing from December to April in the south and from late March to April in the north.

The larvae probably feed on the leaves of deciduous trees.
