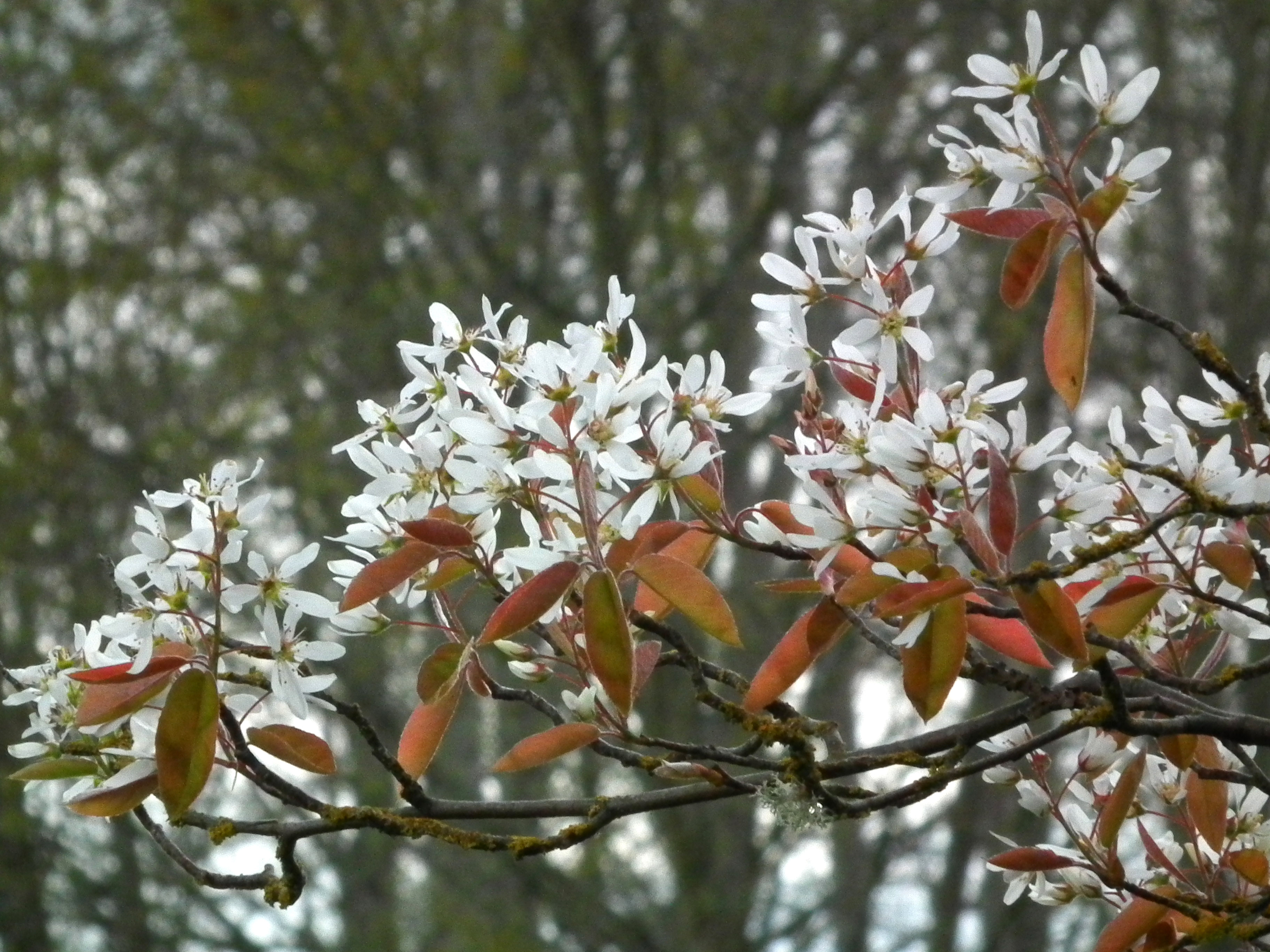

Scientific classification
- Kingdom: Plantae
- Clade: Tracheophytes
- Clade: Angiosperms
- Clade: Eudicots
- Clade: Rosids
- Order: Rosales
- Family: Rosaceae
- Genus: Amelanchier
- Species: A. × grandiflora

Binomial name
- Amelanchier × grandiflora Rehder

Synonyms
- Amelanchier asiatica Endl.

= Amelanchier × grandiflora =

Species of flowering plant

Amelanchier × grandiflora, the autumn brilliance serviceberry, is a small deciduous flowering tree or large shrub, a hybrid of garden origin between A. arborea and A. laevis, in the family Rosaceae. It produces white flowers and small red to purple edible fruits.

The Latin specific epithet grandiflora means "large-flowered".

Numerous cultivars have been developed for garden use, of which 'Princess Diana' and 'Robin Hill' have gained the Royal Horticultural Society's Award of Garden Merit.

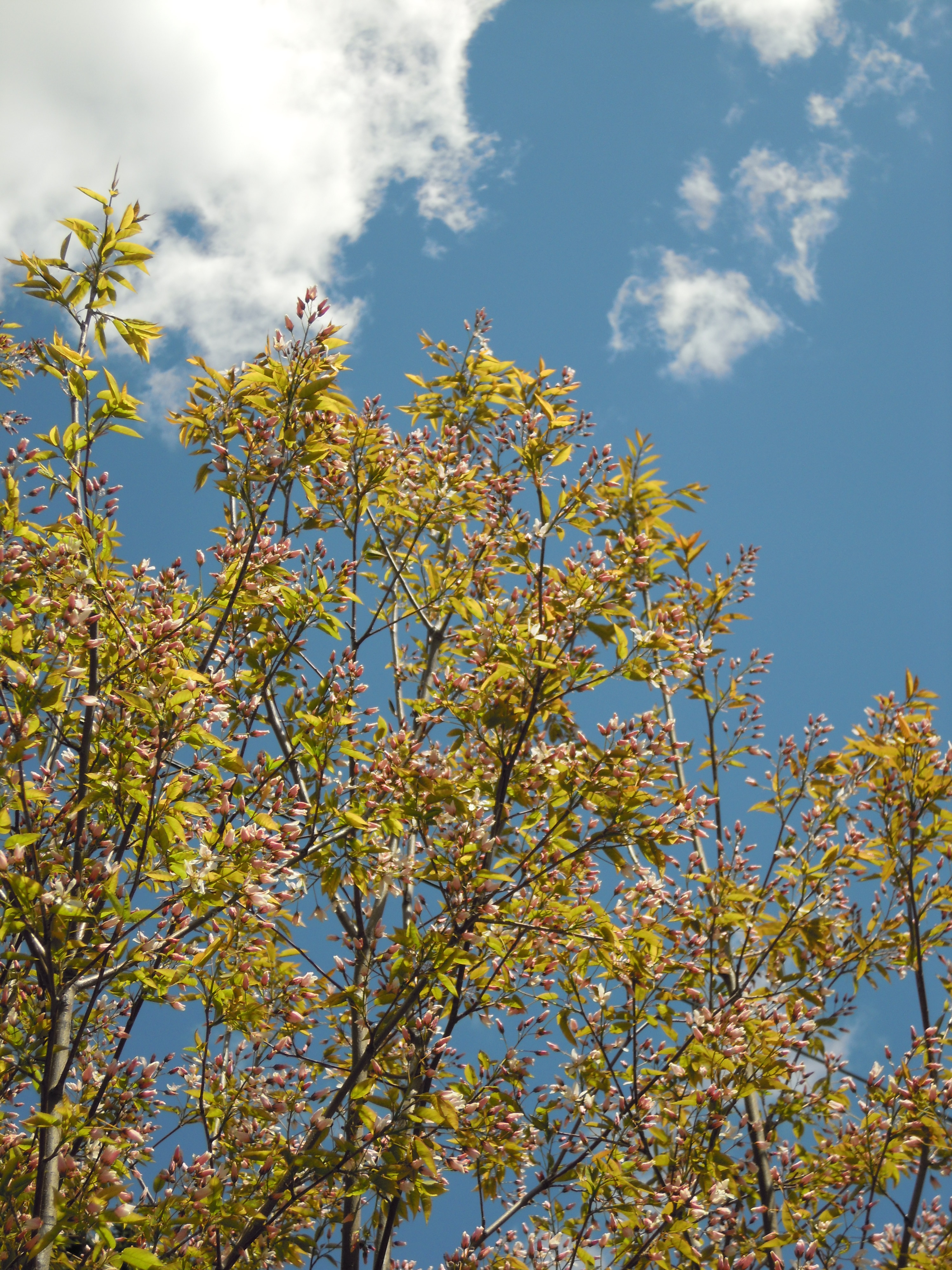

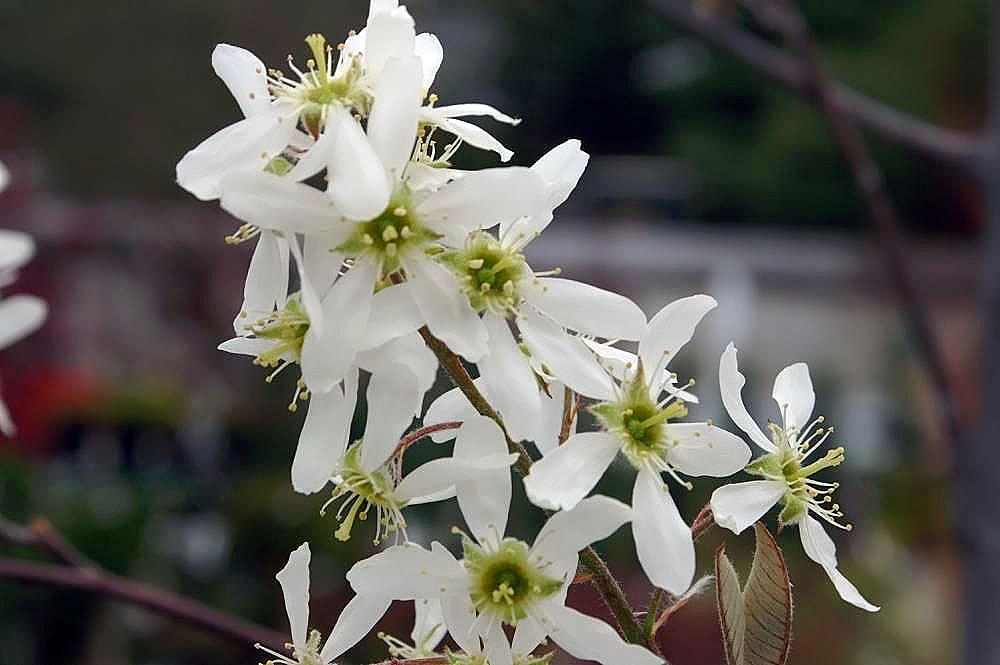
Flowers

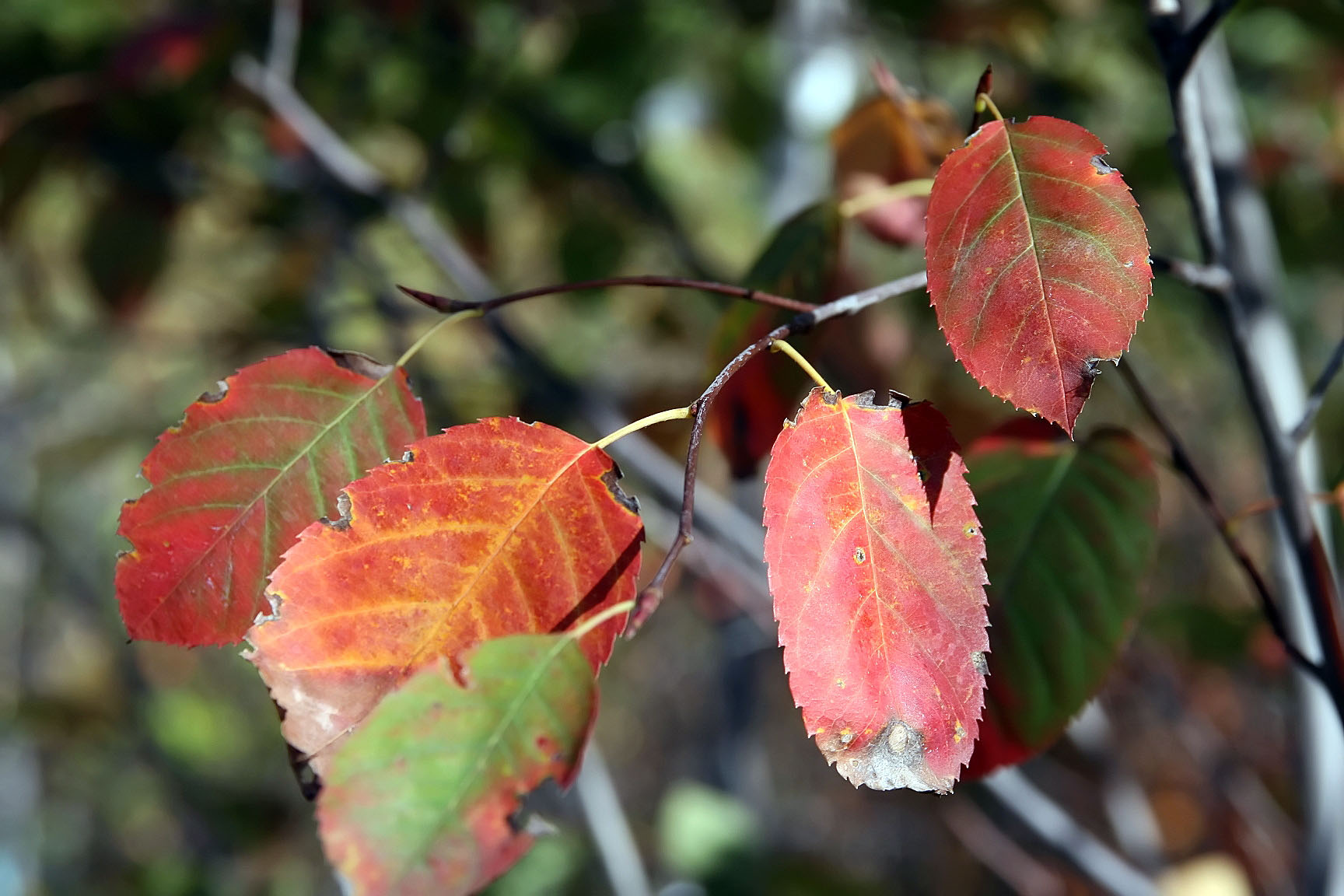
Autumn leaves

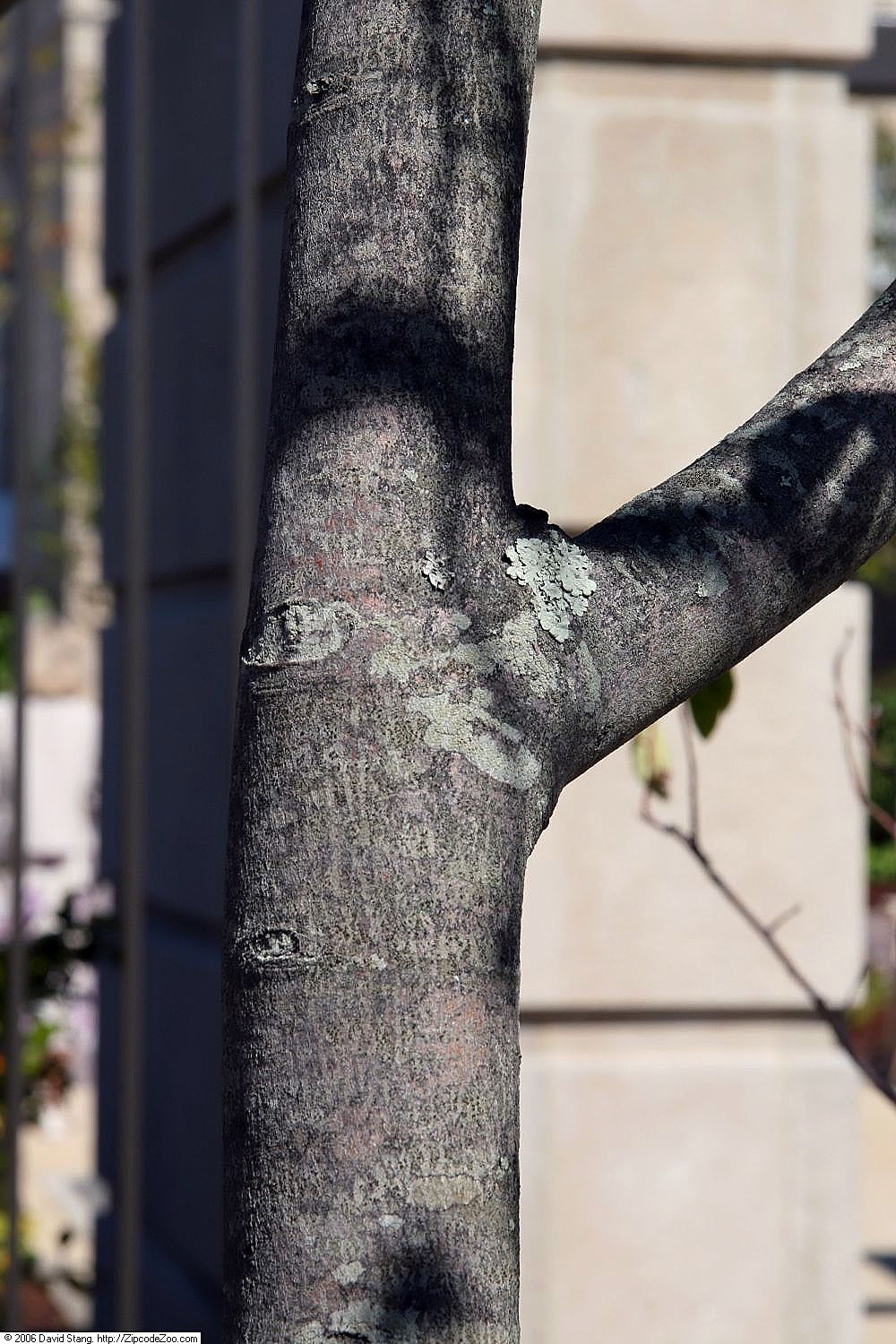
Bark
- Media related to Amelanchier × grandiflora at Wikimedia Commons
