= List of butterflies of Texas =

This is a list of Texas butterflies, all species of butterfly found in the state of Texas.

== Family Papilionidae (swallowtails) ==
=== Subfamily Papilioninae (swallowtails) ===
- Battus philenor (pipevine swallowtail)
- Battus polydamas (Polydamas swallowtail)
- Eurytides marcellus (zebra swallowtail)
- Eurytides philolaus (dark kite-swallowtail)
- Papilio polyxenes (black swallowtail)
- Papilio thoas (Thoas swallowtail)
- Papilio cresphontes (giant swallowtail)
- Papilio ornythion (ornythion swallowtail)
- Papilio astyalus (broad-banded swallowtail)
- Papilio glaucus (eastern tiger swallowtail)
- Papilio rutulus (western tiger swallowtail)
- Papilio multicaudata (two-tailed swallowtail)
- Papilio pilumnus (three-tailed swallowtail)
- Papilio troilus (spicebush swallowtail)
- Papilio garamus (magnificent swallowtail)
- Papilio palamedes (Palamedes swallowtail)
- Papilio victorinus (Victorine swallowtail)
- Papilio pharnaces (pink-spotted swallowtail)
- Papilio anchisiades (ruby-spotted swallowtail)
- Parides eurimedes (mylotes cattle heart)

== Family Pieridae (whites and sulphurs) ==
=== Subfamily Pierinae (whites) ===
- Anthocharis cethura (desert orangetip)
- Anthocharis midea (falcate orangetip)
- Anthocharis thoosa (southwestern orangetip)
- Appias drusilla (Florida white)
- Ascia monuste (great southern white)
- Catasticta nimbice (Mexican dartwhite)
- Euchloe lotta (desert marble)
- Euchloe olympia (Olympia marble)
- Ganyra josephina (giant white)
- Leptophobia aripa (mountain white)
- Pieris rapae (cabbage white)
- Pontia protodice (checkered white)
- Pontia sisymbrii (spring white)

=== Subfamily Coliadinae (sulphurs) ===
- Anteos clorinde (white angled-sulphur)
- Anteos maerula (yellow angled-sulphur)
- Aphrissa statira (Statira sulphur)
- Colias eurytheme (orange sulphur)
- Colias philodice (clouded sulphur)
- Eurema albula (ghost yellow)
- Eurema boisduvaliana (Boisduval's yellow)
- Eurema daira (barred yellow)
- Eurema dina (dina yellow)
- Eurema lisa (little yellow)
- Eurema mexicana (Mexican yellow)
- Eurema nicippe (sleepy orange)
- Eurema nise (mimosa yellow)
- Eurema proterpia (tailed orange)
- Eurema salome (Salome yellow)
- Kricogonia lyside (lyside sulphur)
- Nathalis iole (dainty sulphur)
- Phoebis agarithe (large orange sulphur)
- Phoebis argante (apricot sulphur)
- Phoebis neocypris (tailed sulphur)
- Phoebis philea (orange-barred sulphur)
- Phoebis sennae (cloudless sulphur)
- Zerene cesonia (southern dogface)

=== Subfamily Dismorphiinae (mimic-whites) ===
- Enantia albania (costa-spotted mimic-white)

== Family Lycaenidae (gossamer-wing butterflies) ==
=== Subfamily Miletinae (harvesters) ===
- Feniseca tarquinius (harvester)

=== Subfamily Lycaeninae (coppers) ===
- Lycaena dione (gray copper)

=== Subfamily Theclinae (hairstreaks) ===
- Allosmaitia strophius (Strophius hairstreak)
- Atlides halesus (great purple hairstreak)
- Callophrys gryneus (juniper hairstreak)
- Callophrys henrici (Henry's elfin)
- Callophrys irus (frosted elfin)
- Callophrys mcfarlandi (sandia hairstreak)
- Callophrys niphon (eastern pine elfin)
- Callophrys spinetorum (thicket hairstreak)
- Callophrys xami (xami hairstreak)
- Calycopis cecrops (red-banded hairstreak)
- Calycopis isobeon (dusky-blue groundstreak)
- Chlorostrymon simaethis (silver-banded hairstreak)
- Chlorostrymon telea (Telea hairstreak)
- Cyanophrys goodsoni (Goodson's greenstreak)
- Cyanophrys herodotus (tropical greenstreak)
- Cyanophrys miserabilis (Clench's greenstreak)
- Electrostrymon canus (muted hairstreak)
- Electrostrymon sangala (ruddy hairstreak)
- Erora quaderna (Arizona hairstreak)
- Eumaeus toxea (Mexican cycadian)
- Fixsenia favonius (southern hairstreak)
- Fixsenia polingi (Poling's hairstreak)
- Hypaurotis crysalus (Colorado hairstreak)
- Ministrymon azia (gray ministreak)
- Ministrymon clytie (Clytie ministreak)
- Ministrymon echion (red-spotted hairstreak)
- Ministrymon janevicroy (Vicroy’s ministreak)
- Ministrymon leda (Leda ministreak)
- Ocaria ocrisia (black hairstreak)
- Oenomaus ortygnus (aquamarine hairstreak)
- Parrhasius m-album (white m hairstreak)
- Phaeostrymon alcestis (soapberry hairstreak)
- Rekoa marius (Marius hairstreak)
- Rekoa palegon (gold-bordered hairstreak)
- Rekoa zebina (zebina hairstreak)
- Satyrium behrii (Behr's hairstreak)
- Satyrium calanus (banded hairstreak)
- Satyrium edwardsii (Edwards' hairstreak)
- Satyrium kingi (King's hairstreak)
- Satyrium liparops (striped hairstreak)
- Satyrium titus (coral hairstreak)
- Siderus tephraeus (pearly-gray hairstreak)
- Strymon albata (white scrub-hairstreak)
- Strymon alea (Lacey's scrub-hairstreak)
- Strymon bazochii (lantana scrub-hairstreak)
- Strymon bebrycia (red-lined scrub-hairstreak)
- Strymon cestri (tailless scrub-hairstreak)
- Strymon istapa (mallow scrub-hairstreak)
- Strymon melinus (gray hairstreak)
- Strymon rufofusca (red-crescent scrub-hairstreak)
- Strymon serapio (bromeliad scrub-hairstreak)
- Strymon yojoa (Yojoa scrub-hairstreak)

=== Subfamily Polyommatinae (blues) ===
- Brephidium exile (western pygmy-blue)
- Brephidium isophthalma (eastern pygmy-blue)
- Celastrina ladon (spring azure)
- Celastrina neglecta (summer azure)
- Cupido comyntas (eastern tailed-blue)
- Echinargus isola (Reakirt's blue)
- Euphilotes rita (rita dotted-blue)
- Glaucopsyche lygdamus (silvery blue)
- Hemiargus ceraunus (Ceraunus blue)
- Icaricia lupini (lupine blue)
- Leptotes cassius (Cassius blue)
- Leptotes marina (marine blue)
- Plebejus melissa (Melissa blue)
- Zizula cyna (cyna blue)

== Family Riodinidae (metalmarks) ==
- Apodemia chisosensis (Chisos metalmark)
- Apodemia duryi (Mexican metalmark)
- Apodemia hepburni (Hepburn's metalmark)
- Apodemia multiplaga (narrow-winged metalmark)
- Apodemia palmeri (Palmer's metalmark)
- Apodemia phyciodoides (crescent metalmark)
- Apodemia walkeri (Walker's metalmark)
- Calephelis nemesis (fatal metalmark)
- Calephelis nilus (rounded metalmark)
- Calephelis rawsoni (Rawson's metalmark)
- Calephelis virginiensis (little metalmark)
- Caria ino (red-bordered metalmark)
- Emesis emesia (curve-winged metalmark)
- Emesis tenedia (falcate metalmark)
- Emesis zela (Zela metalmark)
- Lasaia sula (blue metalmark)
- Melanis pixe (red-bordered pixie)

== Family Nymphalidae (brush-footed butterflies) ==
=== Subfamily Libytheinae (snouts) ===
- Libytheana carinenta (American snout)

=== Subfamily Heliconiinae (heliconians and fritillaries) ===
- Agraulis vanillae (Gulf fritillary)
- Dione moneta (Mexican silverspot)
- Dryadula phaetusa (banded orange heliconian)
- Dryas julia (Julia heliconian)
- Eueides isabella (Isabella's heliconian)
- Euptoieta claudia (variegated fritillary)
- Euptoieta hegesia (Mexican fritillary)
- Heliconius charithonia (zebra heliconian)
- Heliconius erato (Erato heliconian)
- Philaethria dido (scarce bamboo page)

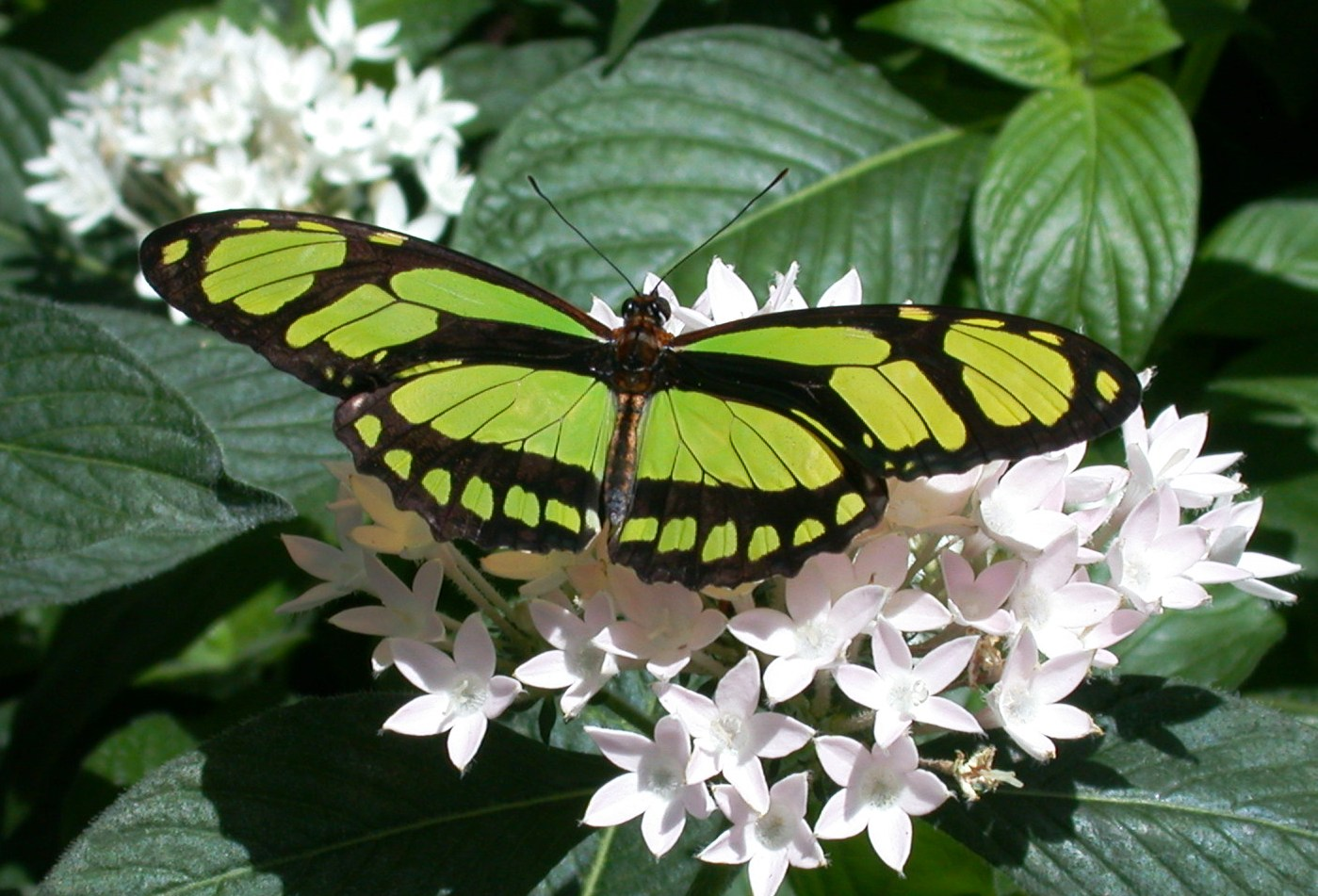
Philaethria dido

- Speyeria cybele (great spangled fritillary)

=== Subfamily Nymphalinae (true brush-foots) ===
- Anartia fatima (banded peacock)
- Anartia jatrophae (white peacock)
- Chlosyne acastus (sagebrush checkerspot)
- Chlosyne definita (definite patch)
- Chlosyne endeis (banded patch)
- Chlosyne gorgone (gorgone checkerspot)
- Chlosyne janais (crimson patch)
- Chlosyne lacinia (bordered patch)
- Chlosyne marina (red-spotted patch)
- Chlosyne nycteis (silvery checkerspot)
- Chlosyne rosita (rosita patch)
- Dymasia dymas (tiny checkerspot)
- Euphydryas chalcedona (variable checkerspot)
- Euphydryas phaeton (Baltimore)
- Hypolimnas misippus (mimic)
- Junonia coenia (common buckeye)
- Junonia genoveva (tropical buckeye)
- Microtia elva (elf)
- Nymphalis antiopa (mourning cloak)
- Phyciodes argentea (chestnut crescent)
- Phyciodes graphica (graphic crescent)
- Phyciodes mylitta (Mylitta crescent)
- Phyciodes phaon (Phaon crescent)
- Phyciodes picta (painted crescent)
- Phyciodes ptolyca (black crescent)
- Phyciodes texana (Texan crescent)
- Phyciodes tharos (pearl crescent)
- Phyciodes tulcis (Tulcis crescent)
- Poladryas minuta (dotted checkerspot)
- Polygonia comma (eastern comma)
- Polygonia interrogationis (question mark)
- Siproeta epaphus (rusty-tipped page)
- Siproeta stelenes (malachite)
- Texola elada (Elada checkerspot)
- Thessalia fulvia (Fulvia checkerspot)
- Thessalia theona (Theona checkerspot)
- Vanessa annabella (West Coast lady)
- Vanessa atalanta (red admiral)
- Vanessa cardui (painted lady)
- Vanessa virginiensis (American lady)

=== Subfamily Limenitidinae (admirals and relatives) ===
- Adelpha basiloides (spot-celled sister)
- Adelpha bredowii (California sister)
- Adelpha fessonia (band-celled sister)
- Biblis hyperia (red rim)
- Diaethria anna (Anna's eighty-eight)
- Diaethria asteria (Mexican eighty-eight)
- Dynamine dyonis (blue-eyed sailor)
- Dynamine tithia (Tithian sailor)
- Epiphile adrasta (common banner)
- Eunica monima (dingy purplewing)
- Eunica tatila (Florida purplewing)
- Hamadryas amphinome (red cracker)
- Hamadryas februa (gray cracker)
- Hamadryas feronia (variable cracker)
- Hamadryas fornax
- Hamadryas guatemalena (Guatemalan cracker)
- Hamadryas iphthime (brownish cracker)
- Historis acheronta (tailed cecropian)
- Historis odius (Orion)
- Limenitis archippus (viceroy)
- Limenitis arthemis astyanax ('Astyanax' red-spotted purple)
- Limenitis arthemis (red-spotted purple)
- Limenitis weidemeyerii (Weidemeyer's admiral)
- Marpesia chiron (many-banded daggerwing)
- Marpesia coresia (waiter daggerwing)
- Marpesia petreus (ruddy daggerwing)
- Mestra amymone (common mestra)
- Myscelia cyananthe (blackened bluewing)
- Myscelia ethusa (Mexican bluewing)
- Smyrna blomfildia (Blomfild's beauty)
- Smyrna karwinskii (Karwinski's beauty)

=== Subfamily Charaxinae (leafwings) ===
- Anaea andria (goatweed leafwing)
- Anaea echemus (chestnut leafwing)
- Anaea glycerium (angled leafwing)
- Anaea pithyusa (pale-spotted leafwing)
- Anaea troglodyta (tropical leafwing)

=== Subfamily Apaturinae (emperors) ===
- Asterocampa celtis (hackberry emperor)
- Asterocampa clyton (tawny emperor)
- Asterocampa leilia (empress leilia)
- Doxocopa laure (silver emperor)
- Doxocopa pavon (Pavon emperor)

=== Subfamily Satyrinae (satyrs) ===
- Cercyonis meadii (Mead's wood nymph)
- Cercyonis pegala (common wood nymph)
- Cyllopsis gemma (gemmed satyr)
- Cyllopsis pertepida (canyonland satyr)
- Enodia anthedon (northern pearly eye)
- Enodia creola (Creole pearly eye)
- Enodia portlandia (southern pearly eye)
- Gyrocheilus patrobas (red-bordered satyr)
- Hermeuptychia sosybius (Carolina satyr)
- Megisto cymela (little wood satyr)
- Megisto rubricata (red satyr)
- Megisto viola (Viola's wood satyr)
- Neonympha areolata (Georgia satyr)

=== Subfamily Danainae (monarchs) ===
- Danaus eresimus (soldier)
- Danaus gilippus (queen)
- Danaus plexippus (monarch)
- Dircenna klugii (Klug's clearwing)
- Lycorea cleobaea (tiger mimic-queen)

== Family Hesperiidae (skippers) ==
=== Subfamily Pyrrhopyginae (firetips) ===
- Pyrrhopyge araxes (dull firetip)

=== Subfamily Pyrginae (spread-wing skippers) ===
- Achalarus albociliatus (Skinner's cloudywing)
- Achalarus casica (desert cloudywing)
- Achalarus jalapus (jalapus cloudywing)
- Achalarus lyciades (hoary edge)
- Achalarus toxeus (coyote cloudywing)
- Achlyodes pallida
- Aguna asander (gold-spotted aguna)
- Aguna claxon (emerald aguna)
- Aguna metophis (tailed aguna)
- Arteurotia tractipennis (starred skipper)
- Astraptes alardus (frosted flasher)
- Astraptes alector (Gilbert's flasher)
- Astraptes anaphus (yellow-tipped flasher)
- Astraptes egregius (small-spotted flasher)
- Astraptes fulgerator (two-barred flasher)
- Autochton cellus (golden banded-skipper)
- Autochton cincta (Chisos banded-skipper)
- Autochton pseudocellus (Sonoran banded-skipper)
- Bolla brennus (obscure bolla)
- Bolla clytius (mottled bolla)
- Cabares potrillo (potrillo skipper)
- Carrhenes canescens (hoary skipper)
- Celaenorrhinus fritzgaertneri (Fritzgaertner's flat)
- Celaenorrhinus stallingsi (Stallings' flat)
- Celotes limpia (scarce streaky-skipper)
- Celotes nessus (common streaky-skipper)
- Chioides catillus (white-striped longtail)
- Chioides zilpa (Zilpa longtail)
- Chiomara georgina (white-patched skipper)
- Codatractus alcaeus (white-crescent longtail)
- Codatractus arizonensis (Arizona skipper)
- Cogia calchas (mimosa skipper)
- Cogia hippalus (acacia skipper)
- Cogia outis (Outis skipper)
- Eantis tamenund (sickle-winged skipper)
- Epargyreus clarus (silver-spotted skipper)
- Epargyreus exadeus (broken silverdrop)
- Erynnis baptisiae (wild indigo duskywing)
- Erynnis brizo (sleepy duskywing)
- Erynnis funeralis (funereal duskywing)
- Erynnis horatius (Horace's duskywing)
- Erynnis juvenalis (Juvenal's duskywing)
- Erynnis martialis (mottled duskywing)
- Erynnis meridianus (meridian duskywing)
- Erynnis scudderi (Scudder's duskywing)
- Erynnis telemachus (Rocky Mountain duskywing)
- Erynnis tristis (mournful duskywing)
- Erynnis zarucco (zarucco duskywing)
- Gesta invisa (false duskywing)
- Gorgythion begga (variegated skipper)
- Grais stigmatica (hermit skipper)
- Heliopetes arsalte (veined white-skipper)
- Heliopetes laviana (Laviana white-skipper)
- Heliopetes macaira (Turk's-cap white-skipper)
- Heliopyrgus domicella (Erichson's white-skipper)
- Hesperopsis alpheus (saltbush sootywing)
- Nisoniades rubescens (purplish-black skipper)
- Noctuana stator (red-studded skipper)
- Pellicia arina (glazed pellicia)
- Pellicia dimidiata (morning glory pellicia)
- Phocides belus
- Phocides palemon (guava skipper)
- Pholisora catullus (common sootywing)
- Pholisora mejicana (Mexican sootywing)
- Polygonus leo (hammock skipper)
- Polygonus manueli (Manuel's skipper)
- Polythrix mexicanus (Mexican longtail)
- Polythrix octomaculata (eight-spotted longtail)
- Proteides mercurius (mercurial skipper)
- Pyrgus albescens (white checkered skipper)
- Pyrgus communis (common checkered-skipper)
- Pyrgus oileus (tropical checkered skipper)
- Pyrgus philetas (desert checkered skipper)
- Pyrgus scriptura (small checkered-skipper)
- Sostrata nordica (blue-studded skipper)
- Spathilepia clonius (falcate skipper)
- Staphylus azteca (Aztec scallopwing)
- Staphylus ceos (golden-headed scallopwing)
- Staphylus hayhurstii (Hayhurst's scallopwing)
- Staphylus mazans (Mazans scallopwing)
- Systasea pulverulenta (Texas powdered skipper)
- Systasea zampa (Arizona powdered skipper)
- Thorybes bathyllus (southern cloudywing)
- Thorybes confusis (confusing cloudywing)
- Thorybes drusius (Drusius cloudywing)
- Thorybes pylades (northern cloudywing)
- Timochares ruptifasciatus (brown-banded skipper)
- Typhedanus undulatus (mottled longtail)
- Urbanus belli (double-striped longtail)
- Urbanus dorantes (Dorantes longtail)
- Urbanus doryssus (white-tailed longtail)
- Urbanus esmeraldus (Esmeralda longtail)
- Urbanus procne (brown longtail)
- Urbanus pronus (pronus longtail)
- Urbanus proteus (long-tailed skipper)
- Urbanus simplicius (plain longtail)
- Urbanus tanna (Tanna longtail)
- Urbanus teleus (Teleus longtail)
- Xenophanes tryxus (glassy-winged skipper)
- Zestusa dorus (short-tailed skipper)

=== Subfamily Hesperiinae (grass skippers) ===
- Adopaeoides prittwitzi (sunrise skipper)
- Amblyscirtes aenus (bronze roadside-skipper)
- Amblyscirtes aesculapius (lace-winged roadside-skipper)
- Amblyscirtes alternata (dusky roadside-skipper)
- Amblyscirtes belli (Bell's roadside-skipper)
- Amblyscirtes cassus (cassus roadside-skipper)
- Amblyscirtes celia (Celia's roadside skipper)
- Amblyscirtes eos (dotted roadside-skipper)
- Amblyscirtes hegon (pepper and salt skipper)
- Amblyscirtes nereus (slaty roadside-skipper)
- Amblyscirtes nysa (Nysa roadside-skipper)
- Amblyscirtes oslari (Oslar's roadside-skipper)
- Amblyscirtes phylace (orange-headed roadside-skipper)
- Amblyscirtes simius (simius roadside-skipper)
- Amblyscirtes texanae (Texas roadside-skipper)
- Amblyscirtes vialis (common roadside-skipper)
- Anatrytone logan (Delaware skipper)
- Anatrytone mazai (glowing skipper)
- Ancyloxypha arene (tropical least skipper)
- Ancyloxypha numitor (least skipper)
- Atalopedes campestris (sachem)
- Atrytone arogos (arogos skipper)
- Atrytonopsis edwardsii (sheep skipper)
- Atrytonopsis hianna (dusted skipper)
- Atrytonopsis pittacus (white-barred skipper)
- Atrytonopsis python (python skipper)
- Atrytonopsis vierecki (Viereck's skipper)
- Calpodes ethlius (Brazilian skipper)
- Conga chydaea (hidden-ray skipper)
- Copaeodes aurantiacia (orange skipperling)
- Copaeodes minima (southern skipperling)
- Corticea corticea (redundant skipper)
- Cymaenes odilia trebius ('Trebius' fawn-spotted skipper)
- Decinea percosius (double-dotted skipper)
- Euphyes bayensis (bay skipper)
- Euphyes dion (Dion skipper)
- Euphyes dukesi (Dukes' skipper)
- Euphyes vestris (dun skipper)
- Hesperia attalus (dotted skipper)
- Hesperia juba (Juba skipper)
- Hesperia meskei (Meske's skipper)
- Hesperia metea (cobweb skipper)
- Hesperia ottoe (ottoe skipper)
- Hesperia pahaska (Pahaska skipper)
- Hesperia uncas (Uncas skipper)
- Hesperia viridis (green skipper)
- Hesperia woodgatei (Apache skipper)
- Hylephila phyleus (fiery skipper)
- Lerema accius (clouded skipper)
- Lerema ancillaris (Liris skipper)
- Lerodea arabus (olive-clouded skipper)
- Lerodea eufala (Eufala skipper)
- Monca telata tyrtaeus ('Tyrtaeus' violet-patched skipper)
- Nastra julia (Julia's skipper)
- Nastra lherminier (swarthy skipper)
- Nastra neamathla (Neamathla skipper)
- Nyctelius nyctelius (violet-banded skipper)
- Oarisma edwardsii (Edwards' skipperling)
- Oligoria maculata (twin-spot skipper)
- Panoquina evansi (Evans' skipper)
- Panoquina hecebola (Hecebolus skipper)
- Panoquina leucas (purple-washed skipper)
- Panoquina ocola (ocola skipper)
- Panoquina panoquin (salt marsh skipper)
- Panoquina panoquinoides (obscure skipper)
- Perichares philetes (green-backed ruby-eye)
- Piruna hafernicki (Chisos skipperling)
- Piruna microstictus (small-spotted skipperling)
- Piruna pirus (russet skipperling)
- Piruna polingi (four-spotted skipperling)
- Poanes aaroni (Aaron's skipper)
- Poanes melane (umber skipper)
- Poanes taxiles (Taxiles skipper)
- Poanes viator (broad-winged skipper)
- Poanes yehl (Yehl skipper)
- Poanes zabulon (Zabulon skipper)
- Polites carus (Carus skipper)
- Polites origenes (crossline skipper)
- Polites peckius (Peck's skipper)
- Polites rhesus (rhesus skipper)
- Polites themistocles (tawny-edged skipper)
- Polites vibex (whirlabout)
- Pompeius verna (little glassywing)
- Problema byssus (byssus skipper)
- Quasimellana eulogius (common mellana)
- Quasimellana mexicana
- Rhinthon cubana osca (osca skipper)
- Stinga morrisoni (Morrison's skipper)
- Synapte malitiosa (malicious skipper)
- Synapte salenus (salenus skipper)
- Thespieus macareus (chestnut-marked skipper)
- Vettius fantasos (fantastic skipper)
- Vidius perigenes (pale-rayed skipper)
- Wallengrenia egeremet (northern broken-dash)
- Wallengrenia otho (southern broken-dash)

=== Subfamily Megathyminae (giant-skippers) ===
- Agathymus mariae (Mary's giant-skipper)
- Agathymus neumoegeni (orange giant-skipper)
- Agathymus remingtoni (Coahuila giant-skipper)
- Megathymus streckeri (Strecker's giant-skipper)
- Megathymus ursus (ursine giant-skipper)
- Megathymus yuccae (yucca giant-skipper)
- Stallingsia maculosa (manfreda giant-skipper)
