= List of butterflies of the Cayman Islands =

Location of the Cayman Islands

This is a list of butterflies of the Cayman Islands. According to a recent estimate, there are 52 butterfly species found on the Cayman Islands. The abbreviation (Es) is used to indicate endemic subspecies.

== Papilionidae ==
- Battus polydamas cubensis (Dufrane, 1946) – Polydamas swallowtail
- Heraclides andraemon andraemon (Hübner, 1823) – Andraemon swallowtail
- Heraclides andraemon tailori (Rothschild & Jordan, 1906) – Grand Cayman swallowtail (Es)
- Heraclides aristodemus (Esper, 1794) – dusky swallowtail

== Pieridae ==
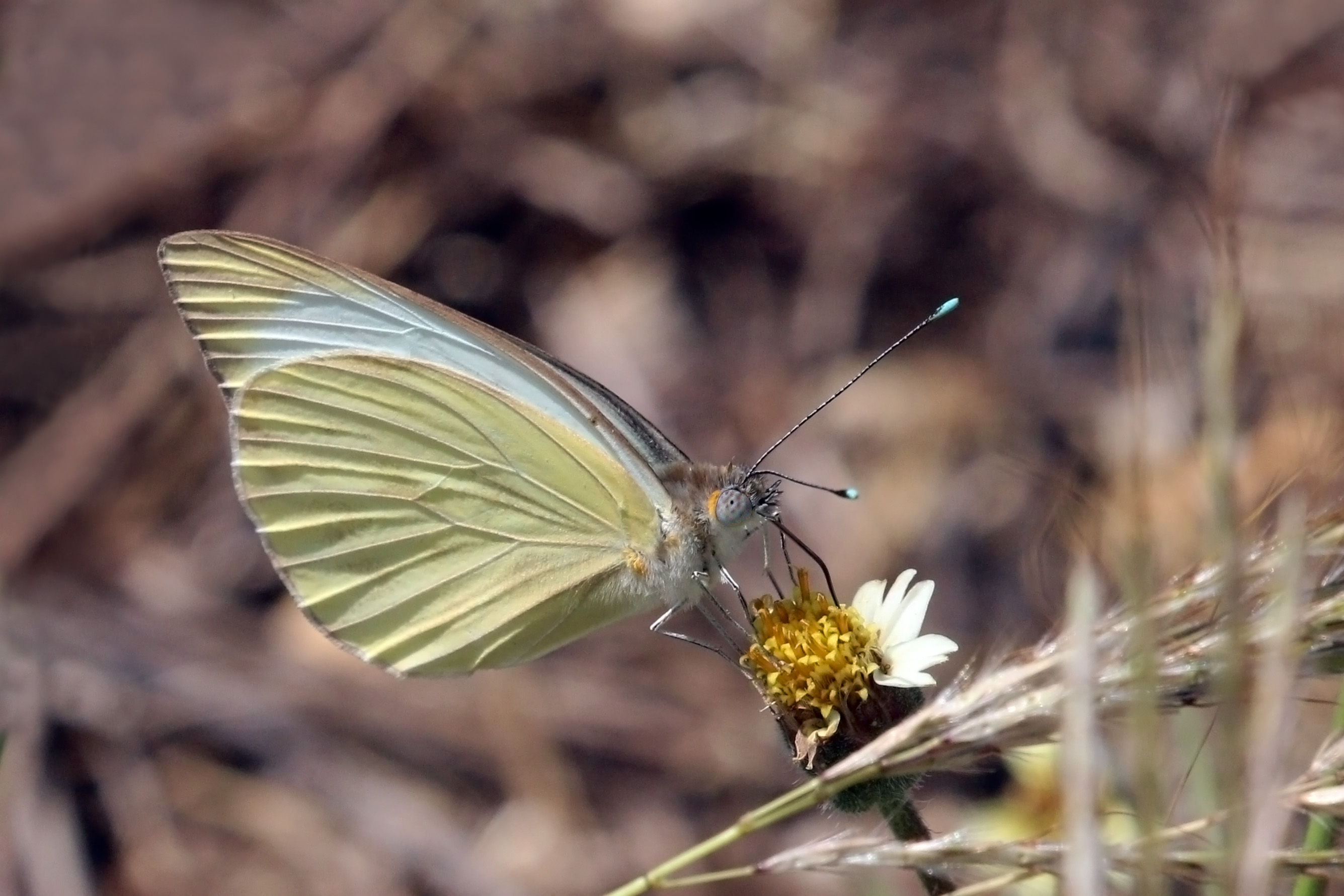
Great southern white

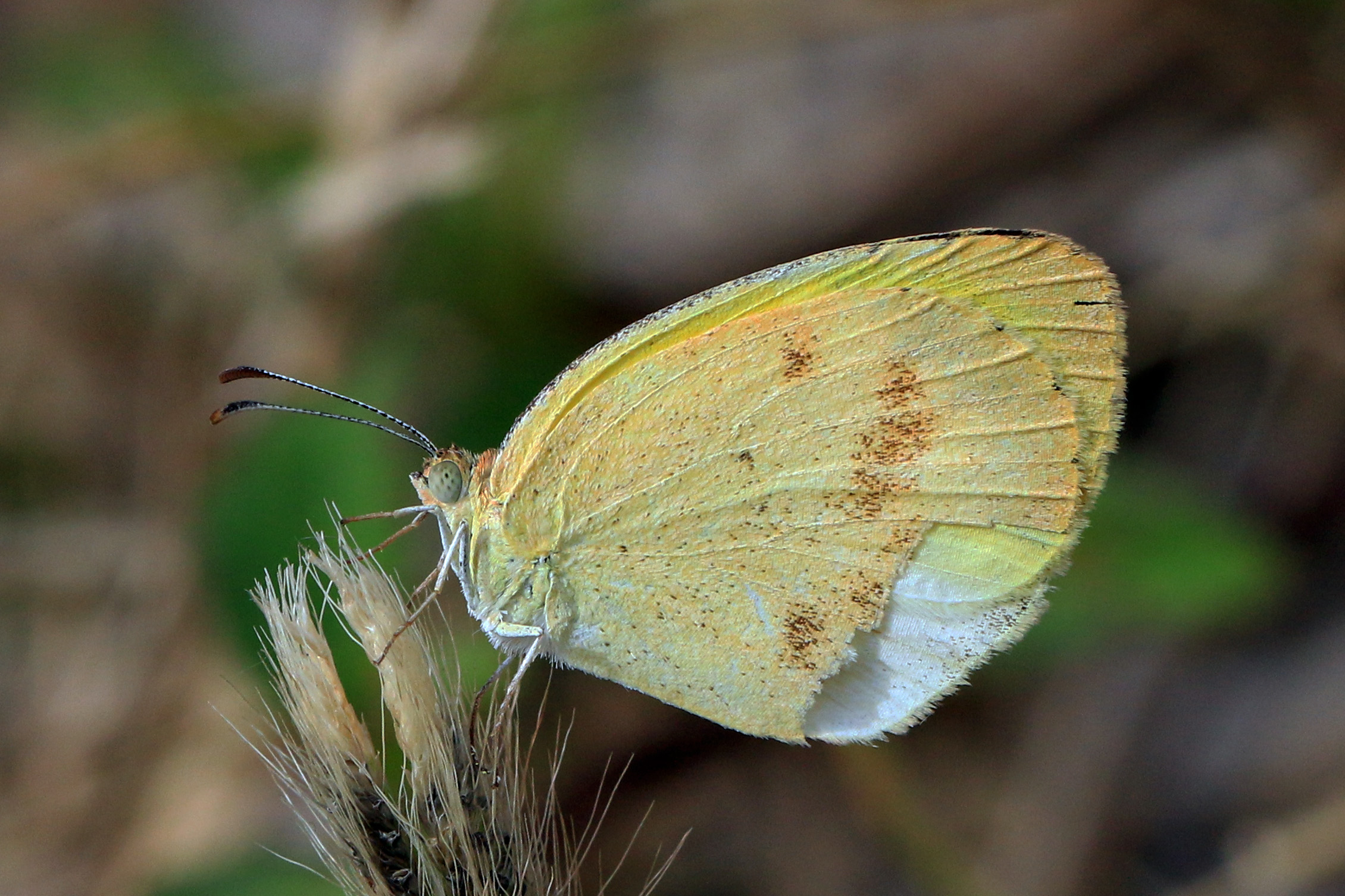
False barred sulphur

- Abaeis nicippe (Cramer, 1779) – black bordered orange, sleepy orange
- Anteos maerula (Fabricius, 1775) – yellow angled sulphur
- Aphrissa orbis (Poey, 1832) – orbed sulphur
- Aphrissa statira cubana (D'Almeida, 1939) – migrant sulphur
- Ascia monuste eubotea (Godart, 1819) – great southern white
- Eurema daira palmira (Godart, 1819) – barred sulphur
- Eurema elathea (Cramer, 1777) – false barred sulphur
- Glutophrissa drusilla poeyi (Butler, 1872) – Florida white
- Nathalis iole (Boisduval, 1836) – dainty sulphur, dwarf yellow
- Phoebis agarithe antillia (Brown, 1929) – giant orange sulphur
- Phoebis argante (Fabricius, 1775) – apricot sulphur, Argante giant sulphur
- Phoebis philea (Linnaeus, 1763) – orange-barred sulphur
- Phoebis sennae sennae (Linnaeus, 1758) – cloudless sulphur
- Pyrisitia lisa euterpe (Ménétriés, 1832) – little sulphur
- Pyrisitia messalina (Fabricius, 1787) – shy yellow
- Pyrisitia nise nise (Cramer, 1775) – mimosa sulphur, blacktip sulphur

== Nymphalidae ==
=== Nymphalinae ===
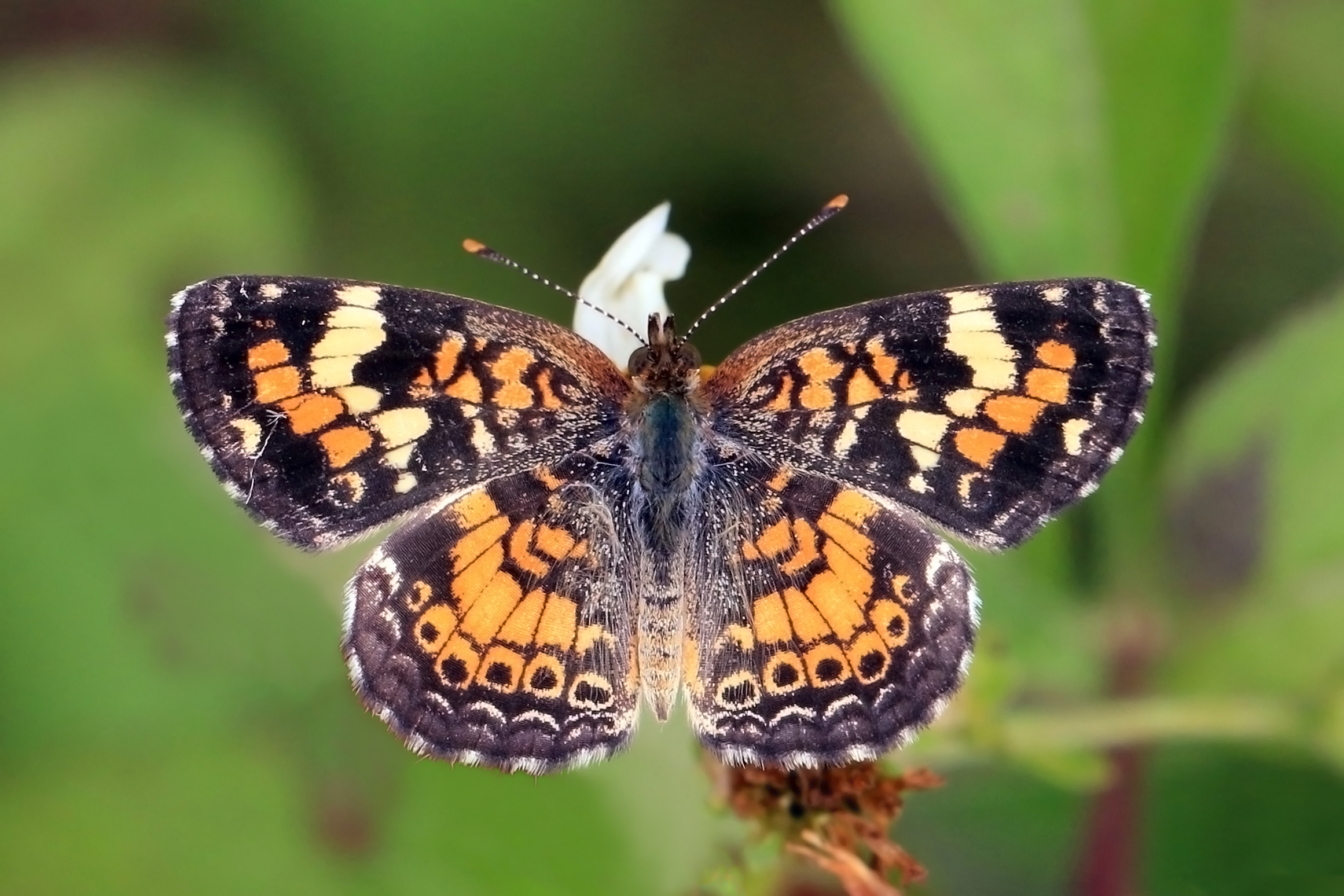
Crescent spot

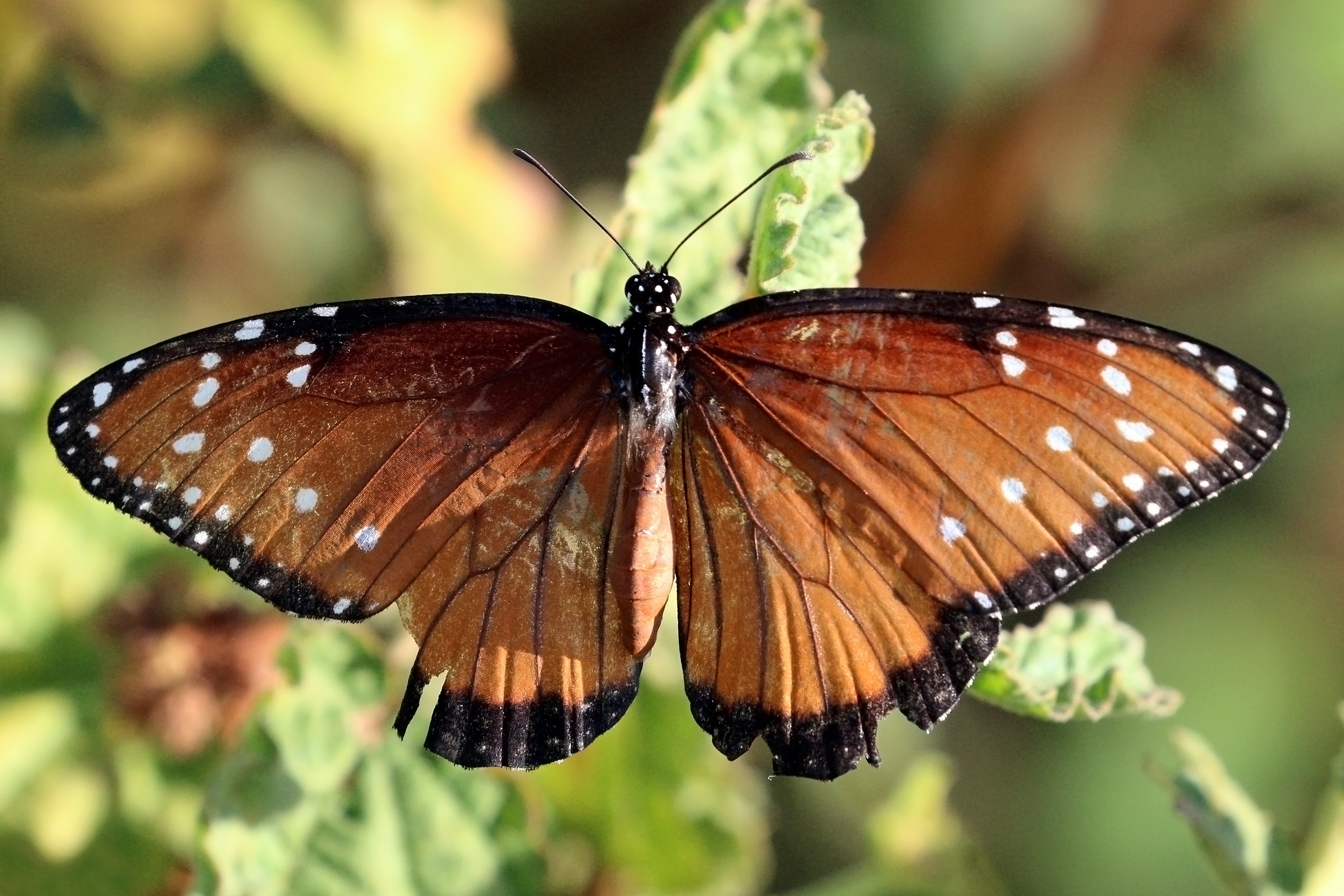
Queen

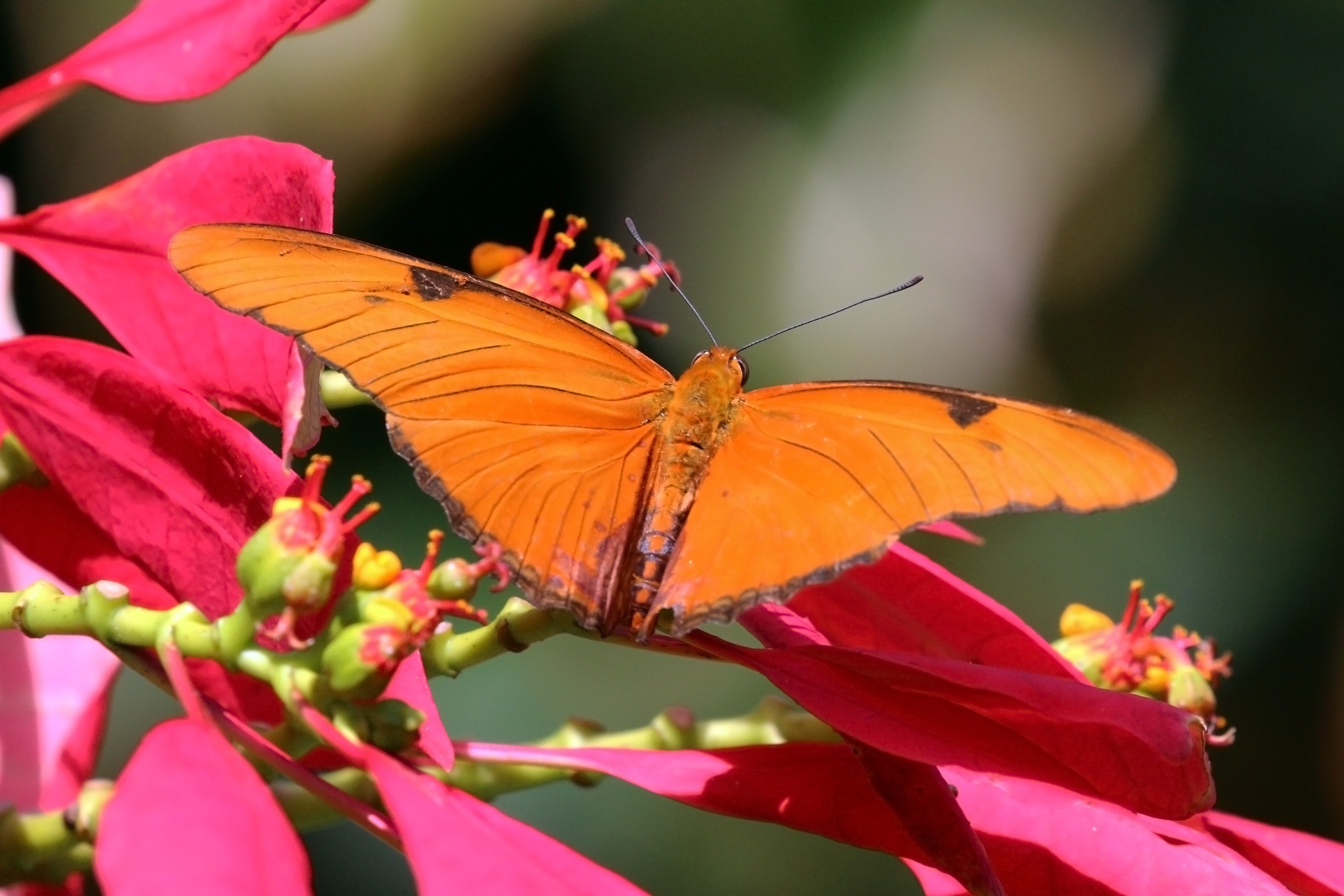
Julia

- Anaea troglodyta cubana (Fabricius, 1775) – Cuban red leaf butterfly, troglodyte
- Anartia jatrophae jamaicensis (Möshler, 1886) – white peacock
- Euptoieta hegesia hegesia (Cramer, 1779)
- Hamadryas amphichloe (Boisduval, 1870) – Haitian cracker, click butterfly
- Hypolimnas misippus (Linnaeus, 1764) – mimic
- Junonia evarete (Cramer, 1779) – mangrove buckeye
- Junonia genoveva (Cramer, 1780) – Caribbean buckeye, tropical buckeye
- Marpesia chiron (Fabricius, 1775) – many-banded daggerwing
- Marpesia eleuchea (Hübner, 1818) – Antillean ruddy daggerwing
- Memphis verticordia danielana (Witt, 1972) – Cayman brown leaf butterfly (Es)
- Phyciodes phaon (W.H.Edwards, 1864) – Cayman crescent spot
- Phyciodes tharos (Drury, [1773])
- Siproeta stelenes bilagiata (Fruhstorfer, 1907) – malachite
- Vanessa cardui (Linnaeus, 1758) – painted lady

=== Danainae ===
- Danaus eresimus tethys (Cramer, 1777) – soldier
- Danaus gilippus berenice (Cramer, 1775) – queen
- Danaus plexippus (Linnaeus, 1758) – monarch

=== Satyrinae ===
- Calisto herophile (Hübner, 1823) – ringlet

=== Heliconiinae ===
- Agraulis vanillae insularis (Maynard, 1889) – Gulf fritillary
- Dryas iulia zoe (Miller & Steinhauser, 1992) – Julia, flambeau (Es)
- Heliconius charitonius (Linnaeus, 1767) – zebra

== Lycaenidae ==
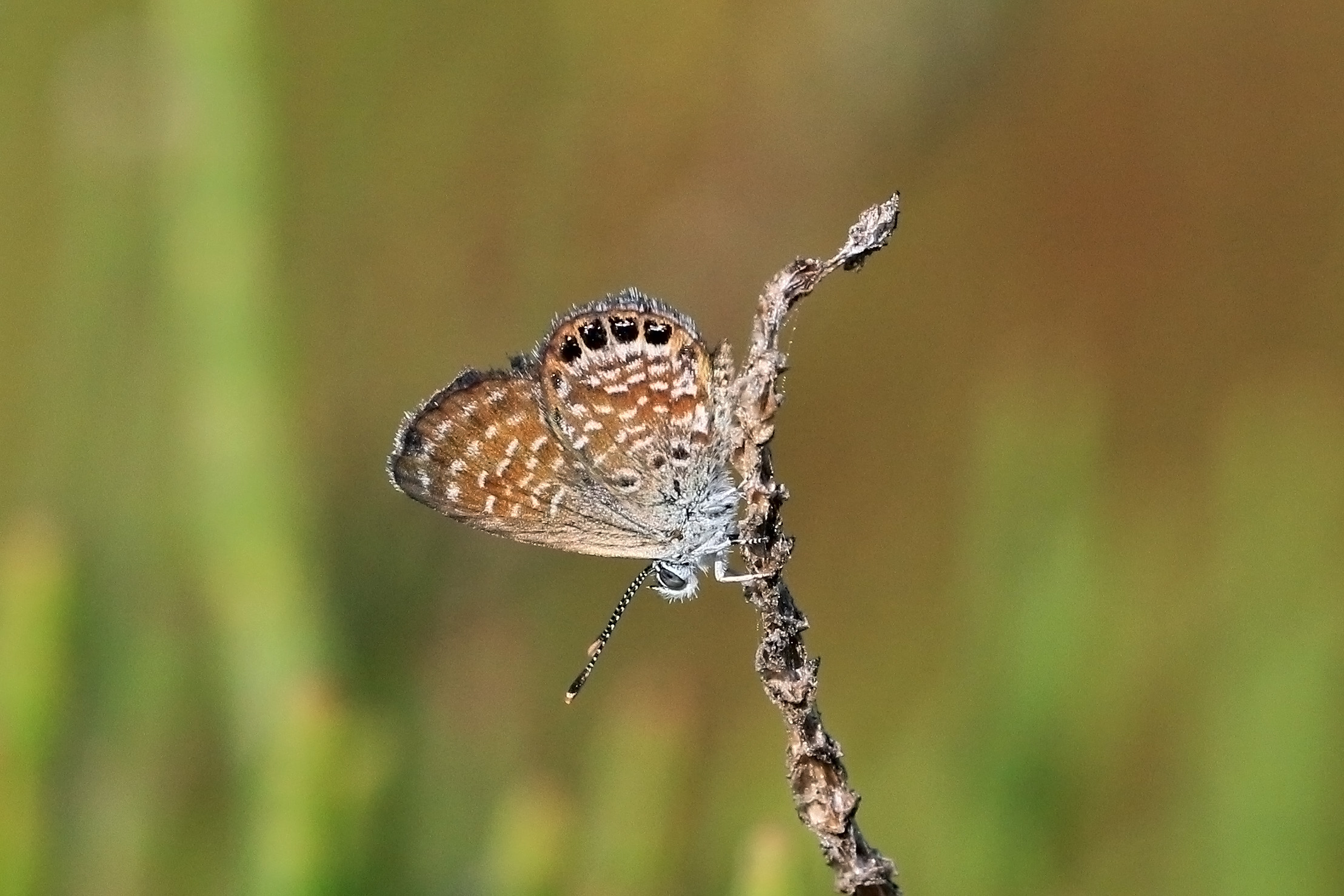
Western pygmy blue

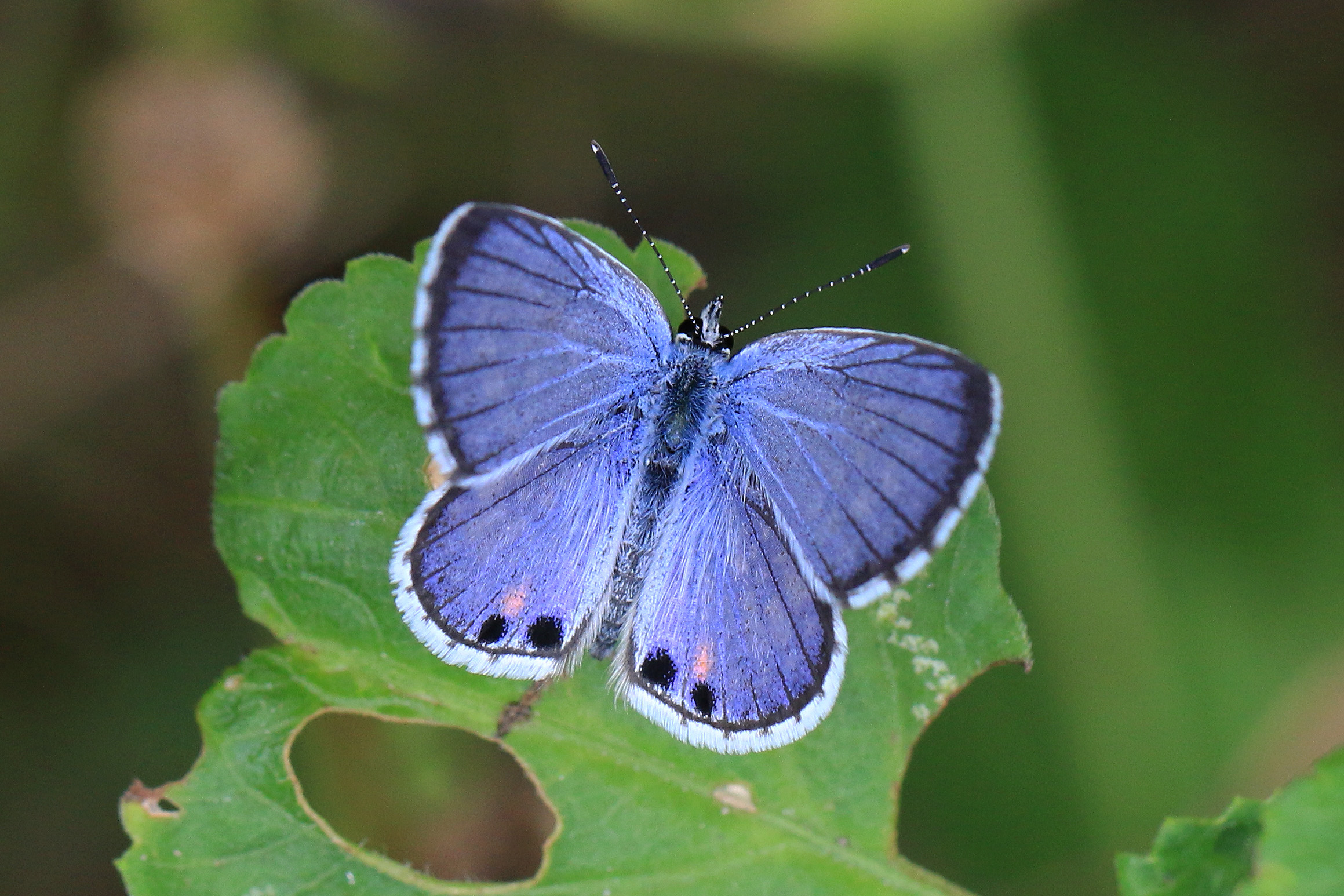
Lucas's blue

- Brephidium exilis thompsoni (Carpenter & Lewis, 1943) – pygmy blue (Es)
- Chlorostrymon maesites (Henrrich-Schäffer, 1864) – amethyst hairstreak
- Cyclargus ammon erembis Nabokov, 1948 – Lucas's blue (Es)
- Electrostrymon angelia (Hewitson, 1874) – fulvous hairstreak
- Eumaeus atala (Poey, 1832) – Atala
- Hemiargus hanno filenus (Poey, 1832) – Hanno blue
- Leptoptes cassius theonus (Lucas, 1857) – Cassius blue
- Strymon acis (Drury, 1773) – Drury's hairstreak
- Strymon istapa (Reakirt, 1867) – Hewitson's hairstreak
- Strymon martialis (Henrrich-Schäffer, 1865) – Cuban grey hairstreak

== Hesperiidae ==
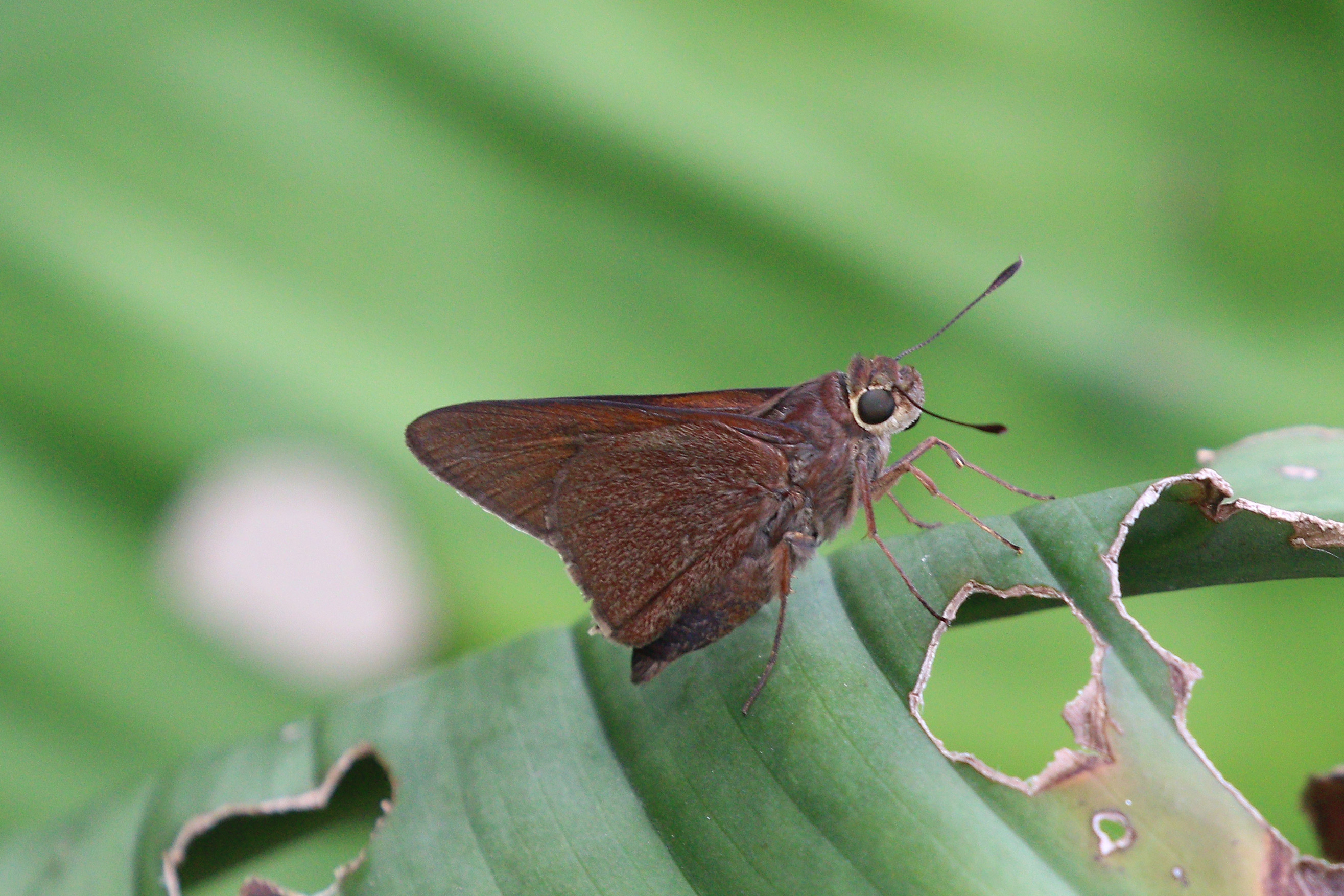
Monk

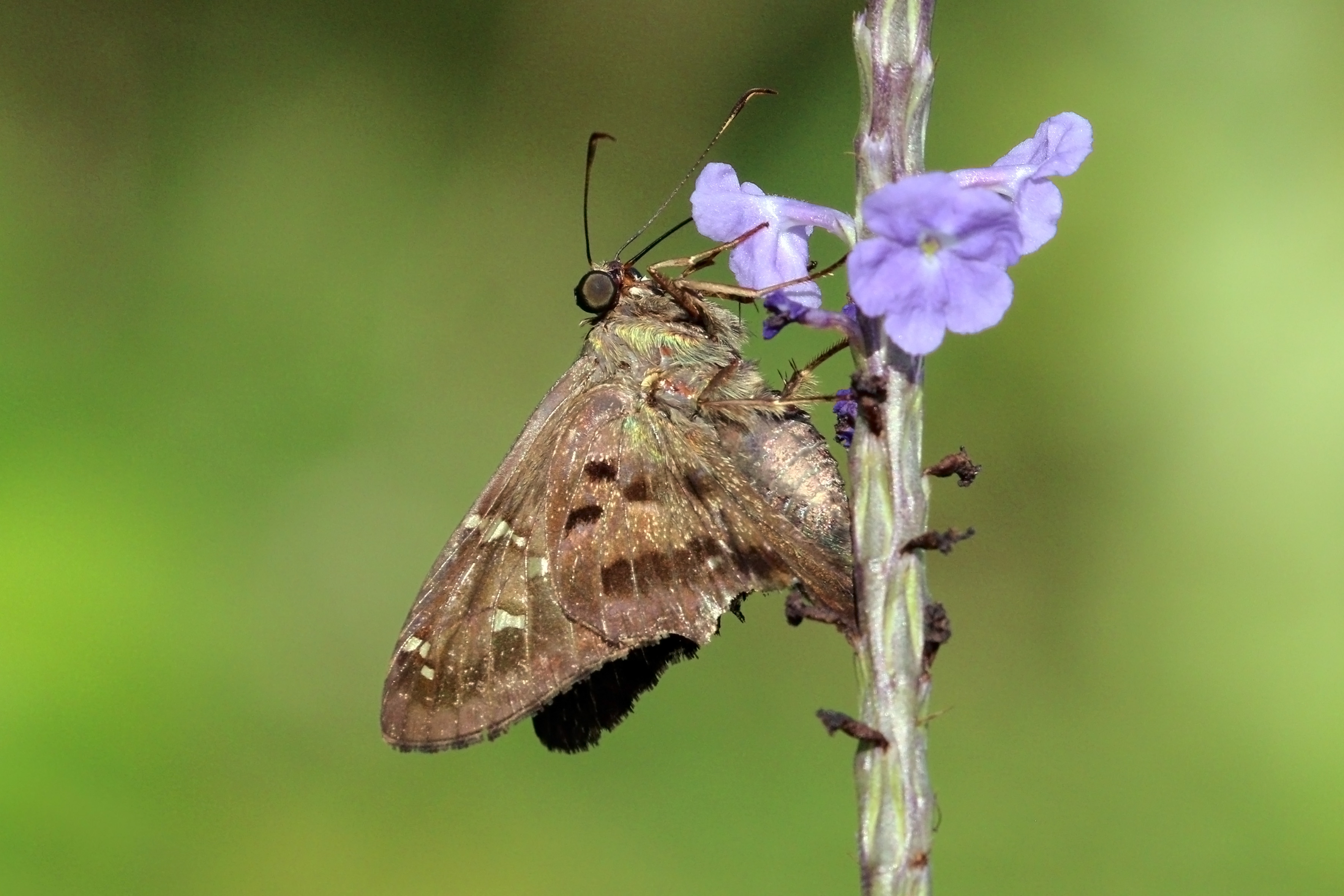
Long-tailed skipper

- Asbolis capucinus (Lucas, 1857) – monk
- Atalopedes mesogramma (Latreille, 1824) – striped skipper
- Calpodes ethlius (Stoll, 1782) – canna skipper, Brazilian skipper
- Cymaenes tripuntus (Henrrich-Schäffer, 1865) – three spot skipper
- Hylephila phyleus (Drury, 1773) – fiery skipper
- Panoquina lucas (Fabricius, 1793) – purple-washed skipper, sugar cane skipper
- Panoquina ocala (W. H. Edwards, 1863) – Ocala skipper
- Panoquina panoquinoides (Skinner, 1891) – obscure skipper
- Phocides pigmalion batabano (Lucas, 1857) – mangrove skipper
- Urbanus dorantes santiago (Lucas, 1857) – Dorantes skipper
- Urbanus proteus domingo (Scudder, 1872) – long-tailed skipper
