= Little Farmer's Cay =

Island in the Bahamas

- Location within Bahamas

Geography
- Location: Atlantic Ocean
- Coordinates: 23.9580°N 76.3224°W
- Archipelago: Lucayan Archipelago

Administration
- Bahamas

Demographics
- Population: 66 (2010)

Additional information
- Time zone: EST (UTC-5)
  - Summer (DST): EDT (UTC-4)
- ISO code: BS-BP

Little Farmer's Cay is an island in the Bahamas, located in the district of Black Point. The island had a population of 66 at the 2010 census.

Each year, the island hosts the Farmer's Cay First Friday in February Festival, a sailing regatta.

Butterfly species found on the island include the fulvous hairstreak (Electrostrymon angelia), scrub hairstreak (Strymon columella), martial hairstreak (Strymon martialis), long-tailed skipper (Urbanus proteus), broken dash skipper (Wallengrenia misera) and the Gulf fritillary (Agraulis vanillae insularis).
