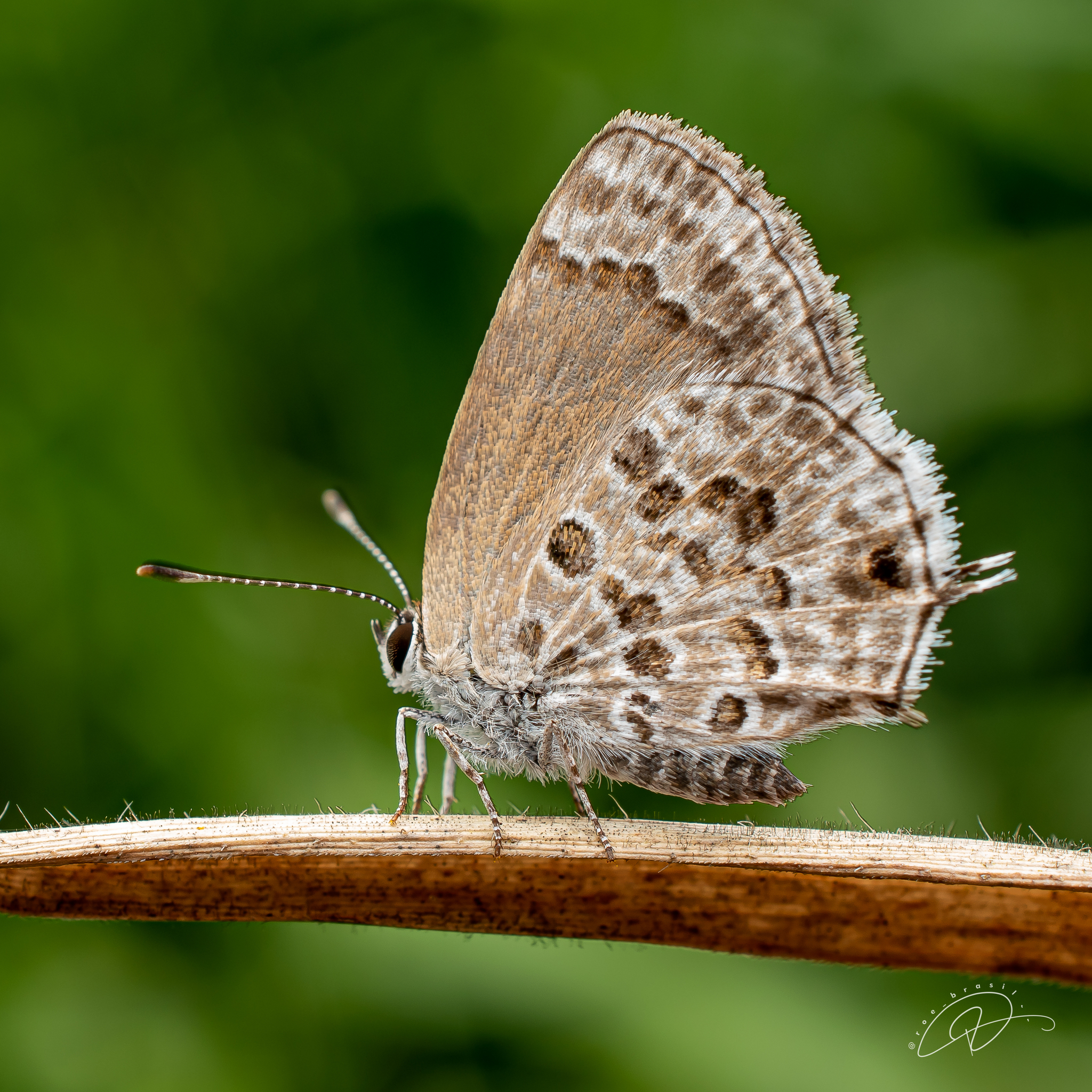
- adult from Brazil

Scientific classification
- Kingdom: Animalia
- Phylum: Arthropoda
- Class: Insecta
- Order: Lepidoptera
- Family: Lycaenidae
- Genus: Strymon
- Species: S. astiocha

Binomial name
- Strymon astiocha (Prittwitz, 1865)

Synonyms
- Thecla astiocha Prittwitz, 1865; Thecla faunalia Hewitson, 1868; Thecla deborrei Capronnier, 1874; Strymon halos Austin & Johnson, 1997; Strymon conspergus Austin & Johnson, 1997

= Strymon astiocha =

Gray-spotted Scrub-Hairstreak

Species of butterfly

Strymon astiocha is a butterfly of the family Lycaenidae. It is found in Brazil, including the states of Rio de Janeiro and Rondônia.

== Description ==
The species exhibits sexual dimorphism in size, with males being about the size of Alexis. The wingspan is similar to other Strymon species in the region. The forewings are white with brown coloration on the body, breast, and a very short tail-like projection. The antennae are black with white bands.

The hindwings have distinctive markings including a black line in front of the fringes, from which individual dark stripes extend into the wing margins. Above this line is a whitish line on the posterior part of the hindwings, with 2 to 3 large black spots located right and left from the hindmost branch of the median vein.

The underside of the forewings shows brownish-gray coloration from the base for about two-thirds of the wing length. The wing pattern includes a brown shadow, a series of small dark-brown crescent-shaped spots, a white zigzag line with gray filling, a series of gray spots, a fine dark line, and white and gray checkered fringes. The hindwings are white with many gray-brown spots and two crossbands of brown and black-bordered small spots. The wing base is dark-spotted and dusty, with a black spot above the tail-like projection.

A fine dark line appears in front of the black and white checkered fringes.

== Taxonomy ==
The species was originally described as Thecla astiocha by Otto von Prittwitz in 1865. It has since been transferred to the genus Strymon and has several junior synonyms, including Thecla faunalia Hewitson, 1868 and Thecla deborrei Capronnier, 1874.

== Distribution ==
S. astiocha is found in Brazil, with confirmed records from Rio de Janeiro and Rondônia states.
