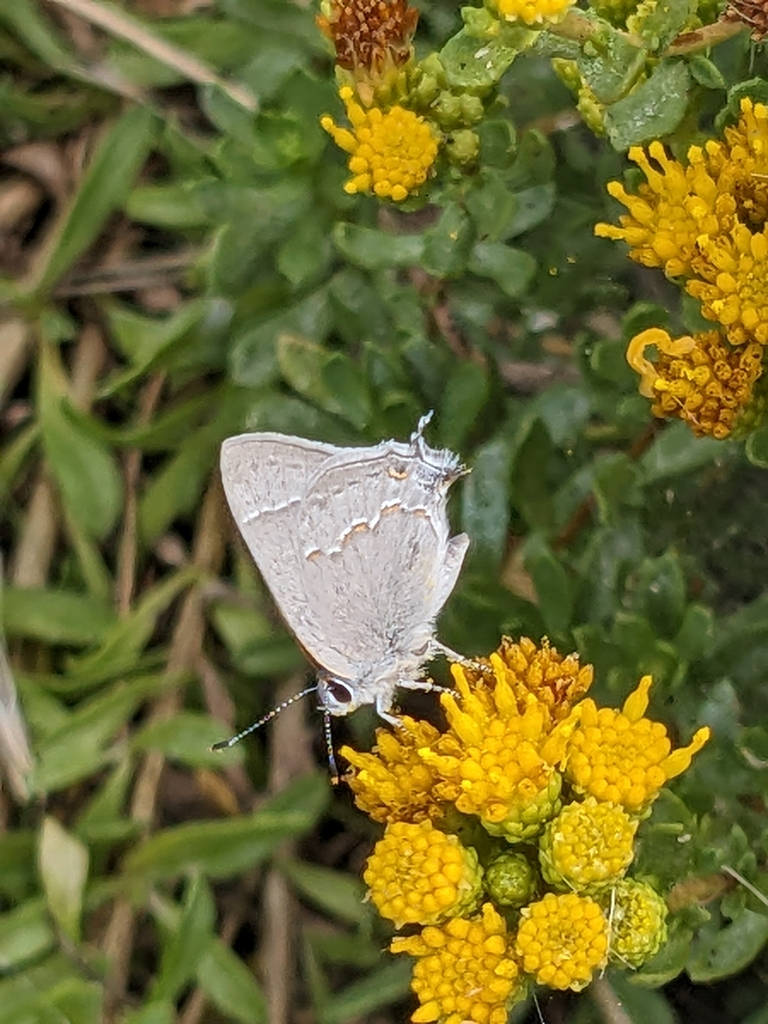

Conservation status
- Vulnerable (IUCN 2.3)

Scientific classification
- Kingdom: Animalia
- Phylum: Arthropoda
- Class: Insecta
- Order: Lepidoptera
- Family: Lycaenidae
- Genus: Strymon
- Species: S. avalona

Binomial name
- Strymon avalona (Wright, 1905)

= Avalon hairstreak =

Species of butterfly

The Avalon hairstreak (Strymon avalona) is a species of butterfly in the family Lycaenidae.

It is endemic to Santa Catalina Island, off the coast of Southern California in the United States.
