= Adopaeoides =

Scientific classification
- Kingdom: Animalia
- Phylum: Arthropoda
- Class: Insecta
- Order: Lepidoptera
- Family: Hesperiidae
- Subtribe: Apaustina
- Genus: Adopaeoides; Godman, 1900

Genus of butterflies

Adopaeoides is a genus of butterflies in the grass skipper subfamily Hesperiinae. It is found in Mexico and the south-western United States.

Species include:

- Adopaeoides bistriata Godman, 1900 (Mexico)
- Adopaeoides prittwitzi (Plötz, 1884) – sunrise skipper (Mexico, south-western USA)
