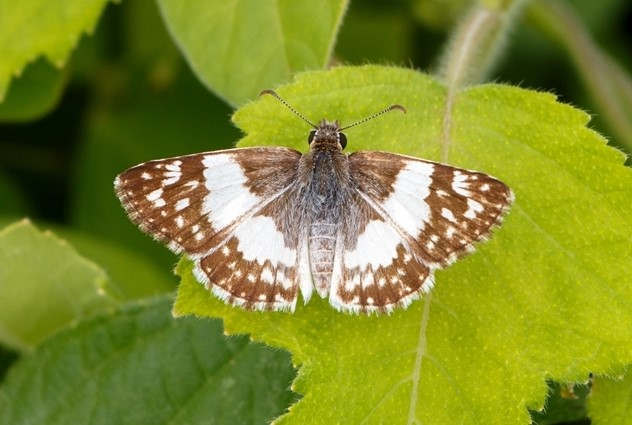

Scientific classification
- Kingdom: Animalia
- Phylum: Arthropoda
- Clade: Pancrustacea
- Class: Insecta
- Order: Lepidoptera
- Family: Hesperiidae
- Genus: Heliopyrgus
- Species: H. domicella

Binomial name
- Heliopyrgus domicella (Erichson, 1849)

Synonyms
- Heliopetes domicella

= Heliopyrgus domicella =

Species of butterfly

Heliopyrgus domicella, or Erichson's white-skipper, is a species of spread-wing skipper in the butterfly family Hesperiidae. It is found in North America.

== Subspecies ==
These three subspecies belong to the species Heliopyrgus domicella:

- Heliopyrgus domicella domicella (Erichson, 1849)
- Heliopyrgus domicella margarita Bell, 1937
- Heliopyrgus domicella willi Plötz, 1884
