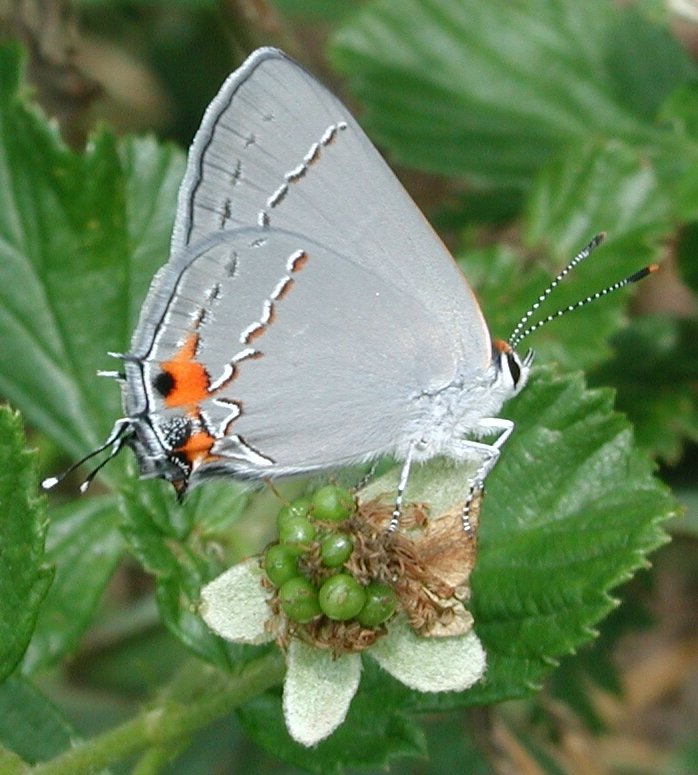
- Strymon melinus

Scientific classification
- Domain: Eukaryota
- Kingdom: Animalia
- Phylum: Arthropoda
- Class: Insecta
- Order: Lepidoptera
- Family: Lycaenidae
- Subfamily: Theclinae
- Tribe: Eumaeini
- Genus: Strymon; Hübner, 1818

Species
- See text

Synonyms
- Eiseliana Toledo, 1978; Callipareus Scudder, 1872; Callicista Grote, 1873; Uranotes Scudder, 1876; Heoda Johnson, L. Miller & Herrera, 1992

= Strymon (butterfly) =

Butterfly genus in family Lycaenidae

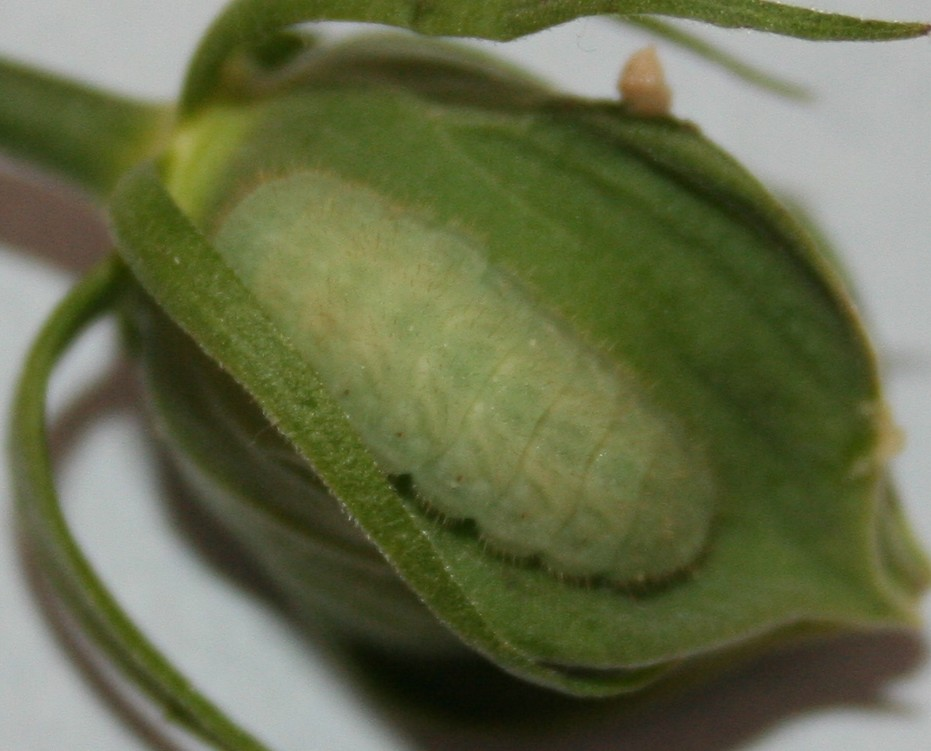
Strymon melinus larva

Strymon is a genus of scrub hairstreak butterflies in the family Lycaenidae. It is a highly distinct lineage in the tribe Eumaeini, and was at one time even treated as a monotypic tribe Strymonini. The species of the genus are found in the Nearctic, the Palearctic and the Neotropical realms.

== List of species ==
- Strymon acis
- Strymon aeroides
- Strymon albata
- Strymon alea
- Strymon aliparops
- Strymon amphyporphyra
- Strymon andrewi
- Strymon arola
- Strymon astiocha
- Strymon atrofasciata
- Strymon avalona
- Strymon baptistorum
- Strymon basalides
- Strymon basilides
- Strymon bazochii
- Strymon bebrycia
- Strymon borus
- Strymon bubastus
- Strymon buchholzi
- Strymon caryaevorus
- Strymon cestri
- Strymon chlorophora
- Strymon clarionensis
- Strymon columella
- Strymon coolinensis
- Strymon coronos
- Strymon crambusa
- Strymon crossoea
- Strymon cyanofusca
- Strymon cycnus
- Strymon daraba
- Strymon desertorum
- Strymon echion
- Strymon falacer
- Strymon faunalia
- Strymon favonius
- Strymon fentoni
- Strymon flavaria
- Strymon fletcheri
- Strymon franki
- Strymon gerhardi
- Strymon godarti
- Strymon golbachi
- Strymon humuli
- Strymon hyperici
- Strymon ilicis
- Strymon istapa
- Strymon lacyi
- Strymon lariyojoa
- Strymon limenia
- Strymon liparops
- Strymon lorrainea
- Strymon lynceus
- Strymon martialis
- Strymon maura
- Strymon melinus
- Strymon montanensis
- Strymon mulucha
- Strymon nicolayi
- Strymon obsoleta
- Strymon pan
- Strymon peristictos
- Strymon provo
- Strymon pruina
- Strymon pruni
- Strymon rhaptos
- Strymon rufofusca
- Strymon serapio
- Strymon setonia
- Strymon silenus non Fabricius, 1775
- Strymon souhegan
- Strymon spini
- Strymon strigosa
- Strymon yojoa
- Strymon ziba
