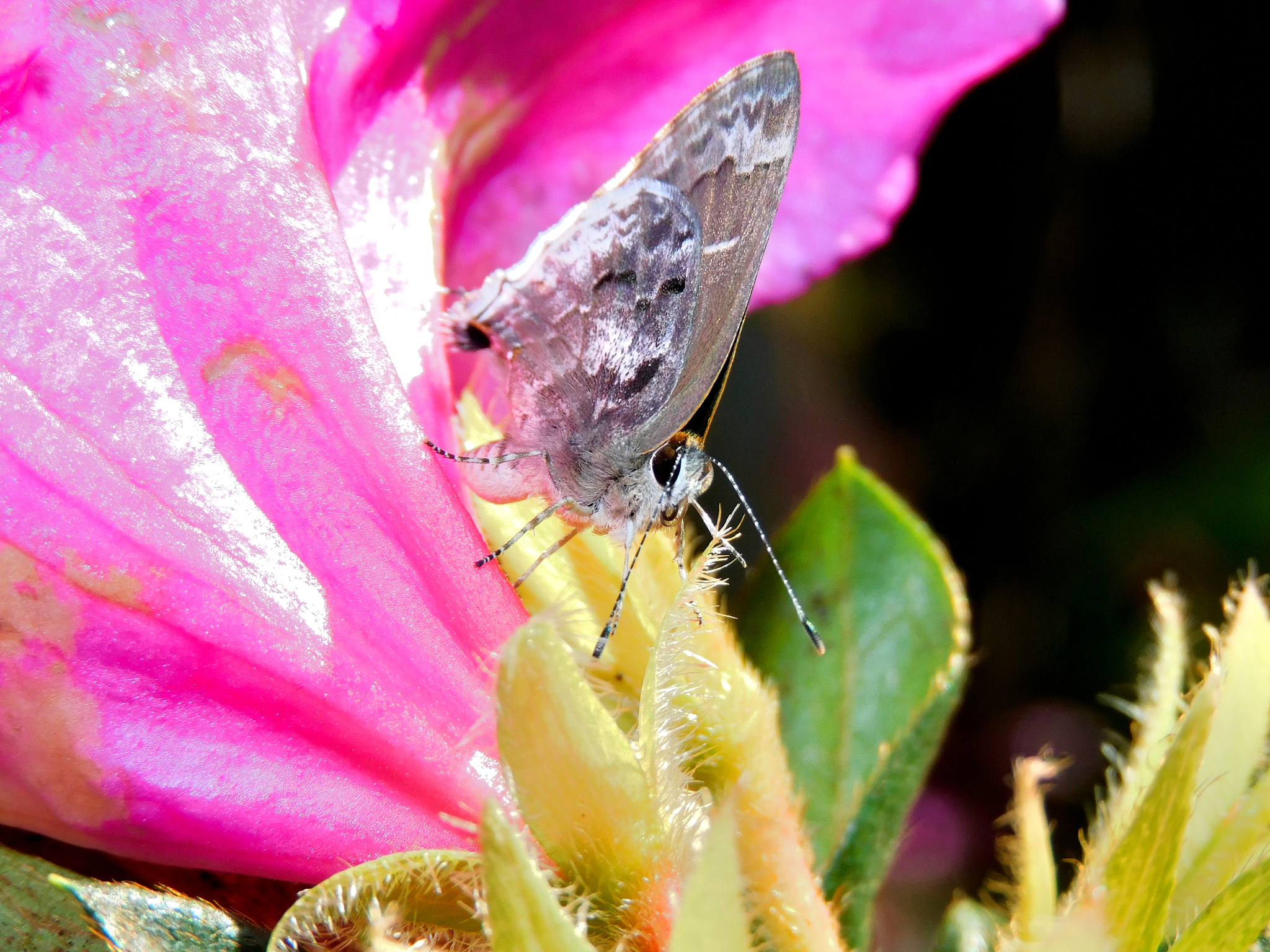

Scientific classification
- Domain: Eukaryota
- Kingdom: Animalia
- Phylum: Arthropoda
- Class: Insecta
- Order: Lepidoptera
- Family: Lycaenidae
- Genus: Strymon
- Species: S. mulucha

Binomial name
- Strymon mulucha (Hewitson, 1867)

Synonyms
- Thecla mulucha Hewitson, 1867; Tmolus invisus Butler & H. Druce, 1872; Strymon necjebus Le Crom & Johnson, 1997; Strymon novasignum Austin & Johnson, 1997; Strymon clavus Austin & Johnson, 1997; Strymon implexus Austin & Johnson, 1997; Strymon inmirum Austin & Johnson, 1997; Strymon incanus Austin & Johnson, 1997

= Strymon mulucha =

Species of butterfly

Strymon mulucha is a butterfly of the family Lycaenidae. It was described by William Chapman Hewitson in 1867. It is found in Guatemala, Costa Rica, the Amazon region of Brazil, Venezuela and Colombia.
