= Strymon crambusa =

Scientific classification
- Kingdom: Animalia
- Phylum: Arthropoda
- Clade: Pancrustacea
- Class: Insecta
- Order: Lepidoptera
- Family: Lycaenidae
- Genus: Strymon
- Species: S. crambusa

Binomial name
- Strymon crambusa (Hewitson, 1874)

Synonyms
- Thecla crambusa Hewitson, 1874

Species of butterfly

Figs. 678, 679 ♂. Strymon crambusa (Hewitson, 1874)

Strymon crambusa is a butterfly of the family Lycaenidae. It was described by William Chapman Hewitson in 1874. It is found in Brazil and Bolivia.
