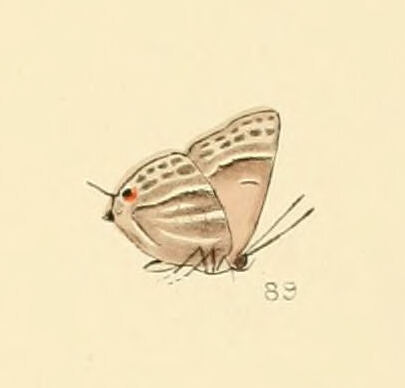
- Strymon daraba, 1867 drawing

Scientific classification
- Kingdom: Animalia
- Phylum: Arthropoda
- Clade: Pancrustacea
- Class: Insecta
- Order: Lepidoptera
- Family: Lycaenidae
- Genus: Strymon
- Species: S. daraba

Binomial name
- Strymon daraba (Hewitson, 1867)

Synonyms
- Thecla daraba Hewitson, 1867; Thecla tyleri Dyar, 1913; Strymon tyleri

= Strymon daraba =

Species of butterfly

Strymon daraba is a butterfly of the family Lycaenidae. It was described by William Chapman Hewitson in 1867. It is found in Ecuador and Peru.
