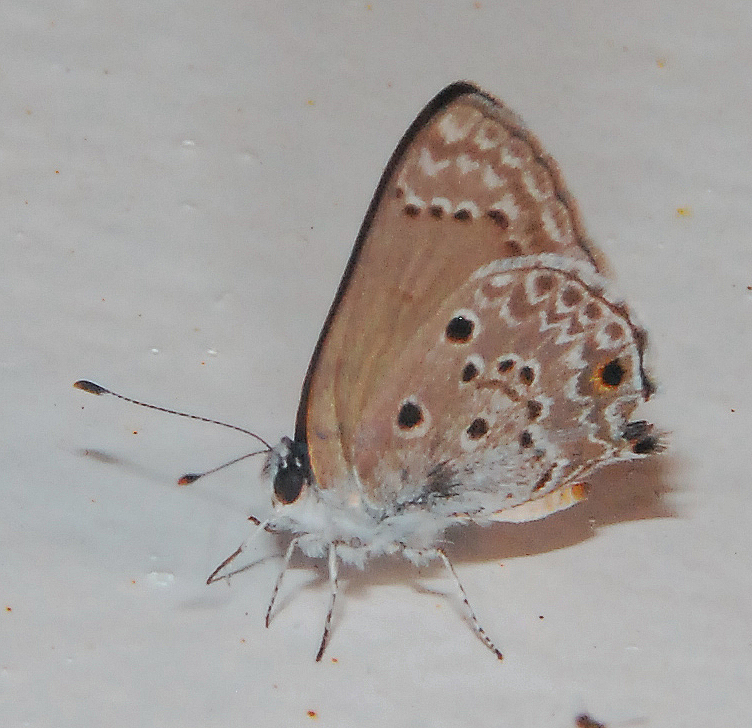

Scientific classification
- Domain: Eukaryota
- Kingdom: Animalia
- Phylum: Arthropoda
- Class: Insecta
- Order: Lepidoptera
- Family: Lycaenidae
- Genus: Strymon
- Species: S. bubastus

Binomial name
- Strymon bubastus (Stoll, 1780)

Synonyms
- Papilio bubastus Stoll, [1780]; Papilio minereus Fabricius, 1787; Thecla salona Hewitson, 1868; Thecla sapota Hewitson, 1877; Thecla cestri peruensis Dufrane, 1939; Strymon vividus Le Crom & Johnson, 1997; Strymon sapota; Thecla bubastus ponce Comstock & Huntington, 1943; Thecla ponce Comstock & Huntington, 1943

= Strymon bubastus =

Species of butterfly

Strymon bubastus, the disjunct scrub-hairstreak or Bubastus hairstreak, is a butterfly of the family Lycaenidae. It was described by Caspar Stoll in 1780. It is found in Puerto Rico, Venezuela, Colombia, Peru, Dominica and Grenada.

Host plants include Phyla nodiflora and Waltheria ovata in Chile.

== Subspecies ==
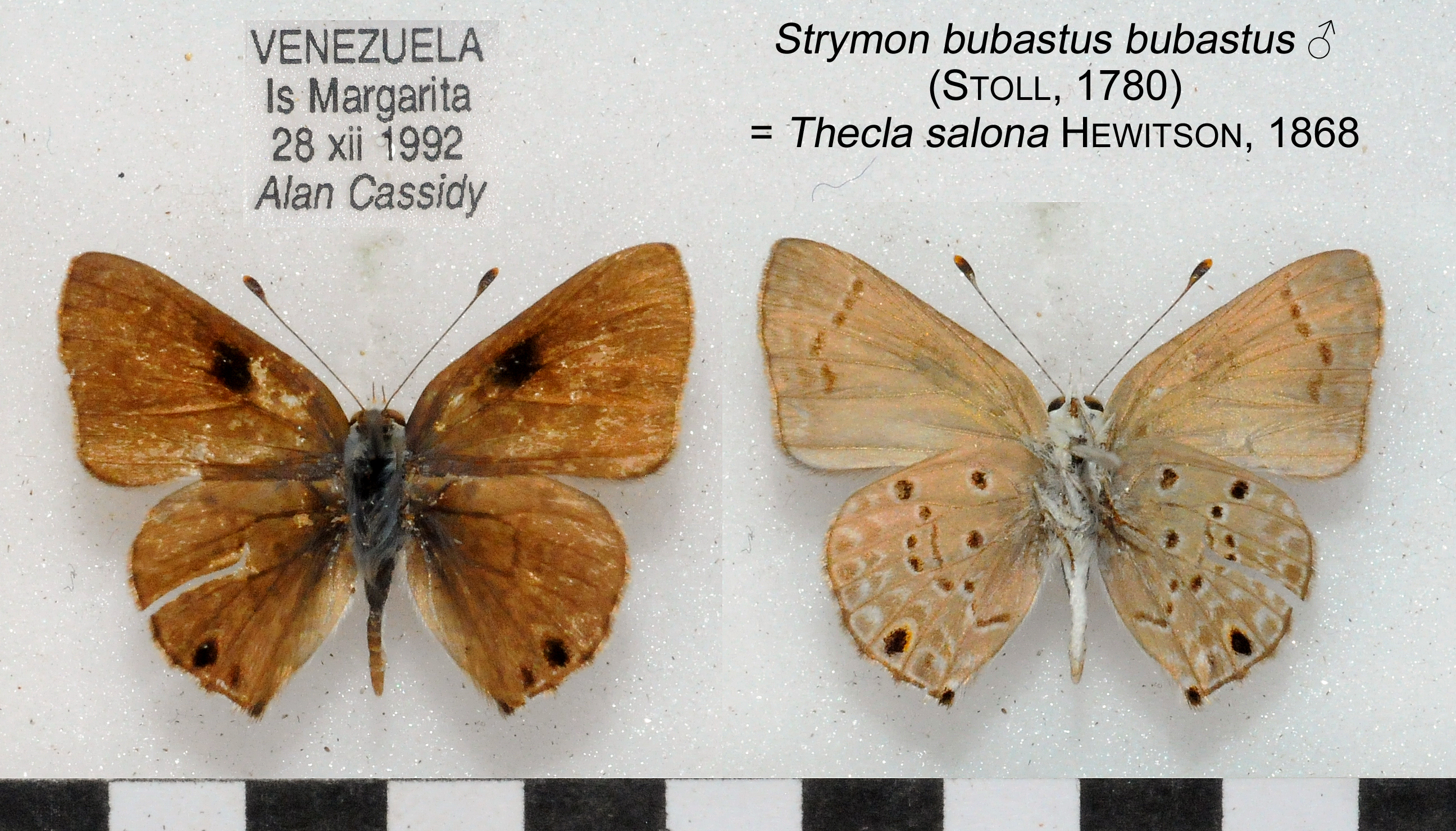
Strymon Bubastus Bubastus found in Venezuela

- Strymon bubastus bubastus
- Strymon bubastus ponce (Comstock & Huntington, 1943) (Antilles)
