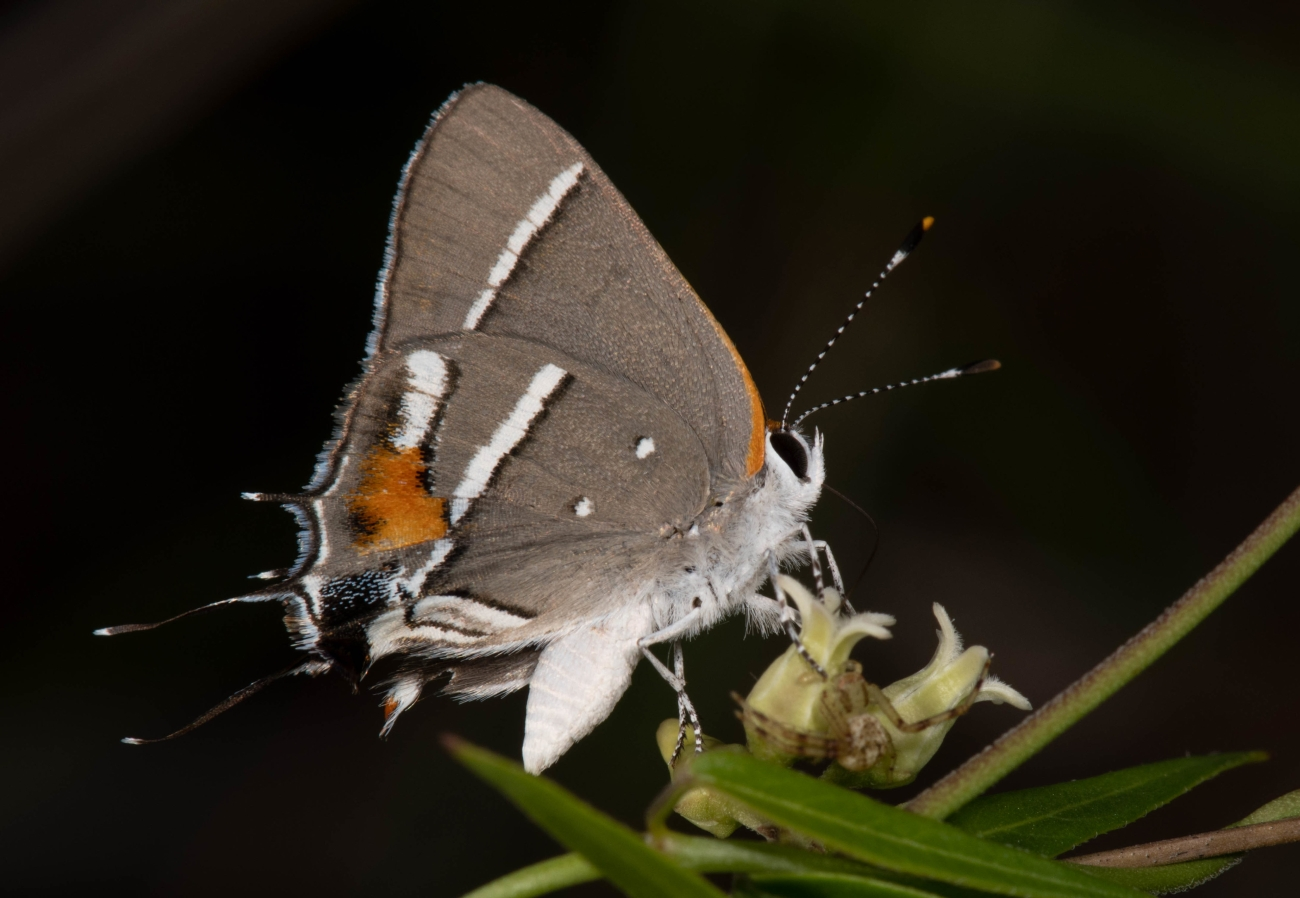

Conservation status
- Apparently Secure (NatureServe)

Scientific classification
- Domain: Eukaryota
- Kingdom: Animalia
- Phylum: Arthropoda
- Class: Insecta
- Order: Lepidoptera
- Family: Lycaenidae
- Genus: Strymon
- Species: S. acis

Binomial name
- Strymon acis (Drury, 1773)

Synonyms
- Papilio acis Drury, [1773]; Thecla acis gossei Comstock & Huntington, 1943; Thecla acis petioni Comstock & Huntington, 1943; Strymon acis armouri Clench, 1943; Strymon acis leucosticha Clench, 1992; Thecla acis bartrami Comstock & Huntington, 1943; Thecla acis casasi Comstock & Huntington, 1943; Papilio mars Fabricius, 1776

= Strymon acis =

Species of butterfly

Strymon acis, the Bartram's scrub-hairstreak, is a butterfly of the family Lycaenidae. It is found in southern Florida and the West Indies. The habitat consists of openings in pine woods.

The subspecies S. a. bartrami, occurring in southern Florida, is listed as Endangered under the United States Endangered Species Act.

== Description ==
The wingspan is 22–29 mm. The upper side is dark gray. The underside of the wings is pale gray with white lines and contrasting thinner black lines. The hindwing has 1 long and 1 short tail. The underside is light gray. There is 2 white spots near the base of the wing. Eggs are laid singly of flower stalks of host plants. Young caterpillars eat the upper side of leaves, flowers, and fruit. Older caterpillars only eat leaves. There are between three and four flights in Florida between the months of February and November. The larvae feed on the flower buds and young fruits of Croton linearis. Adults feed on nectar from flowers of narrow-leafed croton and shepherd's needle.

== Subspecies ==
- Strymon acis acis
- Strymon acis bartrami (Comstock & Huntington, 1943) (southern Florida)
- Strymon acis casasi (Comstock & Huntington, 1943) (Cuba)
- Strymon acis mars (Fabricius, 1776)
