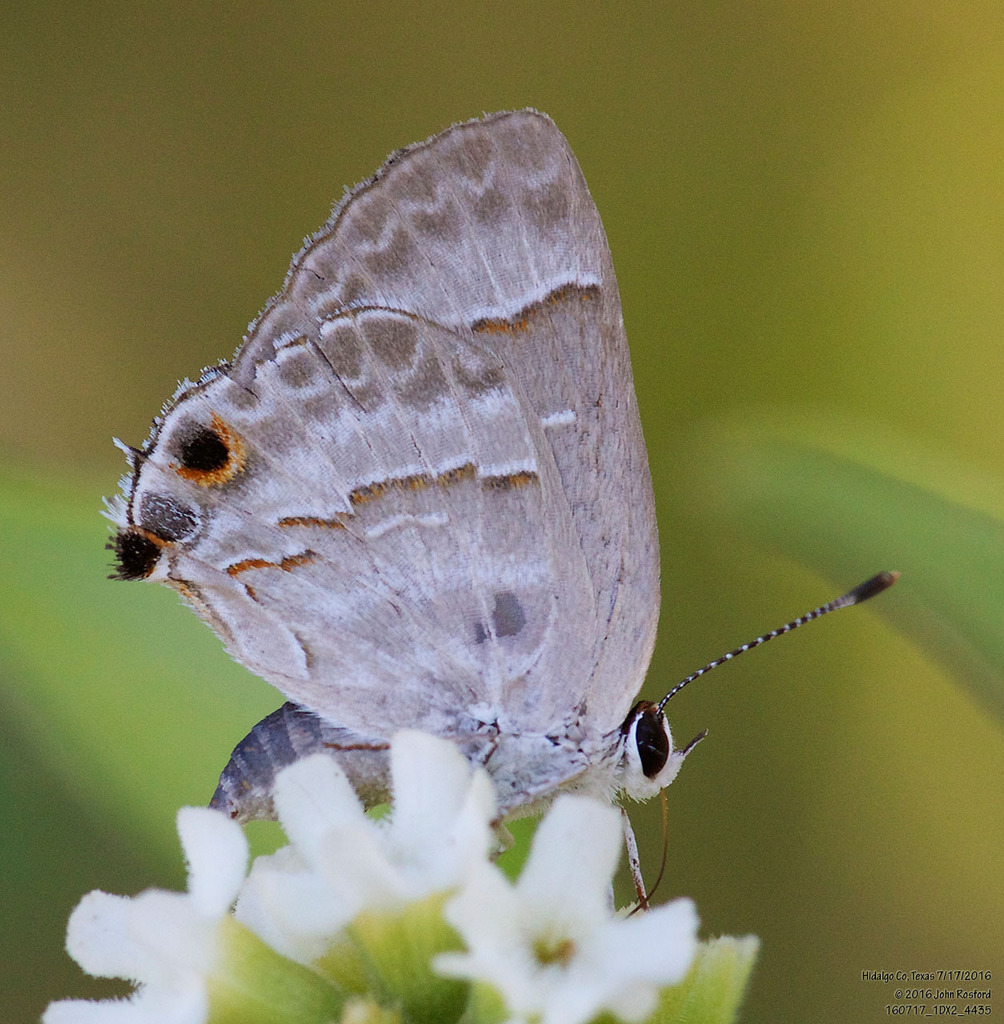

Scientific classification
- Kingdom: Animalia
- Phylum: Arthropoda
- Clade: Pancrustacea
- Class: Insecta
- Order: Lepidoptera
- Family: Lycaenidae
- Tribe: Eumaeini
- Genus: Strymon
- Species: S. yojoa

Binomial name
- Strymon yojoa (Reakirt, 1867)

= Strymon yojoa =

Species of butterfly

Strymon yojoa, the yojoa scrub-hairstreak, is a species of hairstreak in the butterfly family Lycaenidae.
