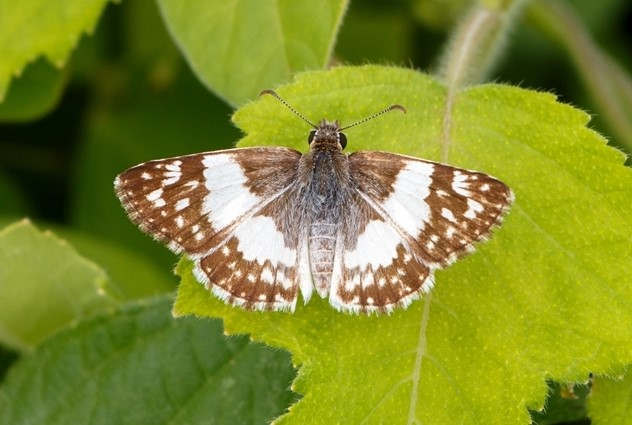
- Erichson's white-skipper (Heliopyrgus domicella ssp. domicella). Synonym of Heliopetes domicella ssp. domicella. Subspecies of insect

Scientific classification
- Kingdom: Animalia
- Phylum: Arthropoda
- Class: Insecta
- Order: Lepidoptera
- Family: Hesperiidae
- Subfamily: Pyrginae
- Genus: Heliopyrgus; Herrera, 1957

= Heliopyrgus =

Genus of butterflies

Heliopyrgus is a genus of skippers in the family Hesperiidae.
