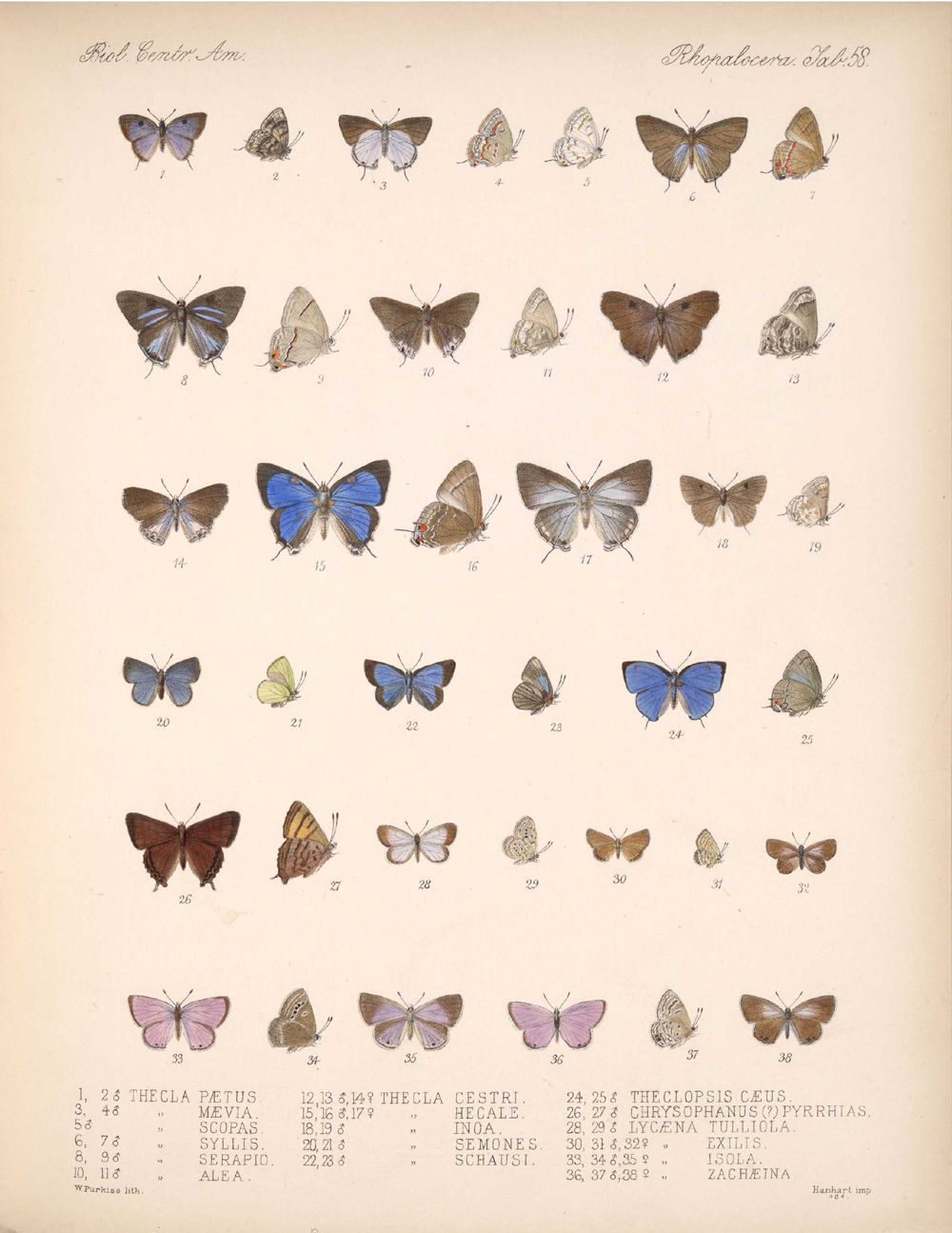

Scientific classification
- Domain: Eukaryota
- Kingdom: Animalia
- Phylum: Arthropoda
- Class: Insecta
- Order: Lepidoptera
- Family: Lycaenidae
- Genus: Strymon
- Species: S. alea

Binomial name
- Strymon alea (Godman & Salvin, [1887])

Synonyms
- Thecla alea Godman & Salvin, [1887]; Callicista laceyi Barnes & McDunnough, 1910; Strymon laceyi Barnes & McDunnough

= Strymon alea =

Species of butterfly

Strymon alea, the Alea hairstreak or Lacey's scrub-hairstreak, is a butterfly of the family Lycaenidae. It was described by Frederick DuCane Godman and Osbert Salvin in 1887. It is found from north-western Costa Rica through Mexico to central and southern Texas. The habitat consists of subtropical thorn scrub.

The wingspan is 19–29 mm. Adults feed on flower nectar.

The larvae feed on the buds and flowers and Bernardia myricaefolia.
