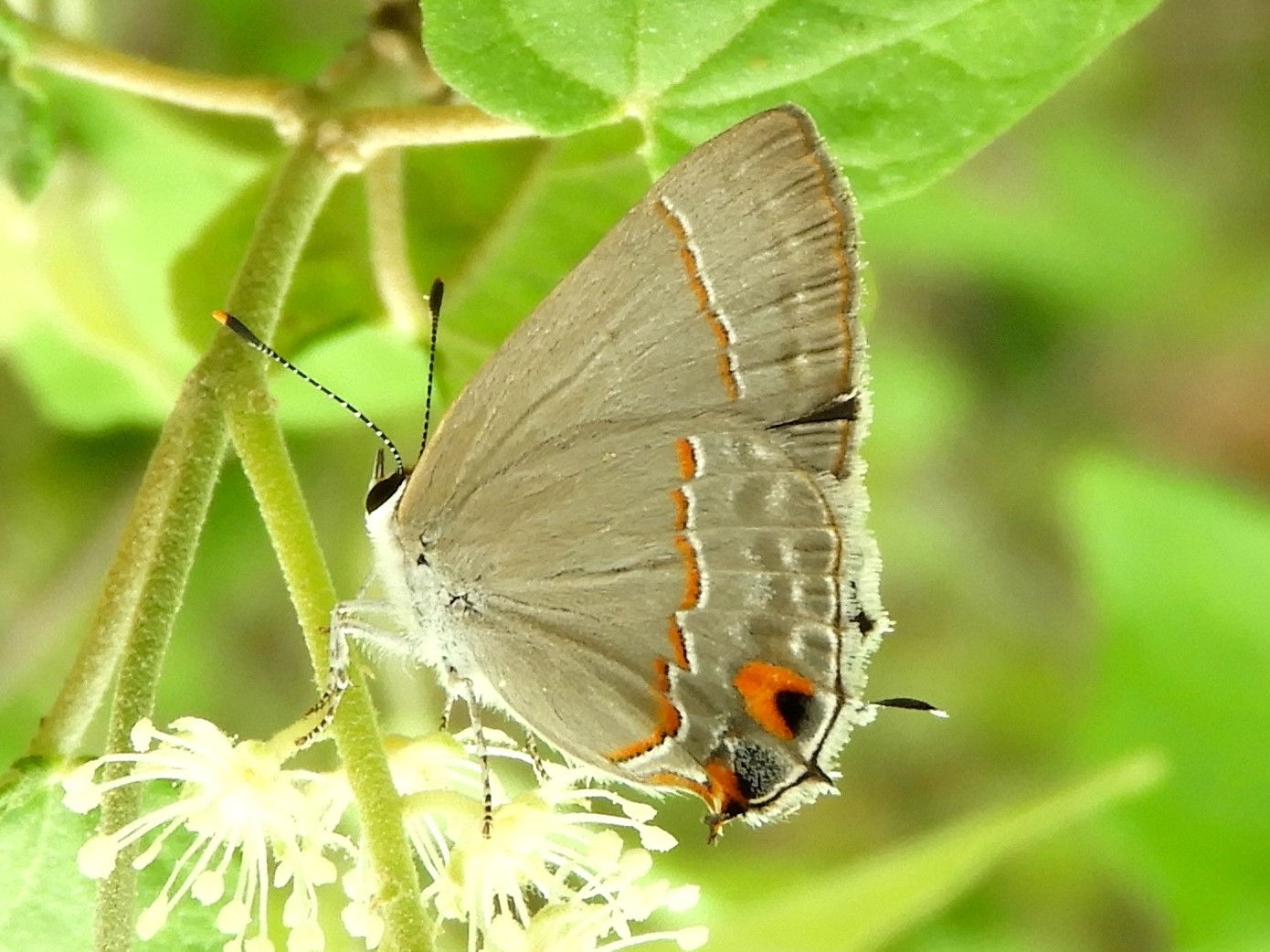

Scientific classification
- Kingdom: Animalia
- Phylum: Arthropoda
- Clade: Pancrustacea
- Class: Insecta
- Order: Lepidoptera
- Family: Lycaenidae
- Tribe: Eumaeini
- Genus: Strymon
- Species: S. bebrycia

Binomial name
- Strymon bebrycia (Hewitson, 1868)

= Strymon bebrycia =

Species of butterfly

Strymon bebrycia, the red-lined scrub-hairstreak, is a species of hairstreak in the butterfly family Lycaenidae. It is found in North America.

The MONA or Hodges number for Strymon bebrycia is 4339.
