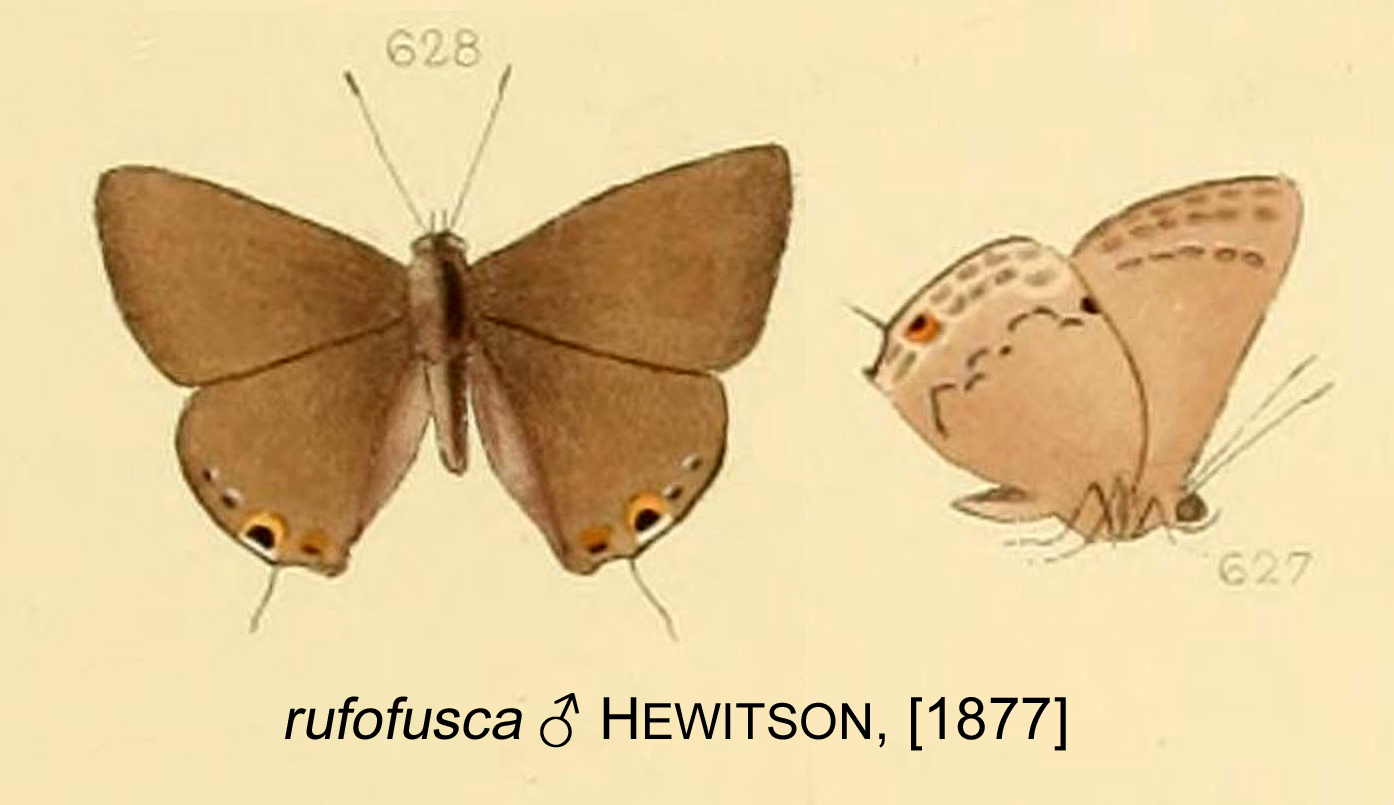

Scientific classification
- Kingdom: Animalia
- Phylum: Arthropoda
- Class: Insecta
- Order: Lepidoptera
- Family: Lycaenidae
- Tribe: Eumaeini
- Genus: Strymon
- Species: S. rufofusca

Binomial name
- Strymon rufofusca (Hewitson, 1877)

= Strymon rufofusca =

Species of butterfly

Strymon rufofusca, known generally as the red-crescent scrub-hairstreak or red-crescent hairstreak, is a species of hairstreak in the butterfly family Lycaenidae.

The MONA or Hodges number for Strymon rufofusca is 4338.
