= Adopaeoides prittwitzi =

Conservation status
- Vulnerable (NatureServe)

Scientific classification
- Kingdom: Animalia
- Phylum: Arthropoda
- Class: Insecta
- Order: Lepidoptera
- Family: Hesperiidae
- Genus: Adopaeoides
- Species: A. prittwitzi

Binomial name
- Adopaeoides prittwitzi (Plötz, 1884)

Species of butterfly

Adopaeoides prittwitzi, the sunrise skipper, is a species of grass skipper in the butterfly family Hesperiidae. It is found in Central America and North America.
