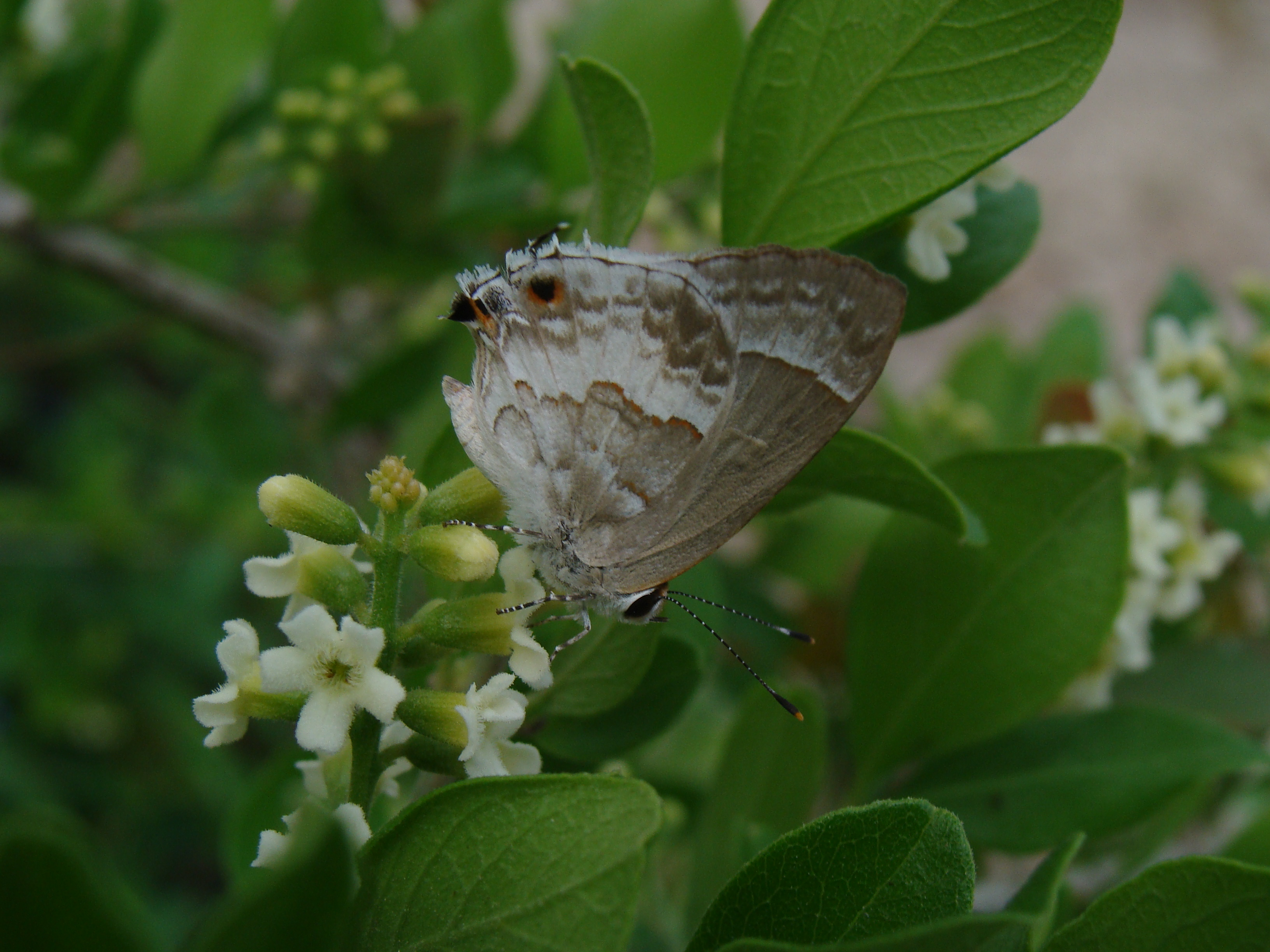

Scientific classification
- Domain: Eukaryota
- Kingdom: Animalia
- Phylum: Arthropoda
- Class: Insecta
- Order: Lepidoptera
- Family: Lycaenidae
- Genus: Strymon
- Species: S. albata

Binomial name
- Strymon albata (C. Felder & R. Felder, 1865)

Synonyms
- Strymon albatus; Thecla albata C. & R. Felder, 1865; Thecla sedecia Hewitson, 1874; Callicista albata

= Strymon albata =

Species of butterfly

Strymon albata, the white hairstreak, is a butterfly of the family Lycaenidae. It was described by Cajetan Felder and Rudolf Felder in 1865. It is found from southern Texas to Costa Rica, Colombia, Venezuela and Trinidad.

The wingspan is 29–35 mm. There are two generations in southern Texas with adults on wing from June to December. Adults are on wing year-round in the tropics. Adults feed on flower nectar of various flowers, including the blue boneset.

The larvae feed on the flower buds and young fruits of Abutilon incanum.
