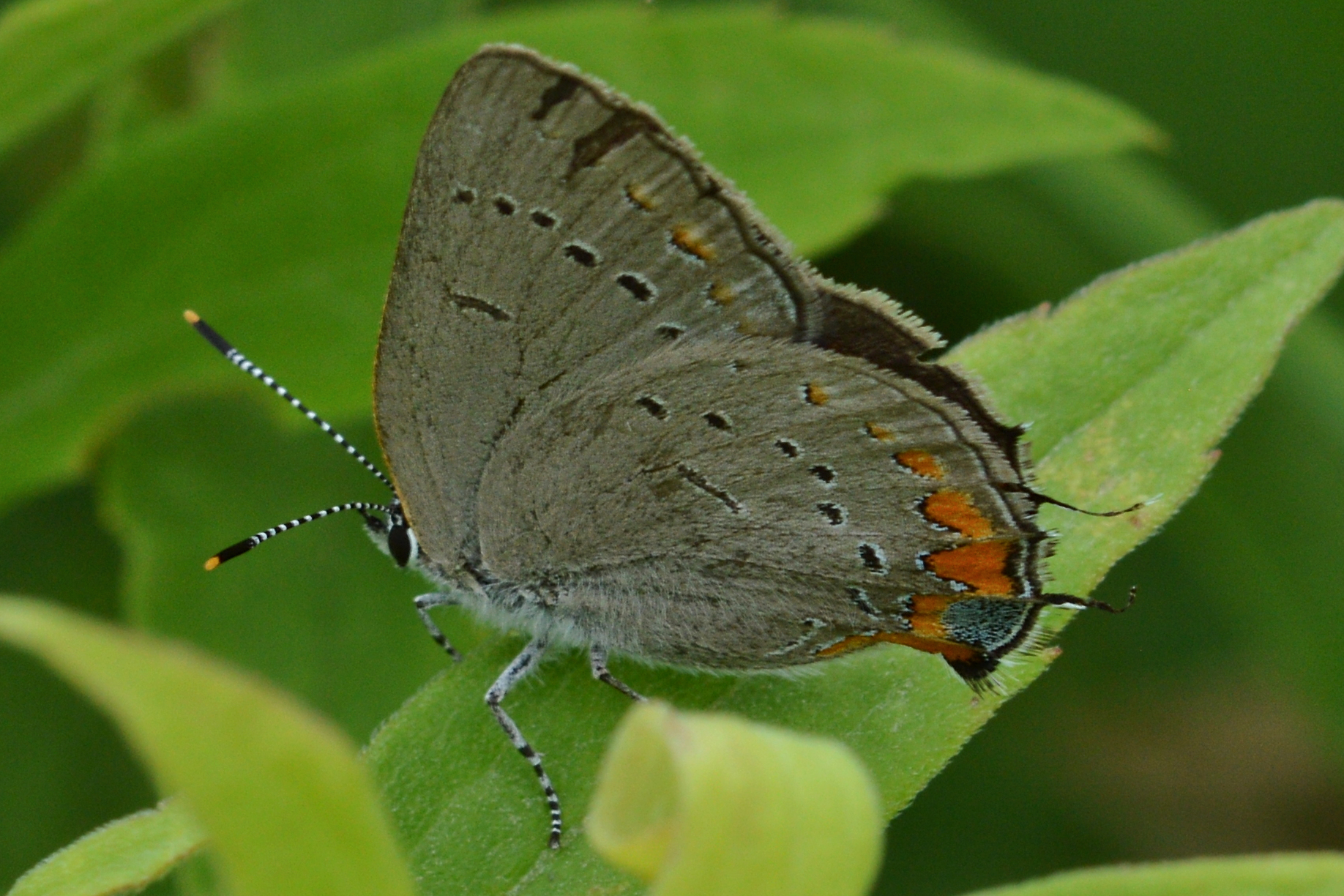
- Adult

Conservation status
- Secure (NatureServe)

Scientific classification
- Domain: Eukaryota
- Kingdom: Animalia
- Phylum: Arthropoda
- Class: Insecta
- Order: Lepidoptera
- Family: Lycaenidae
- Genus: Satyrium
- Species: S. acadica

Binomial name
- Satyrium acadica (W. H. Edwards, 1862)

Synonyms
- Strymon acadica; Thecla acadica; Satyrium acadicum; Strymon souhegan Whitney, 1868; Strymon muskoka Watson & Comstock, 1920; Strymon swetti Watson & Comstock, 1920; Strymon coolinensis Watson & Comstock, 1920; Strymon montanensis Watson & Comstock, 1920

= Satyrium acadica =

Species of butterfly

Satyrium acadica, the Acadian hairstreak, is a butterfly of the family Lycaenidae. It is found in North America from British Columbia east to Nova Scotia and south to Idaho, Colorado, the northern Midwest, Maryland, and New Jersey.

The wingspan is 29–38 mm. Like other hairstreaks, each hindwing has two tails near the tip. The shorter, upper tail is very short and often does not look at all like a tail. The upperside is brown grey, while the underside of the hindwings is grey. Adults are on wing from June to August in one generation per year. They feed on flower nectar of various flowers such as butterflyweed, milkweeds, and thistles.

The larvae feed on the leaves of Salix species, including S. nigra and S. sericea. The species overwinters as an egg.

== Subspecies ==
- Satyrium acadica acadica
- Satyrium acadica coolinense (Watson & Comstock, 1920)
- Satyrium acadica montanense (Watson & Comstock, 1920)
- Satyrium acadica watrini (Dufrane, 1939)
