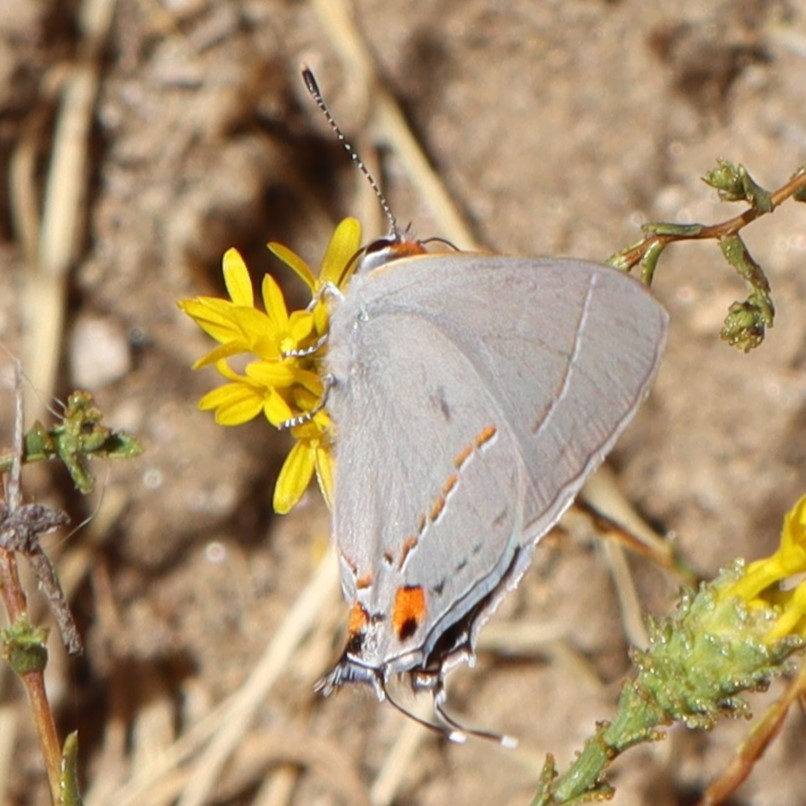

Conservation status
- Secure (NatureServe)

Scientific classification
- Kingdom: Animalia
- Phylum: Arthropoda
- Clade: Pancrustacea
- Class: Insecta
- Order: Lepidoptera
- Family: Lycaenidae
- Genus: Strymon
- Species: S. melinus

Binomial name
- Strymon melinus Hübner (1818)

Synonyms
- Thecla melinus

= Gray hairstreak =

Species of butterfly

The gray hairstreak (Strymon melinus) is also called the bean lycaenid or cotton square borer. It is a member of the Lycaenidae family, known as the gossamer-winged butterflies and the second-largest family of butterflies. It is one of the most common hairstreaks in North America, ranging over nearly the entire continent. It also occurs throughout Central America and in northern South America.

== General description ==
The adult gray hairstreak has a wingspan of 20–32 millimetres (0.79–1.26 in). The upper sides of the wings are gray with an orange spot on the hind margin. The underside of the wings are a lighter gray with white and black lines and orange and blue marginal spots near the hind-wings' tail-like extensions. These extensions twitch while at rest, and may imitate a separate head to encourage predators to go for the wings, potentially allowing the insect to survive.

Caterpillars are green with markings on the sides, covered in short yellow hairs. Like other caterpillars in the Lycaenidae family, S. melinus are attended by ants in a behavior known as myrmecophily.

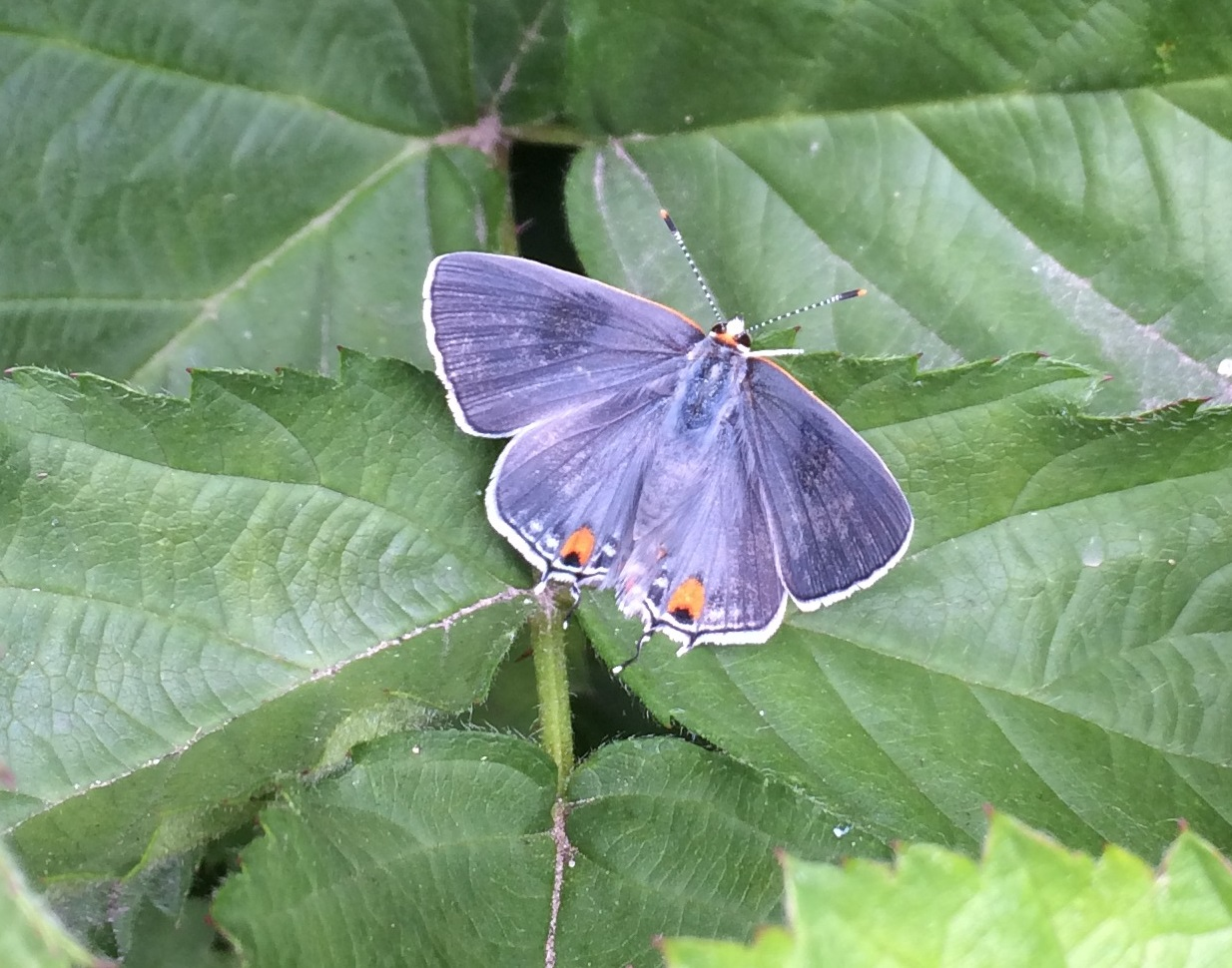
S. melinus on brambleberries in Los Angeles County, California

== Habitat ==
The gray hairstreak lives in a wide range of habitats ranging from tropical forests and mountains to temperate woodland areas and meadows, as well as cities and farmland.

== Food ==
The caterpillars of the gray hairstreak butterfly consume a wide range of food plants. However, they do mainly use mallows and legumes as their preferred host plant. They commonly use clovers as their food plant as well, eating rabbit-foot clover (Trifolium arvense), white clover (T. repens), bush clover (Lespedeza capitata), white sweet-clover (Melilotis alba), and Malva neglecta. Young caterpillars are typically found eating flowers and fruiting bodies of their host plant while the older caterpillars eat the leaves.
