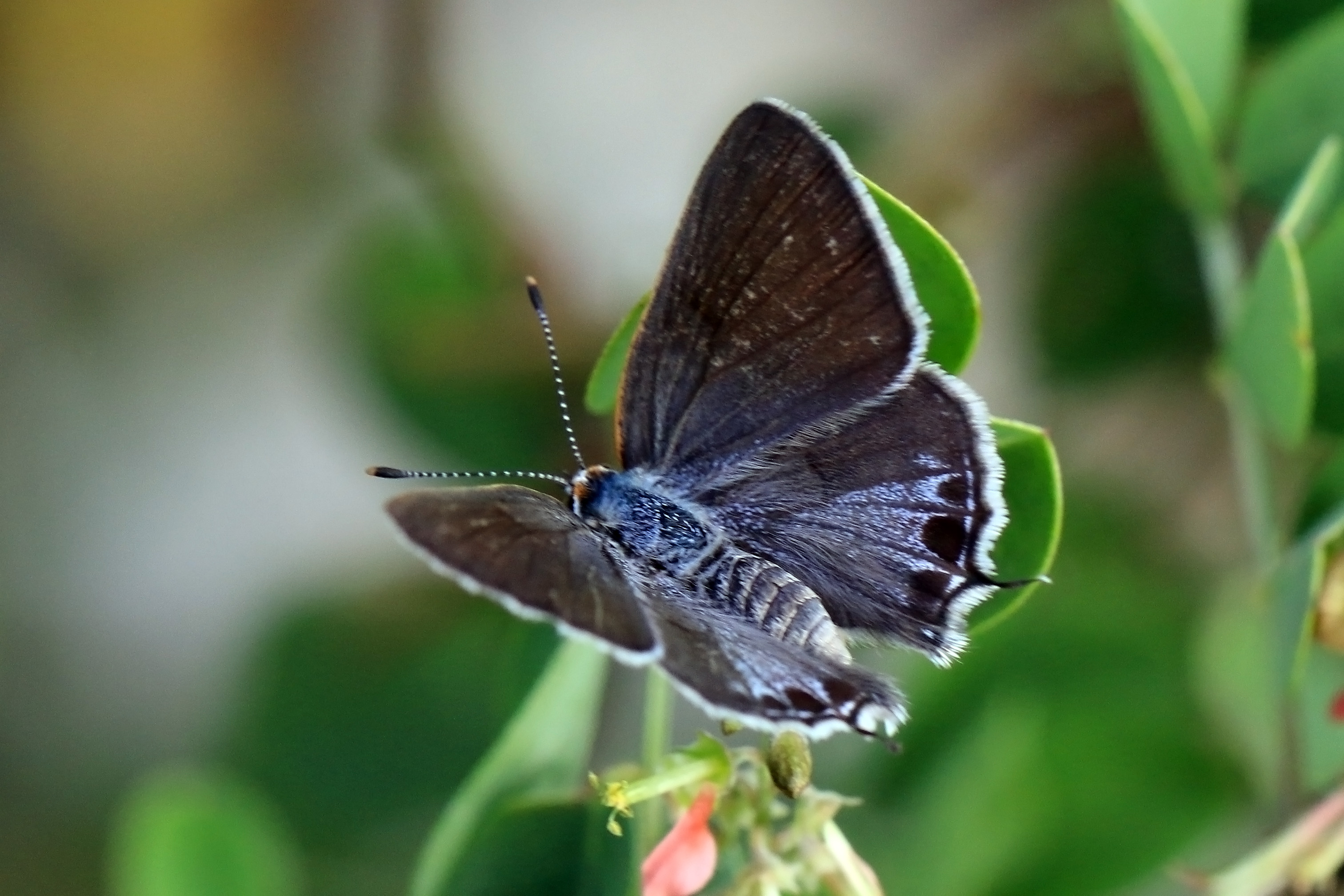
- Female, Grand Cayman
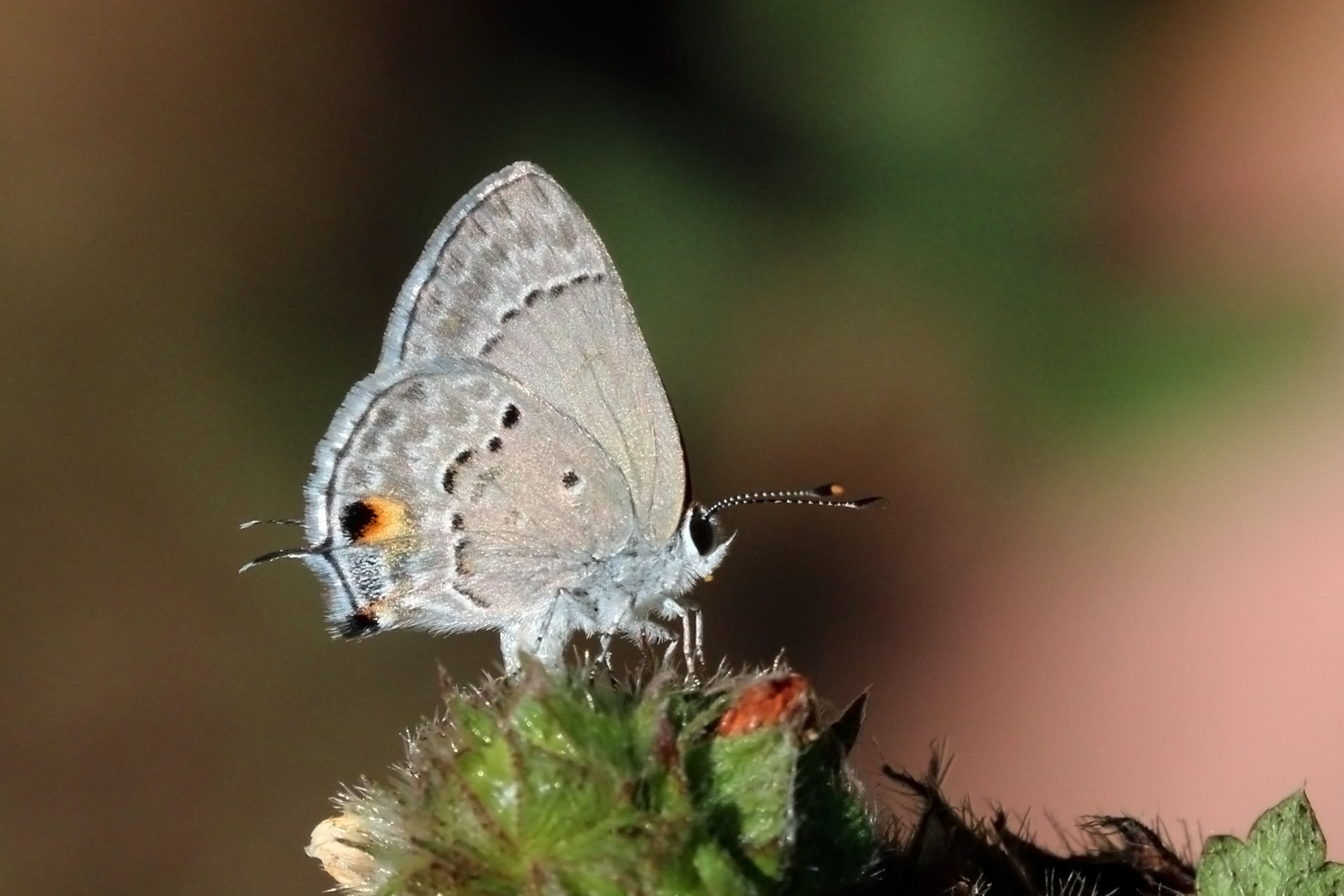
- Cuba

Scientific classification
- Domain: Eukaryota
- Kingdom: Animalia
- Phylum: Arthropoda
- Class: Insecta
- Order: Lepidoptera
- Family: Lycaenidae
- Genus: Strymon
- Species: S. istapa

Binomial name
- Strymon istapa (Reakirt, [1867])

= Strymon istapa =

Species of butterfly

Strymon istapa the mallow hairstreak, mallow-scrub hairstreak, dotted hairstreak or Hewitson's hairstreak. This diurnal butterfly is a widespread species that can be found in xeric habitats throughout the southern United States, Central America, parts of the Caribbean (including Cuba and Grand Cayman), and rarely in South America. This species can be spotted in rural and suburban areas in which human infringement has created open fields or tracks of overgrown weeds as a result of land clearing. These butterflies are often seen rubbing their hindwings together presumably to attract attention to their antenna mimicry scales located on the outer margin of the hindwing.
