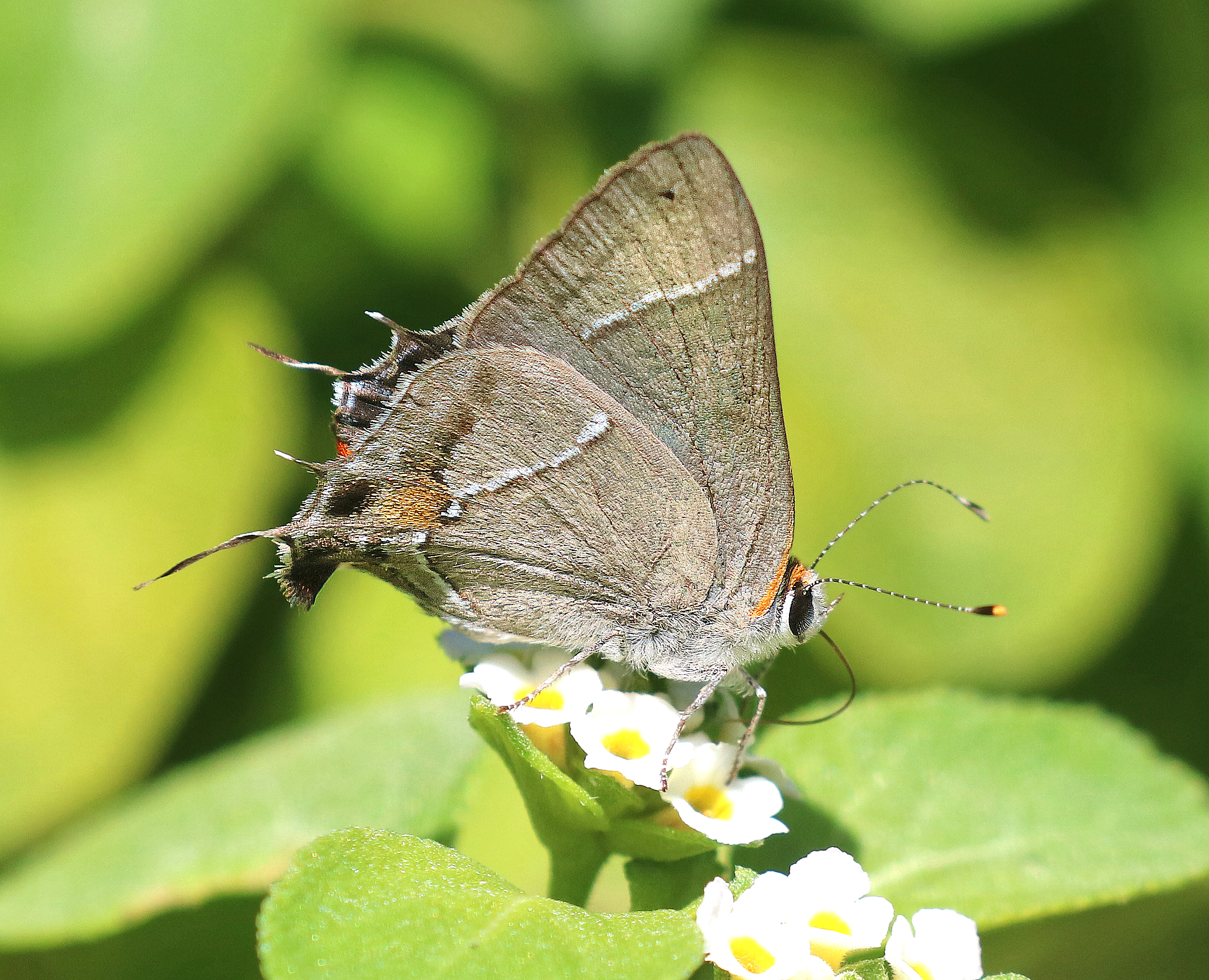

Scientific classification
- Kingdom: Animalia
- Phylum: Arthropoda
- Clade: Pancrustacea
- Class: Insecta
- Order: Lepidoptera
- Family: Lycaenidae
- Tribe: Eumaeini
- Genus: Strymon
- Species: S. martialis

Binomial name
- Strymon martialis (Herrich-Schäffer, 1864)

= Strymon martialis =

Species of butterfly

Strymon martialis, known generally as martial scrub hairstreak, is a species of hairstreak in the butterfly family Lycaenidae. Other common names include the Cuban gray hairstreak and martial hairstreak.

The MONA or Hodges number for Strymon martialis is 4340.
