= List of butterflies of Jamaica =

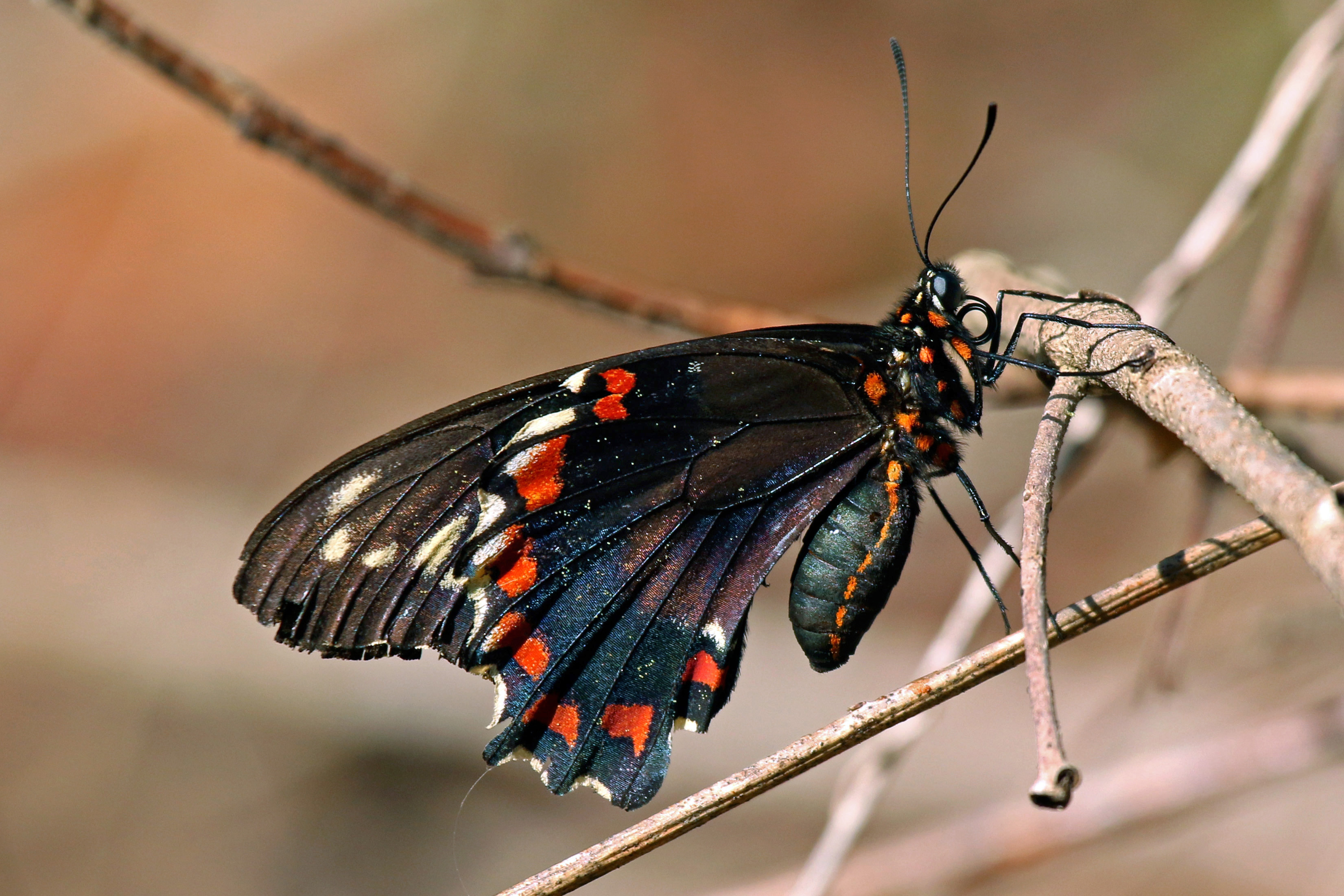
Battus polydamas jamaicensis

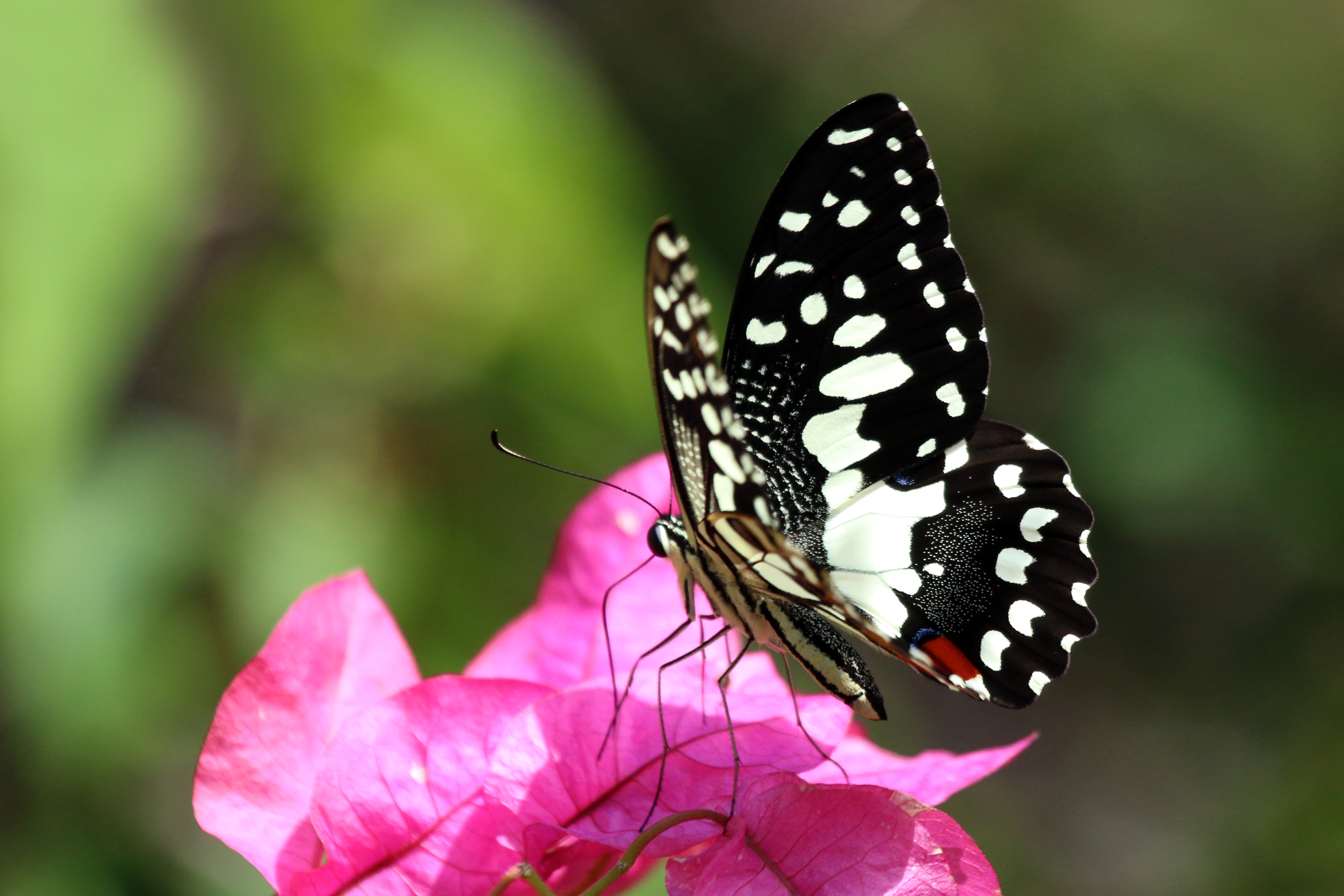
Papilio demoleus demoleus

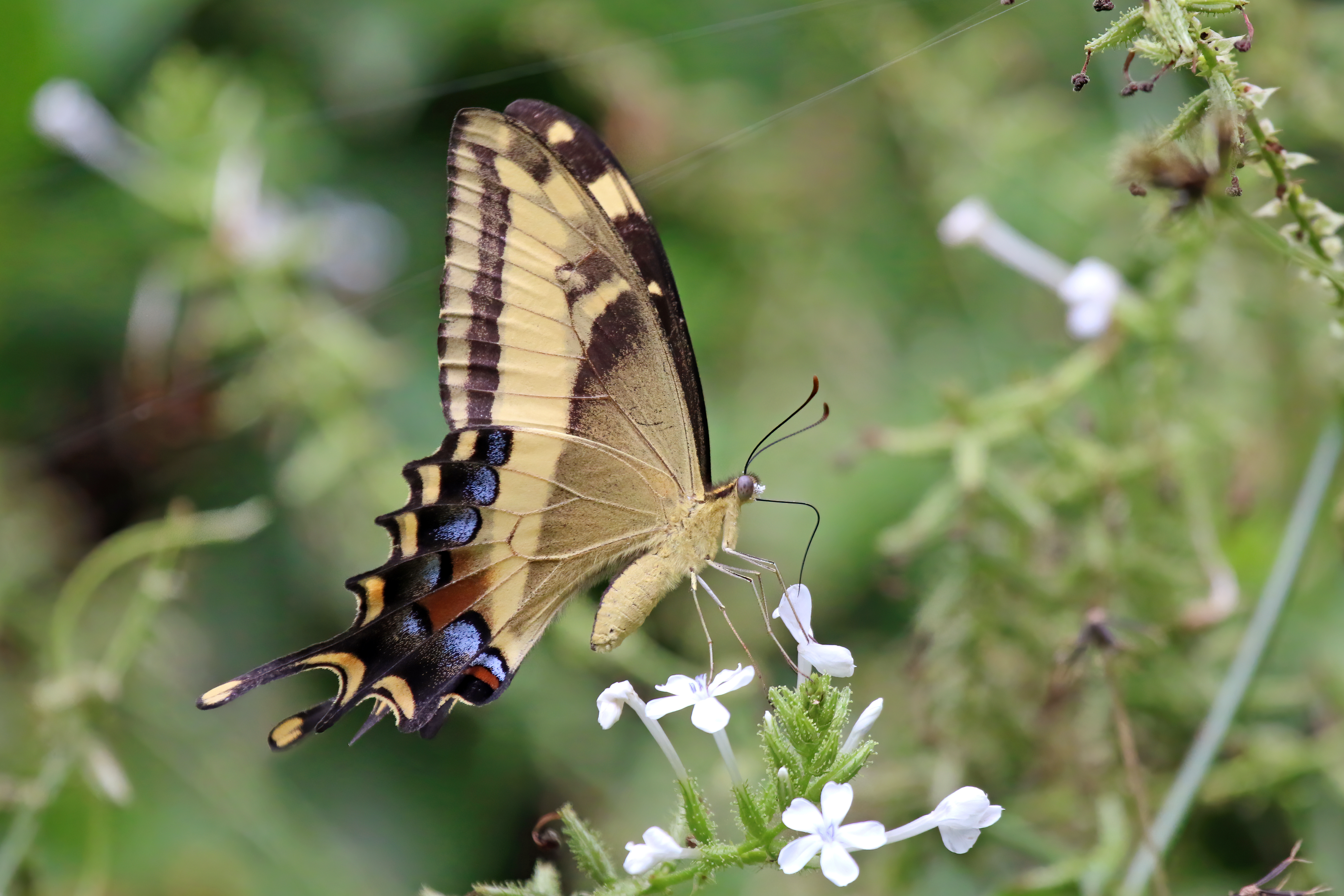
Papilio andraemon andraemon

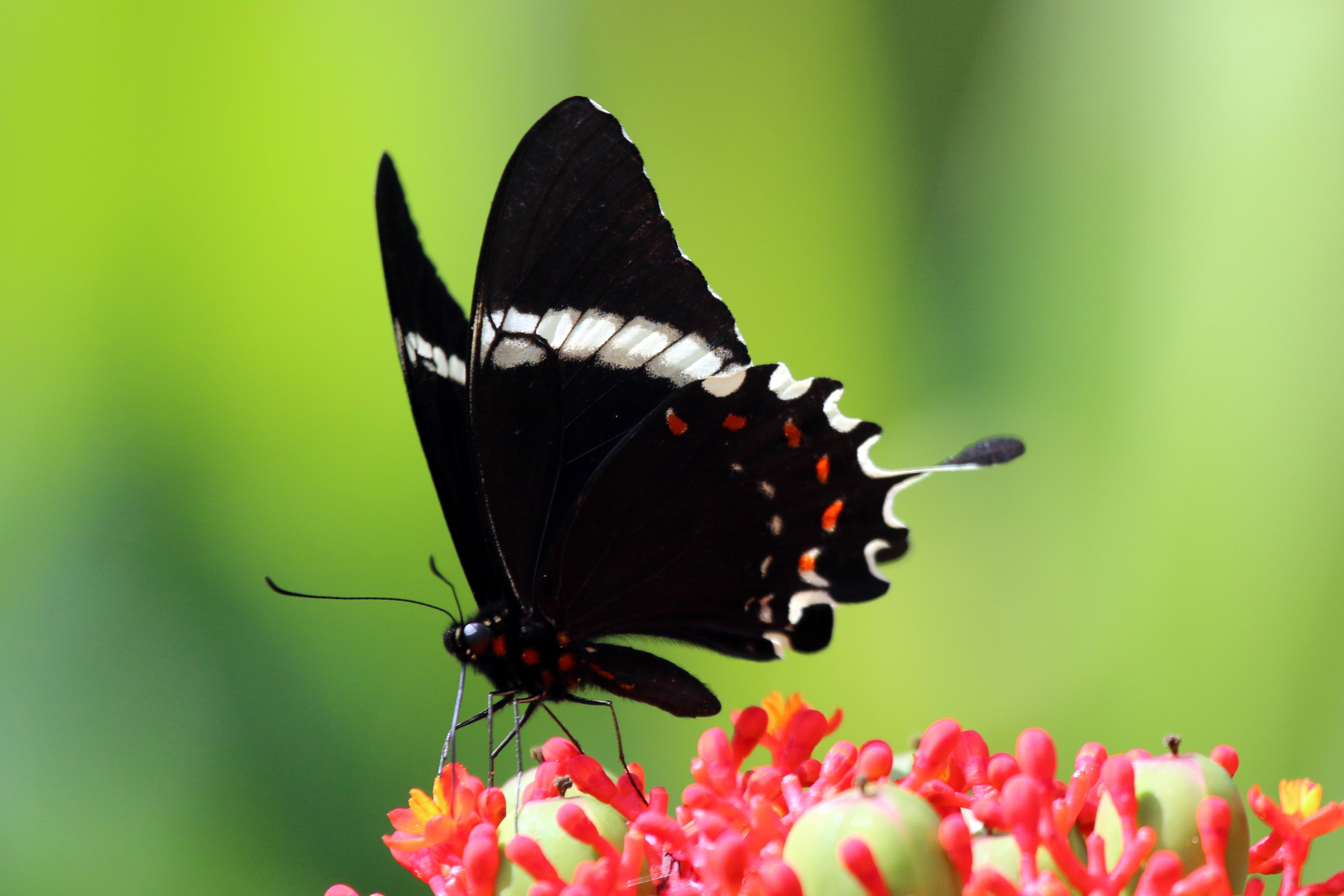
Papilio pelaus pelaus

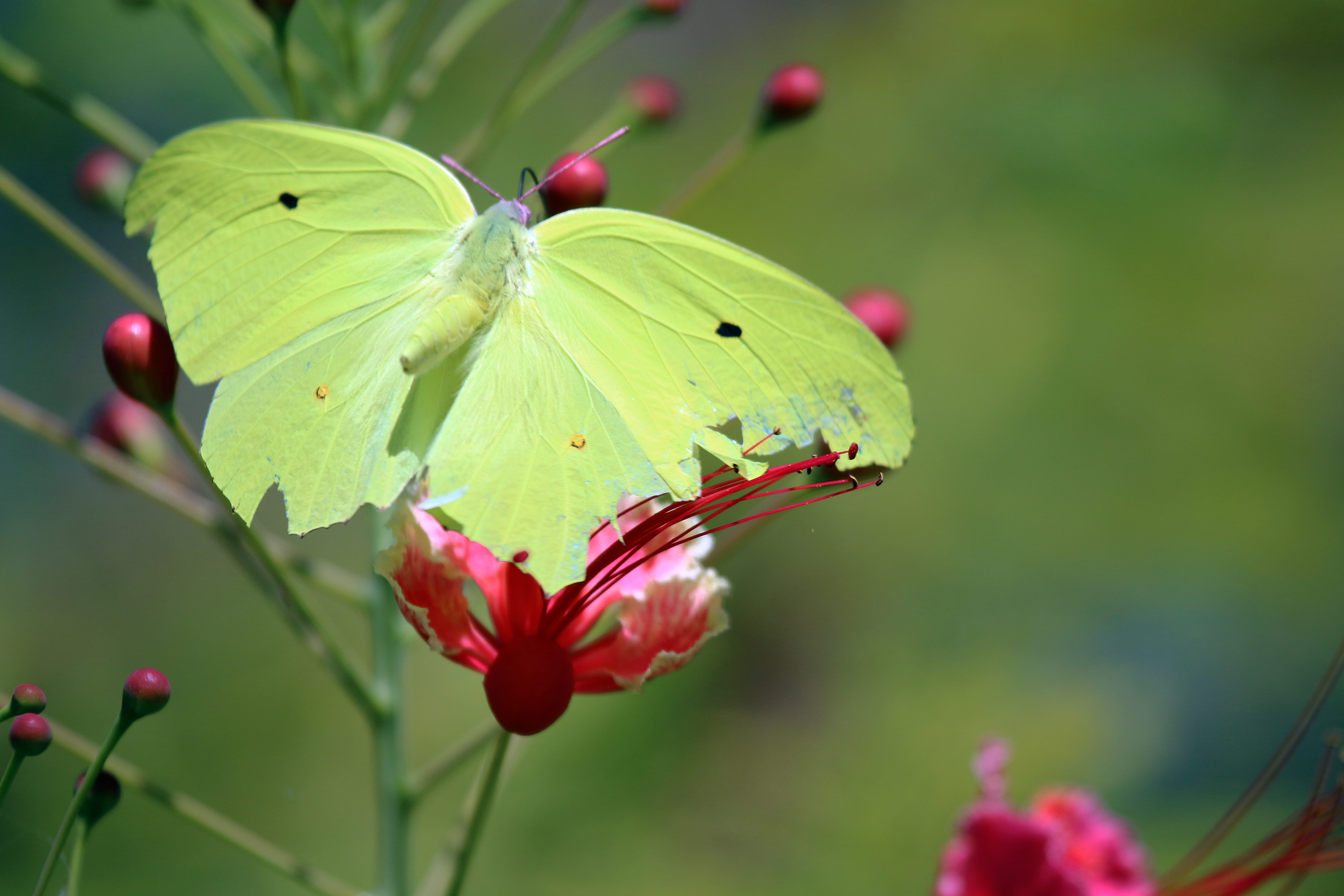
Anteos maerula maerula

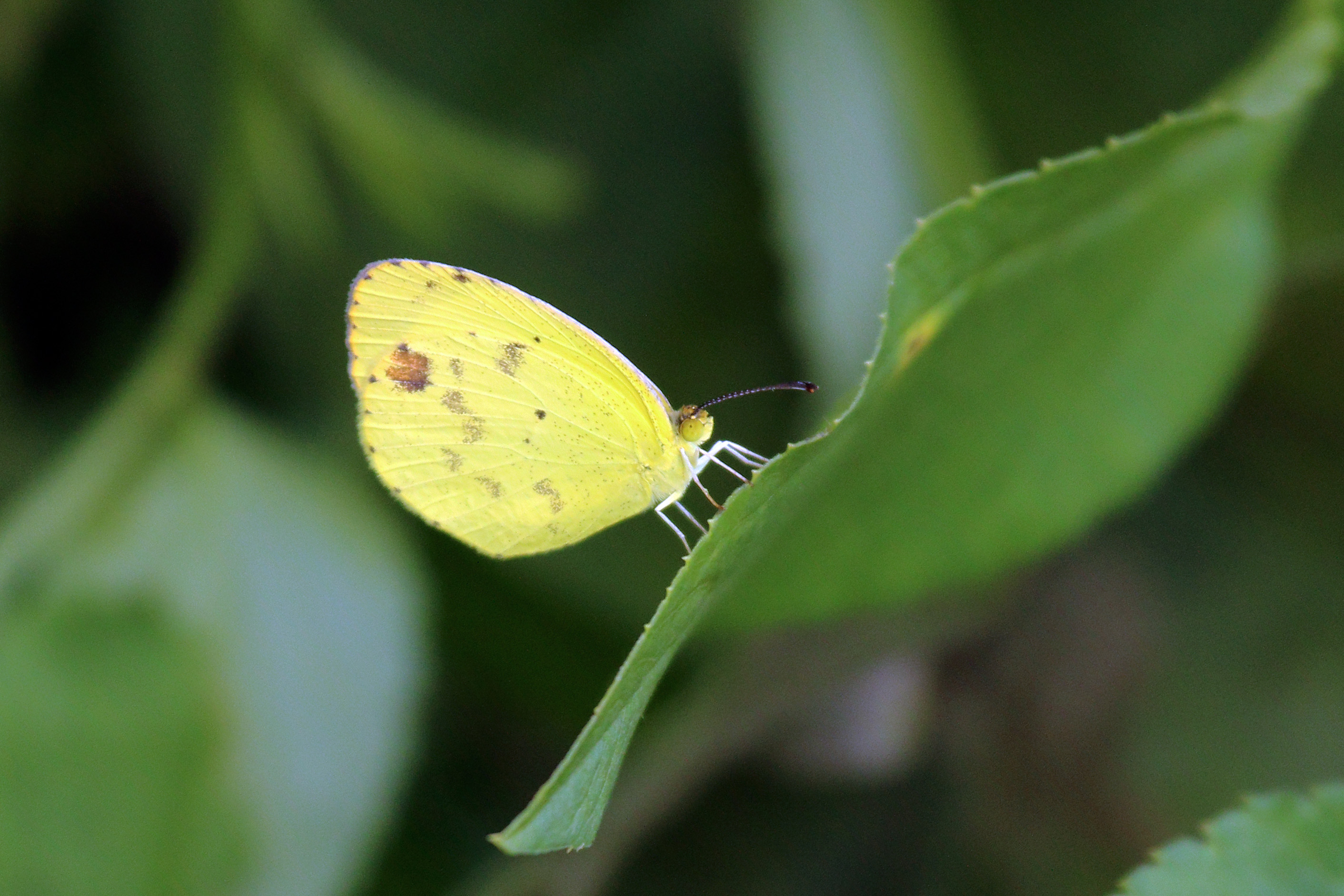
Eurema lisa euterpe

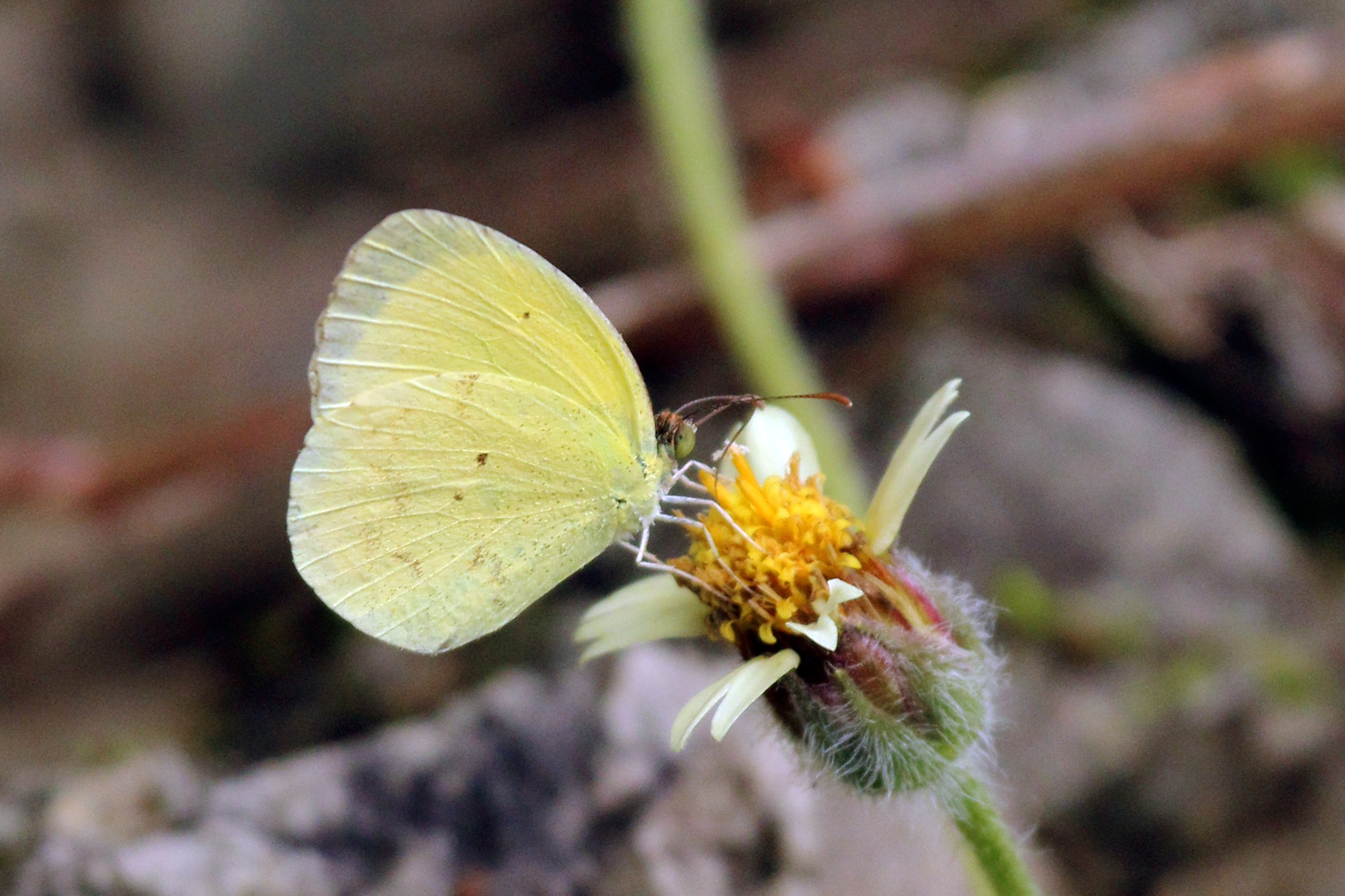
Pyrisitia nise nise

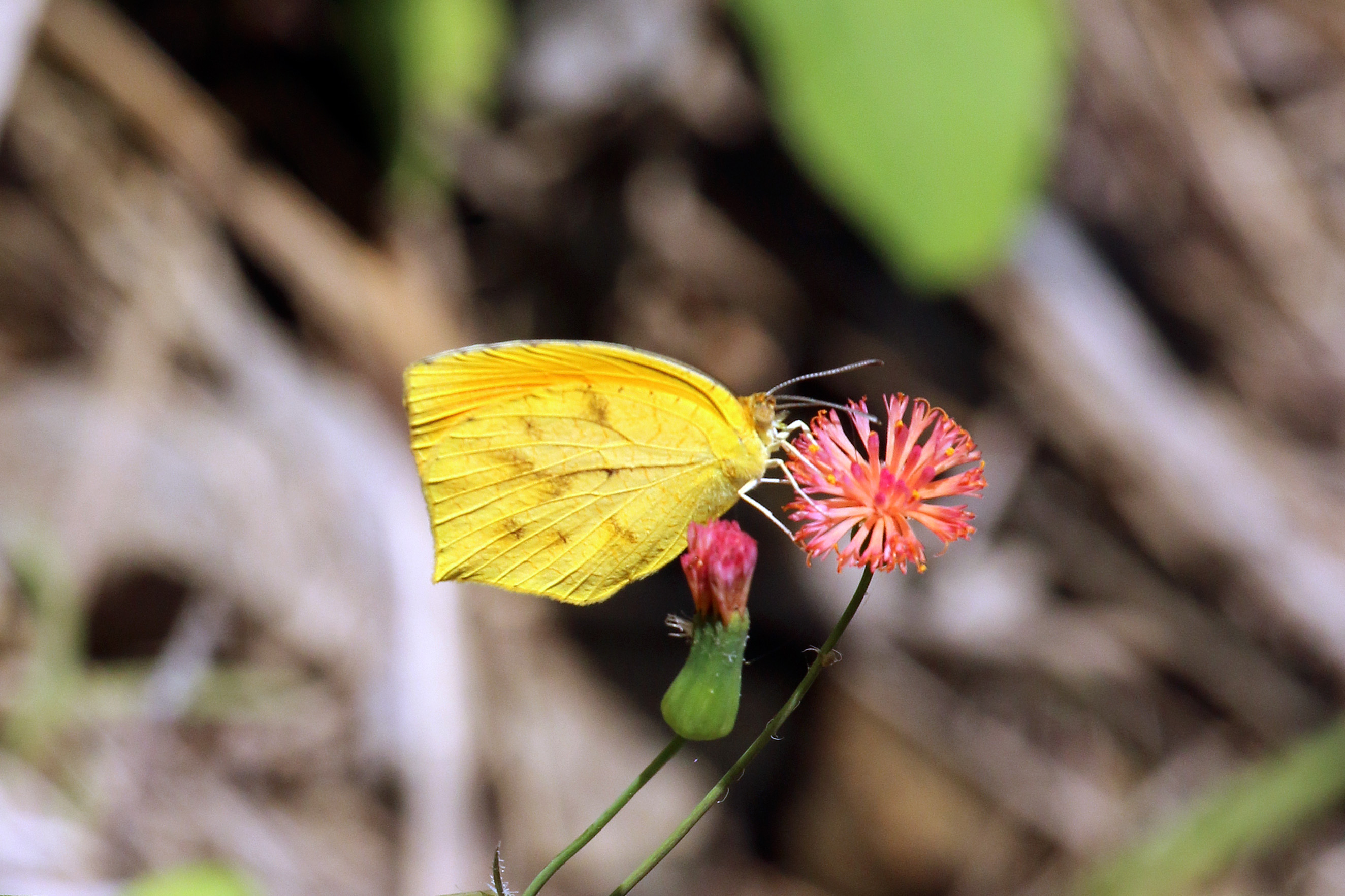
Eurema proterpia

This list of butterflies of Jamaica lists butterflies recorded from the island of Jamaica.

The list is most likely incomplete. There is also a list of moths of Jamaica.

== Papilionidae ==
=== Papilioninae ===
- Battus polydamas jamaicensis, gold rim swallowtail (Rothschild & Jordan, 1906)
- Eurytides marcellinus (Doubleday, [1845])
- Papilio demoleus demoleus, lime swallowtail Linnaeus, 1758
- Papilio homerus Fabricius, 1793
- Papilio melonius Rothschild & Jordan, 1906
- Papilio thersites Fabricius, 1775
- Papilio andraemon andraemon, Bahamian swallowtail (Hübner, [1823])
- Papilio pelaus pelaus, prickly ash swallowtail Fabricius, 1775

== Hesperiidae ==
=== Eudaminae ===
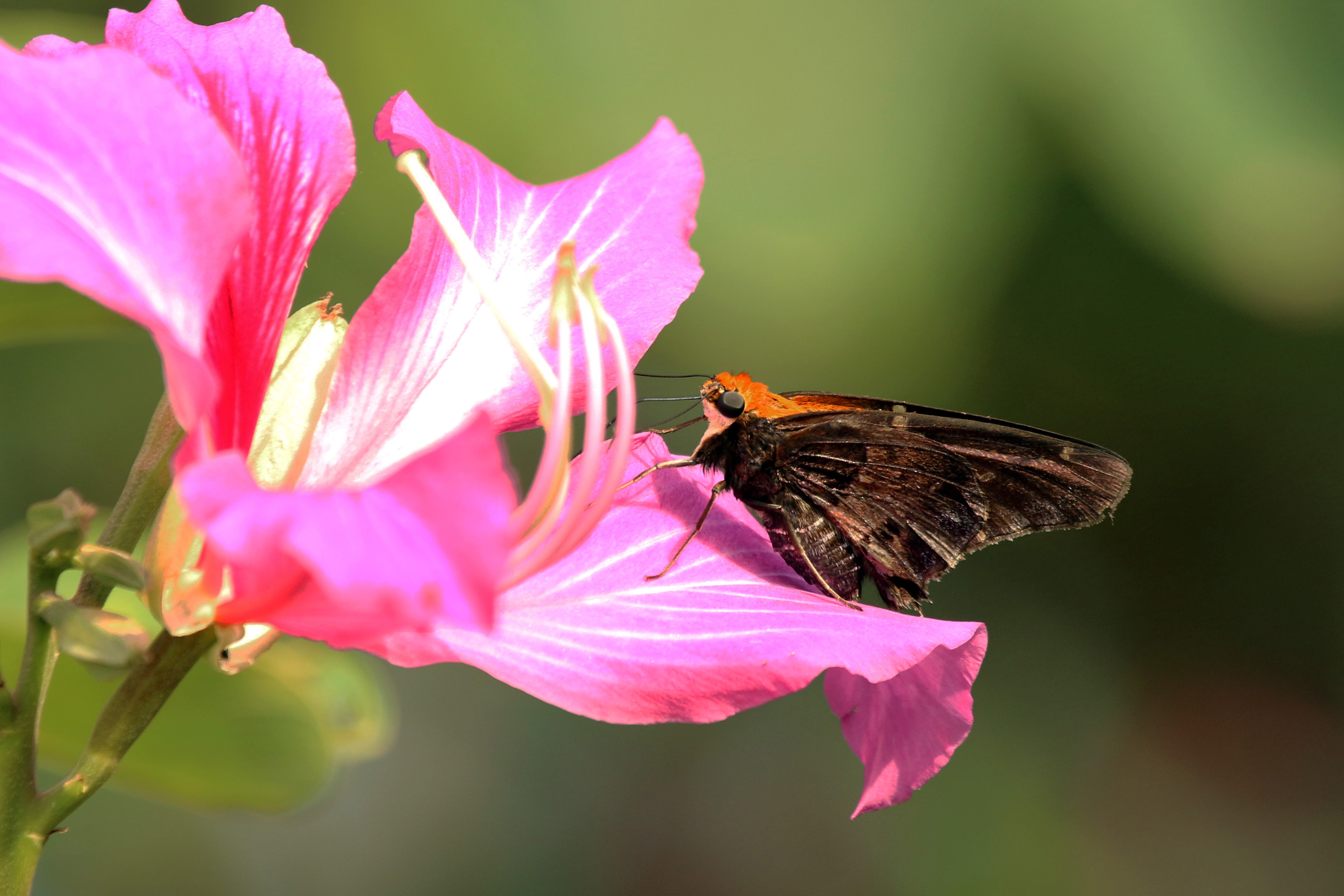
Proteides mercurius jamaicensis

- Aguna asander jasper Evans, 1952
- Astraptes anaphus anausis (Godman & Salvin, 1896)
- Astraptes jaira (Butler, 1870)
- Astraptes talus (Cramer, 1777)
- Cabares potrillo potrillo (Lucas, 1857)
- Chioides churchi E. Bell & W. Comstock, 1948
- Epargyreus antaeus (Hewitson, 1867)
- Phocides lincea perkinsi (Kaye, 1931)
- Polygonus leo hagar Evans, 1952
- Proteides mercurius jamaicensis, mercurial skipper Skinner, 1920

=== Pyrginae ===
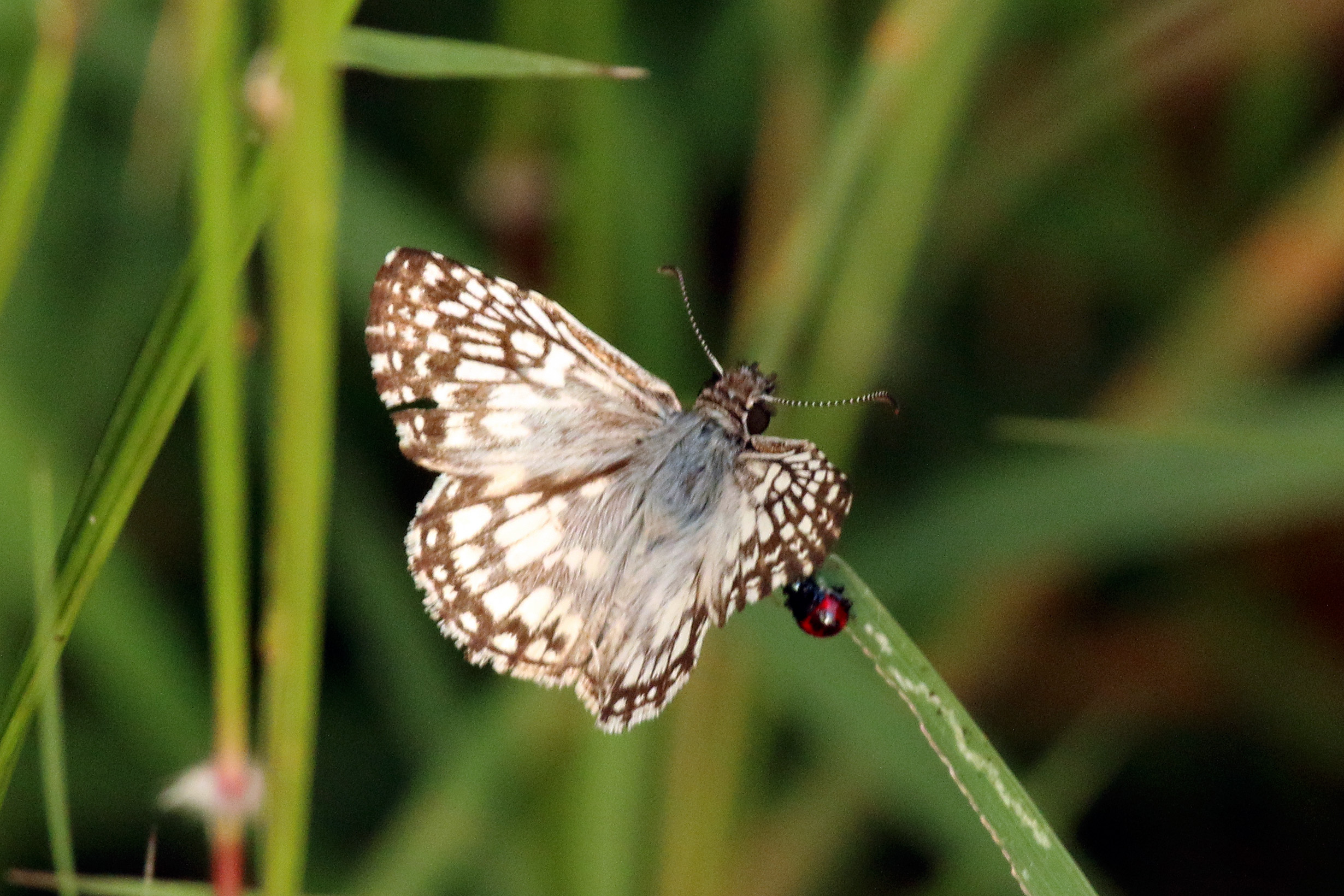
Pyrgus oileus

- Anastrus sempiternus dilloni (E. Bell & W. Comstock, 1948)
- Eantis mithridates (Fabricius, 1793)
- Ephyriades arcas philemon (Fabricius, 1775)
- Ephyriades brunnea jamaicensis (Möschler, 1879)
- Gesta gesta (Herrich-Schäffer, 1863)
- Grais stigmaticus juncta Evans, 1953
- Pyrgus oileus, tropical checkered skipper (Linnaeus, 1767)
- Timochares runia Evans, 1953
- Urbanus proteus, common long-tailed skipper (Linnaeus 1758)

=== Hesperiinae ===
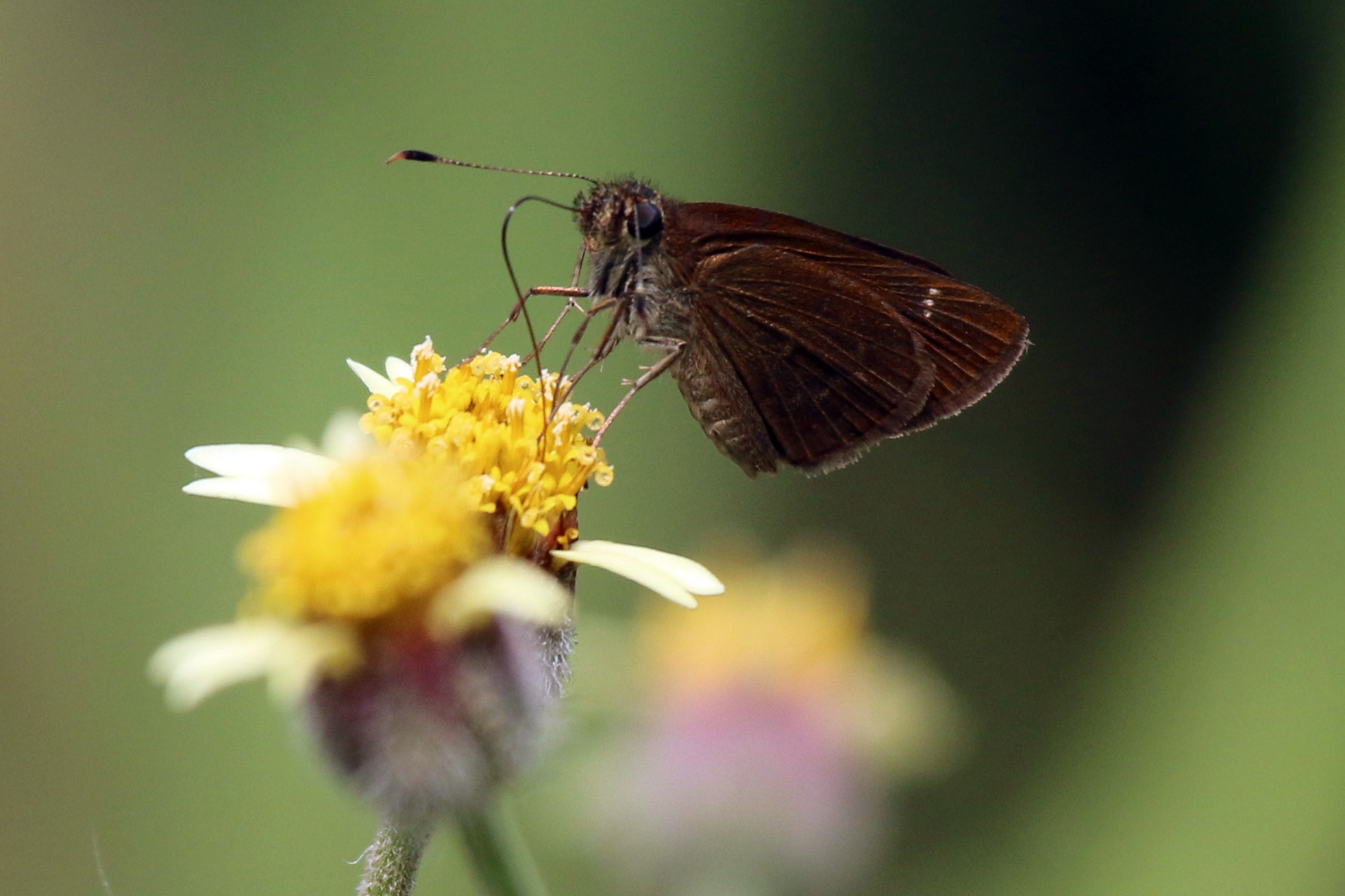
Euphyes singularis insolata

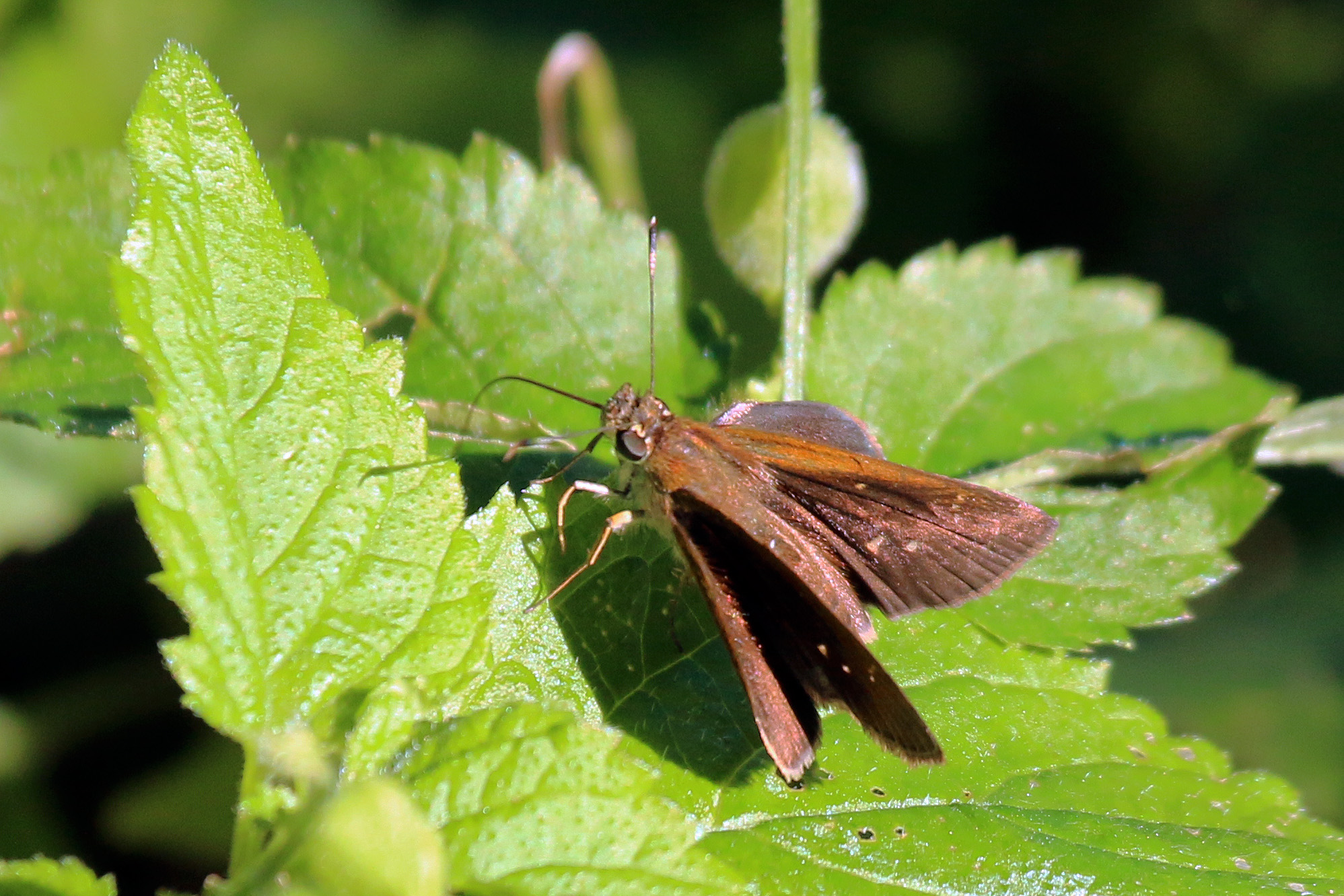
Rhinthon cubana cubana

- Choranthus lilliae E. Bell, 1931
- Cymaenes tripunctus tripunctus (Herrich-Schäffer, 1865)
- Euphyes singularis insolata, Butler's branded skipper (Butler, 1878)
- Nyctelius nyctelius nyctelius (Latreille, [1824])
- Panoquina ocola ocola (W. H. Edwards, 1863)
- Perichares philetes (Gmelin, [1790])
- Pyrrhocalles jamaicensis, Schaus's skipper (Schaus, 1902)
- Rhinthon cubana cubana, branded skipper (Herrich-Schäffer, 1865)
- Synapte malitiosa malitiosa (Herrich-Schäffer, 1865)
- Troyus turneri Warren & Turland 2012
- Wallengrenia vesuria (Plötz, 1882)

== Pieridae ==
=== Coliadinae ===
- Abaeis nicippe (Cramer, 1779)
- Anteos clorinde (Godart, [1824])
- Anteos maerula maerula, yellow angled-sulphur (Fabricius, 1775)
- Aphrissa godartiana hartonia (Butler, 1870)
- Aphrissa statira cubana d'Almeida, 1939
- Eurema adamsi (Lathy, 1898)
- Eurema boisduvaliana (C. Felder & R. Felder, 1865)
- Kricogonia lyside (Godart, 1819)
- Nathalis iole iole Boisduval, 1836
- Phoebis argante comstocki Avinoff, 1944
- Pyrisitia dina parvumbra (Kaye, 1925)
- Pyrisitia lisa euterpe, little sulphur (Ménétriés, 1832)
- Pyrisitia messalina (Fabricius, 1785)
- Pyrisitia nise nise, mimosa yellow (Cramer, 1775)
- Pyrisitia proterpia proterpia, proterpia orange, tailed orange (Fabricius, 1775)

=== Pierinae ===
- Ganyra josephina paramaryllis (W. Comstock, 1943)
- Appias drusilla castalia, Jamaican albatross (Fabricius, 1793)

== Lycaenidae ==
=== Theclinae ===
- Chlorostrymon orbis K. Johnson & D. Smith, 1993
- Chlorostrymon simaethis jago (W. Comstock & Huntington, 1943)
- Cyanophrys crethona (Hewitson, 1874)
- Cyanophrys hartii T. Turner & J. Miller, 1992
- Electrostrymon angelia pantoni (W. Comstock & Huntington, 1943)
- Electrostrymon pan (Drury, 1773)
- Nesiostrymon shoumatoffi (W. Comstock & Huntington, 1943)
- Rekoa bourkei (Kaye, [1925])
- Strymon acis gossei (W. Comstock & Huntington, 1943)
- Strymon bazochii gundlachianus M. Bates, 1935
- Strymon istapa cybira (Hewitson, 1874)
- Strymon limenia (Hewitson, 1868)
- Strymon martialis (Herrich-Schäffer, 1864)

=== Polyommatinae ===
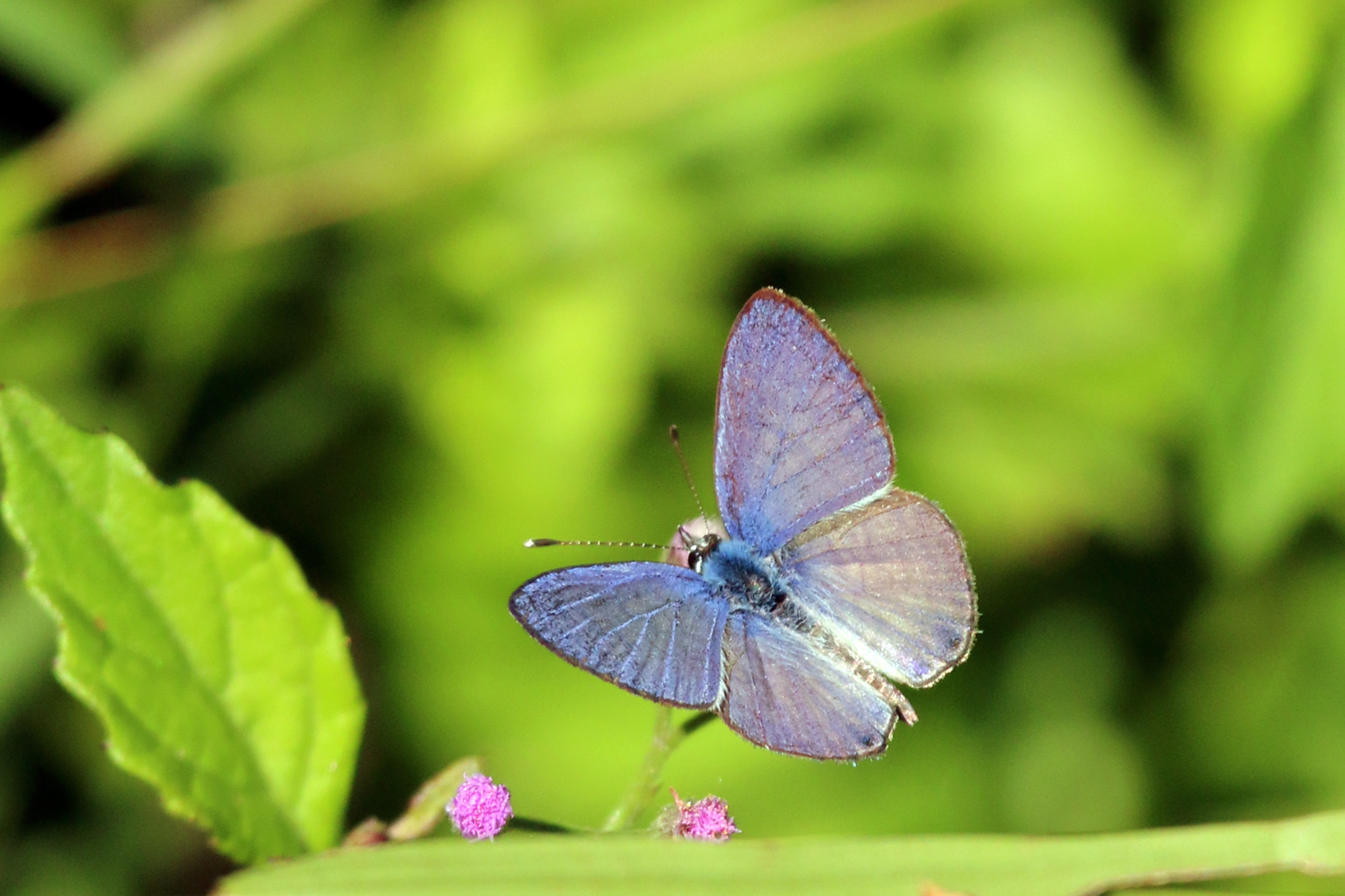
Leptotes cassius theonus

- Brephidium exilis isophthalma (Herrich-Schäffer, 1862)
- Cyclargus dominica (Möschler, 1886)
- Cyclargus shuturn K. Johnson & Bálint, 1995
- Hemiargus ceraunus ceraunus (Fabricius, 1793)
- Leptotes cassius theonus, Cassius blue(Lucas, 1857)
- Leptotes perkinsae Kaye, 1931

== Nymphalidae ==
=== Libytheinae ===
- Libytheana terena (Godart, 1819)

=== Danainae ===
- Anetia jaegeri (Ménétriés, 1832)
- Danaus cleophile (Godart, 1819)
- Danaus eresimus tethys W. Forbes, [1944]
- Danaus gilippus jamaicensis (H. Bates, 1864)
- Danaus plexippus megalippe (Hübner, [1826])
- Greta diaphanus diaphanus (Drury, 1773)
- Lycorea halia cleobaea (Godart, 1819)

=== Heliconiinae ===
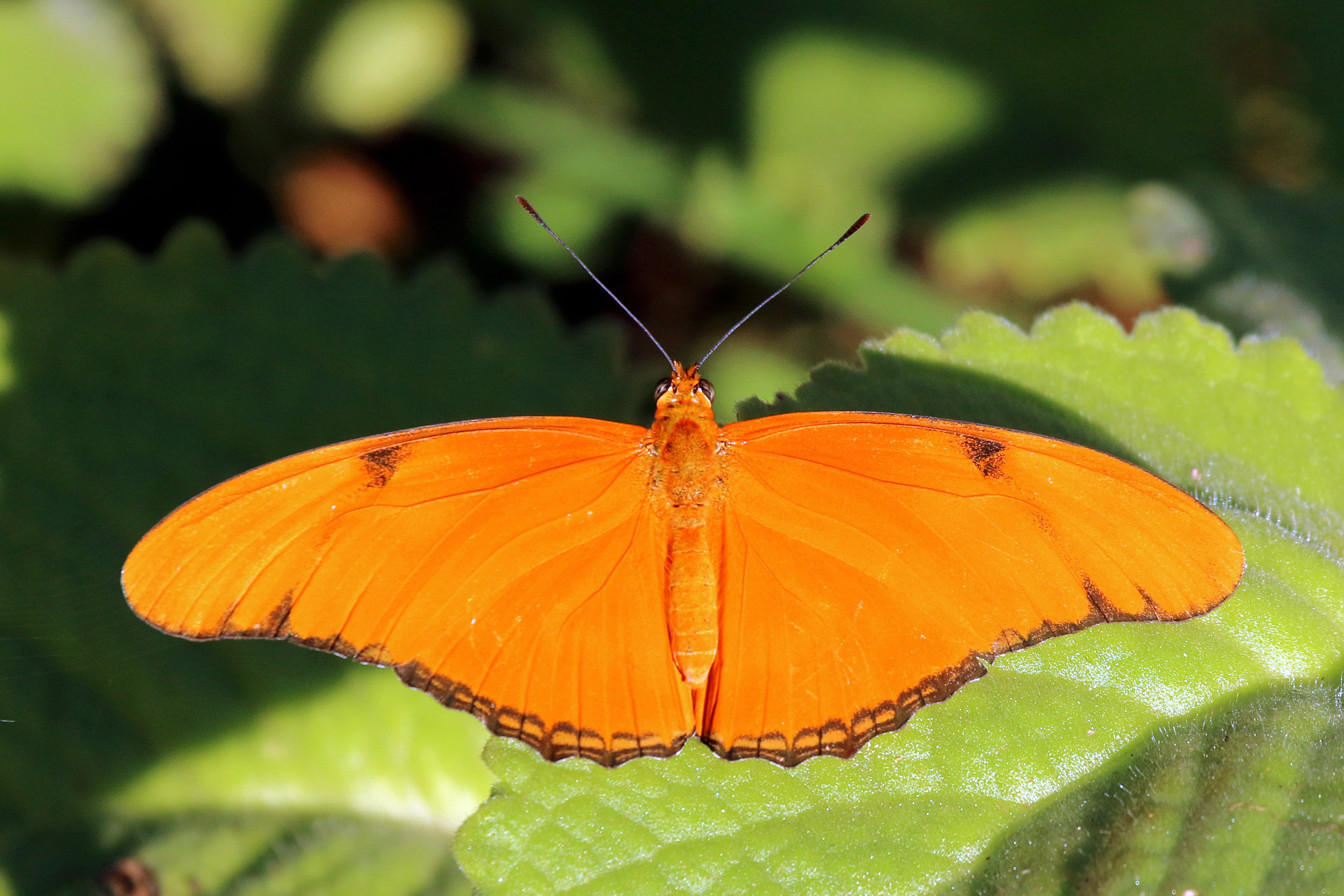
Dryas iulia delila

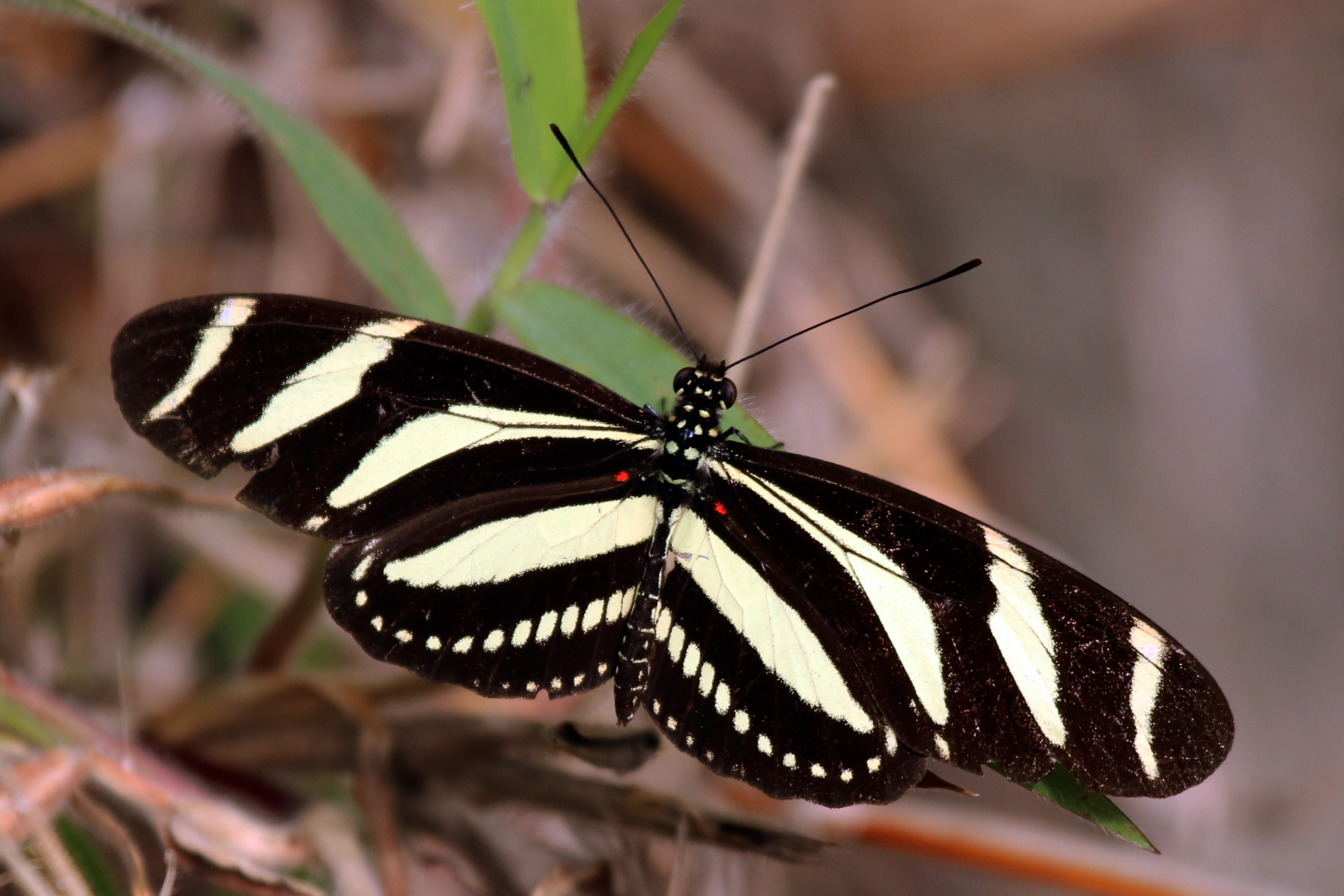
Heliconius charithonia simulator

- Agraulis vanilla insularis, Gulf fritillary, silver-spotted flambeau (Linnaeus, 1758)
- Dryas iulia delila, Julia butterfly (Fabricius, 1775)
- Euptoieta claudia, variegated fritillary (Cramer, 1775)
- Euptoieta hegesia hegesia, tropical fritillary (Cramer, 1779)
- Heliconius charithonia simulator, zebra heliconian longwing Röber, 1921

=== Limenitidinae ===
- Adelpha abyla (Hewitson, 1850)

=== Apaturinae ===
- Doxocopa laure laura (Hübner, 1823])

=== Biblidinae ===
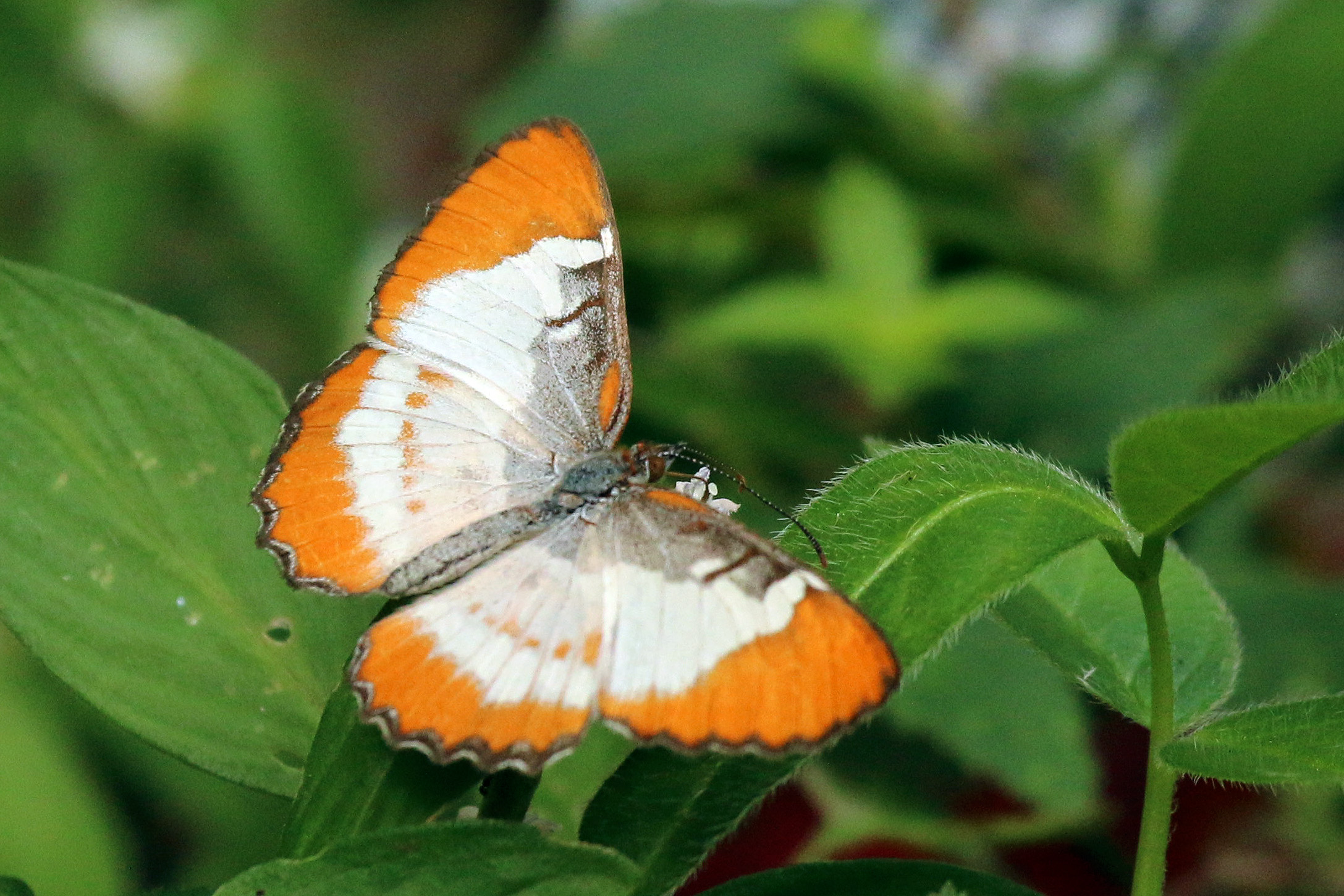
Mestra dorcas dorcas

- Eunica monima (Stoll, 1782)
- Eunica tatila tatilista Kaye, 1926
- Dynamine serina serina (Fabricius, 1775)
- Hamadryas amphichloe diasia (Fruhstorfer, 1916)
- Lucinia cadma (Drury, 1773)
- Mestra dorcas dorcas, Jamaican mestra(Fabricius, 1775)

=== Cyrestinae ===
- Marpesia chiron (Fabricius, 1775)
- Marpesia eleuchea pellenis (Godart, [1824])

=== Nymphalinae ===
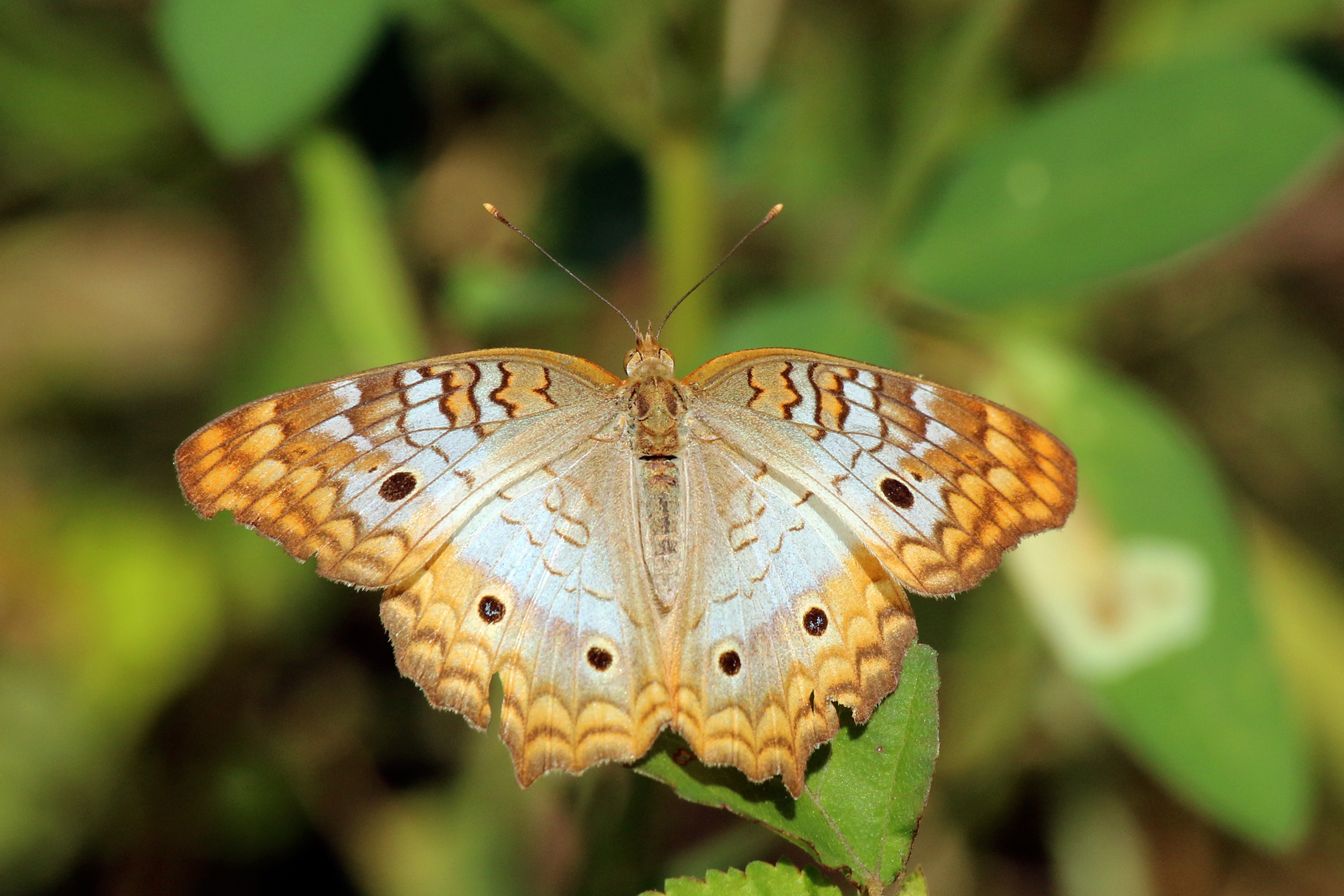
Anartia jatrophae jamaicensis

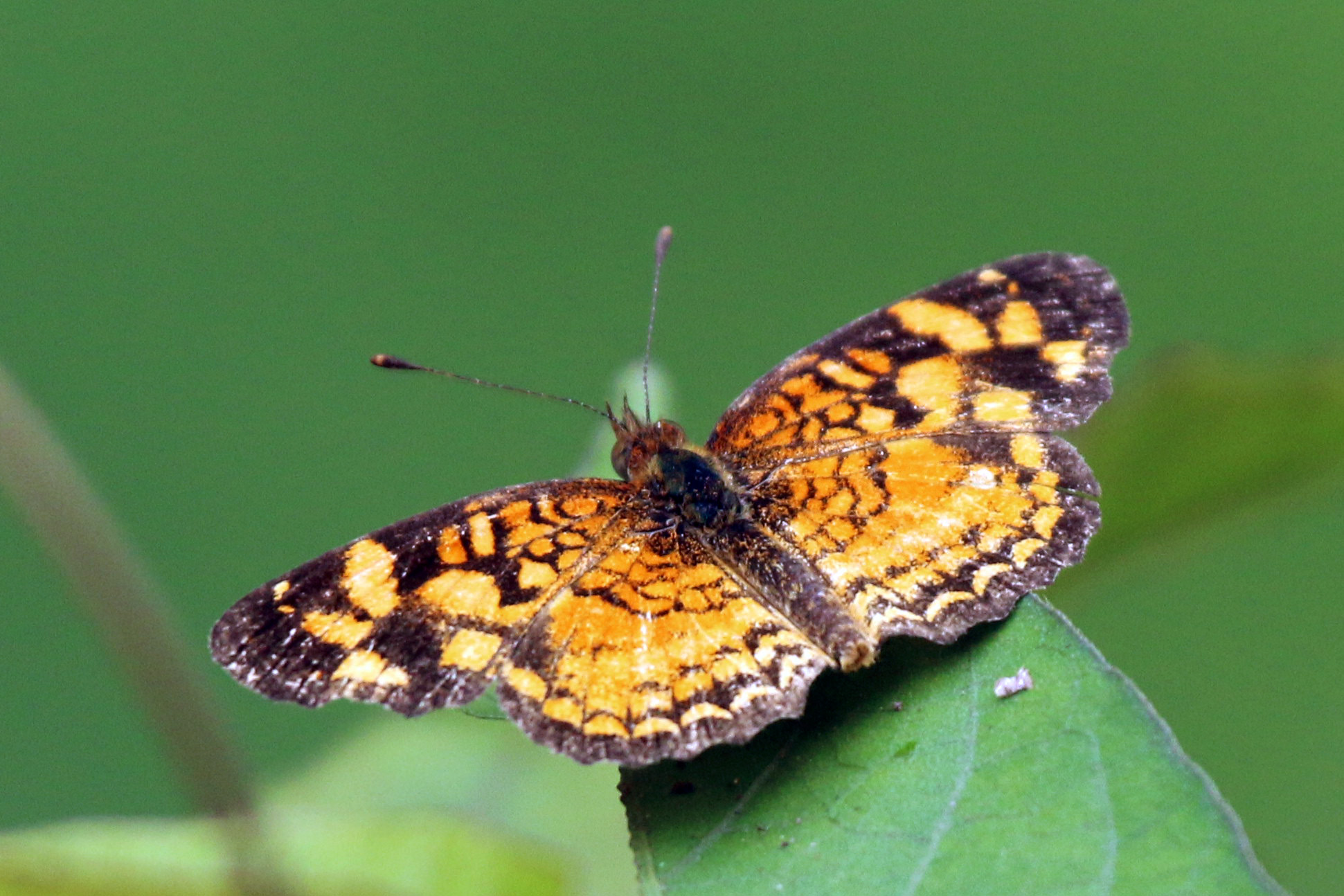
Anthanassa frisia frisia

- Anartia jatrophae jamaicensis, Jamaican white peacock Möschler, 1886
- Anthanassa frisia frisia, Cuban crescentspot (Poey, 1832)
- Antillea pelops pygmaea (Godart, 1819)
- Antillea proclea (Doubleday, [1847])
- Atlantea pantoni (Kaye, 1906)
- Colobura dirce wolcotti W. Comstock, 1942
- Historis acheronta cadmus (Cramer, 1775)
- Hypanartia paullus (Fabricius, 1793)
- Junonia evarete zonalis, tropical buckeye C. Felder & R. Felder, [1867]
- Junonia genoveva, mangrove buckeye (Cramer, 1780)
- Siproeta stelenes stelenes, Antillean malachite (Linnaeus, 1758)
- Vanessa atalanta rubria, red admiral (Fruhstorfer, 1909)
- Vanessa virginiensis, American painted lady (Drury, 1773)

=== Charaxinae ===
- Anaea troglodyta portia, Jamaican tropical leafwing (Fabricius, 1775)
- Fountainea johnsoni (Avinoff & Shoumatoff, 1941)

=== Satyrinae ===
- Calisto zangis (Fabricius, 1775)
