= Prickly ash =

Prickly ash may refer to:

- Aralia spinosa, a plant native to eastern North America
- Orites excelsus, a plant native to Australia
- Zanthoxylum, the genus containing Sichuan pepper (花椒) and the common prickly-ash native to the American Midwest
- Papilio pelaus, the prickly ash swallowtail butterfly
