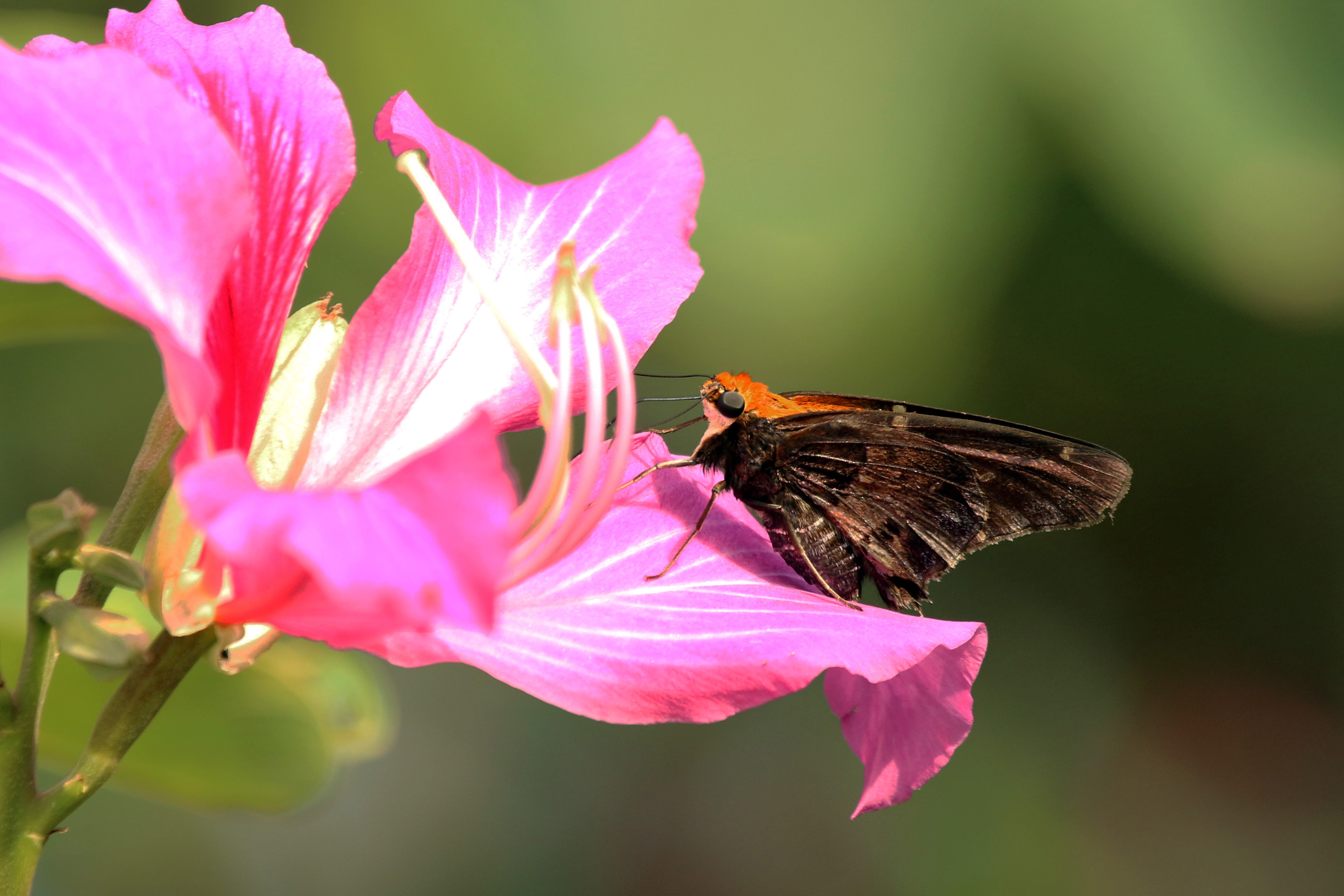

Scientific classification
- Kingdom: Animalia
- Phylum: Arthropoda
- Clade: Pancrustacea
- Class: Insecta
- Order: Lepidoptera
- Family: Hesperiidae
- Genus: Proteides
- Species: P. mercurius

Binomial name
- Proteides mercurius (Fabricius, 1787)

= Proteides mercurius =

Species of butterfly

Proteides mercurius, the mercurial skipper, is a species of dicot skipper in the butterfly family Hesperiidae. It is found in the Caribbean Sea, Central America, North America, and South America.

== Subspecies ==
These five subspecies belong to the species Proteides mercurius:

- Proteides mercurius angasi Godman & Salvin, 1886
- Proteides mercurius mercurius (Fabricius, 1787)
- Proteides mercurius sanantonio (Lucas, 1857)
- Proteides mercurius sanchesi Bell & Comstock, 1948
- Proteides mercurius vincenti Bell & Comstock, 1948
