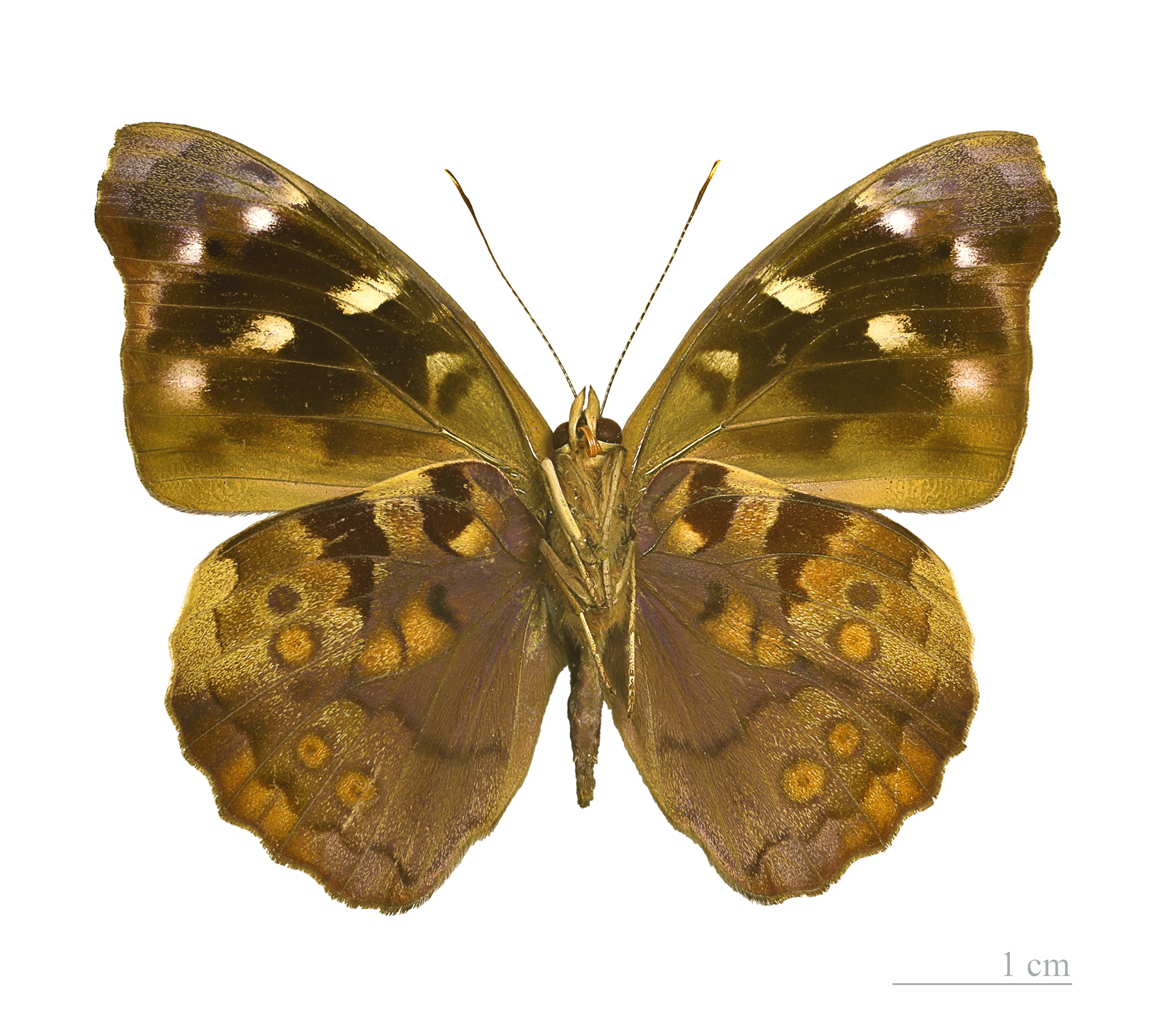
- Male Eunica mygdonia (museum specimen)

Scientific classification
- Kingdom: Animalia
- Phylum: Arthropoda
- Clade: Pancrustacea
- Class: Insecta
- Order: Lepidoptera
- Family: Nymphalidae
- Tribe: Epicaliini
- Genus: Eunica; Hübner, [1819]

Type species
- Papilio monima Stoll, 1782

Diversity
- About 40 species

Synonyms
- Amycla Doubleday, 1849 (non Rafinesque, 1815: preoccupied); Callianira Doubleday, 1847 (non Péron & Lesueur, 1810: preoccupied); Eunice Geyer, 1832 (non Rafinesque, 1815: preoccupied); Evonyme Hübner, 1819; Faunia Poey, 1847 (non Robineau-Desvoidy, 1830: preoccupied); Libythina Felder, 1861

= Eunica =

Genus of brush-footed butterflies

Eunica is a genus of nymphalid butterflies found in the Neotropical realm.

These butterflies have some eye-like spots on the wings. According to one research, there is an evolutionary tendency for decreasing of the number of spots.

== Species ==
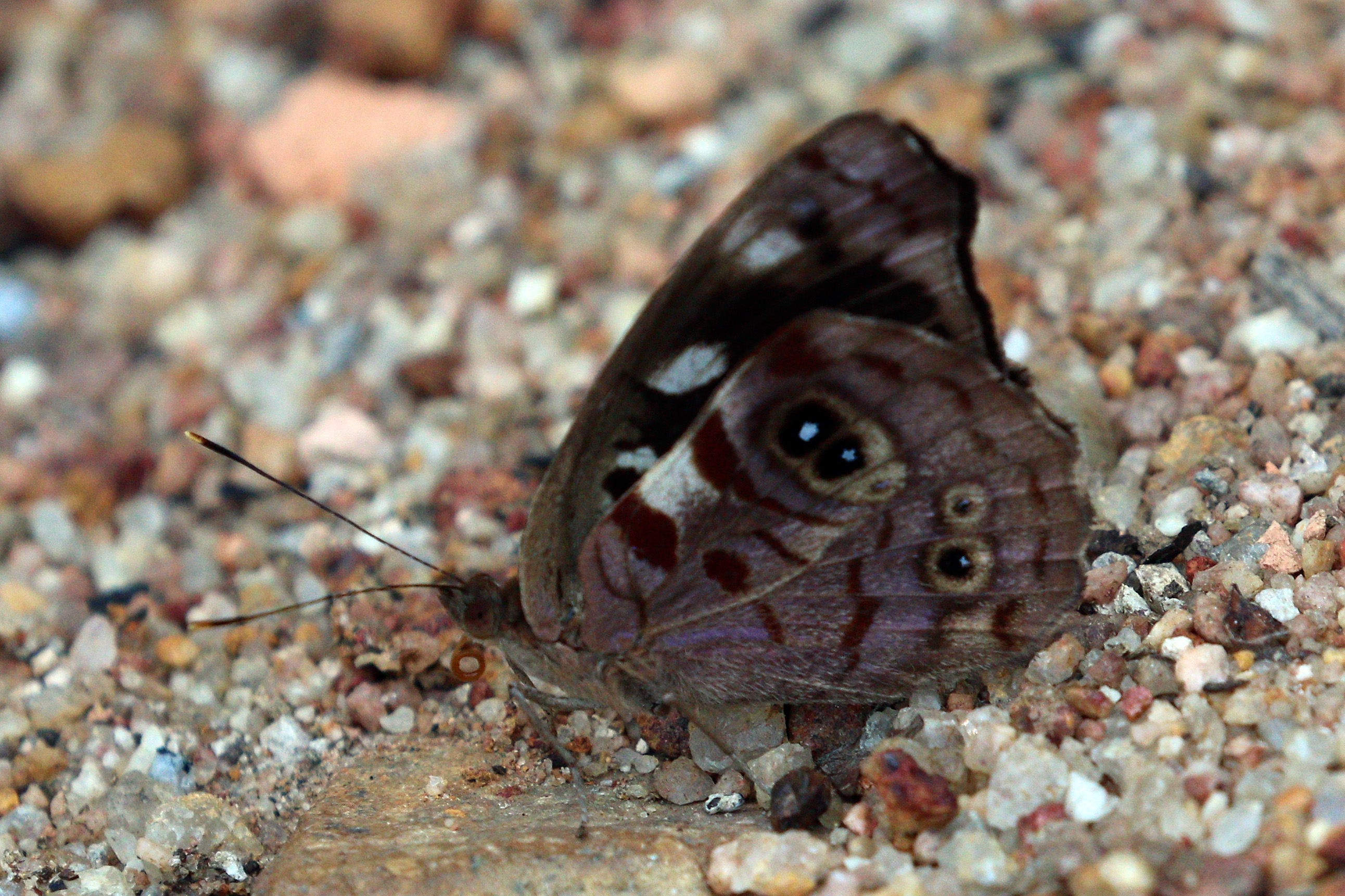
E. concordia, Cristalino River, Southern Amazon, Brazil

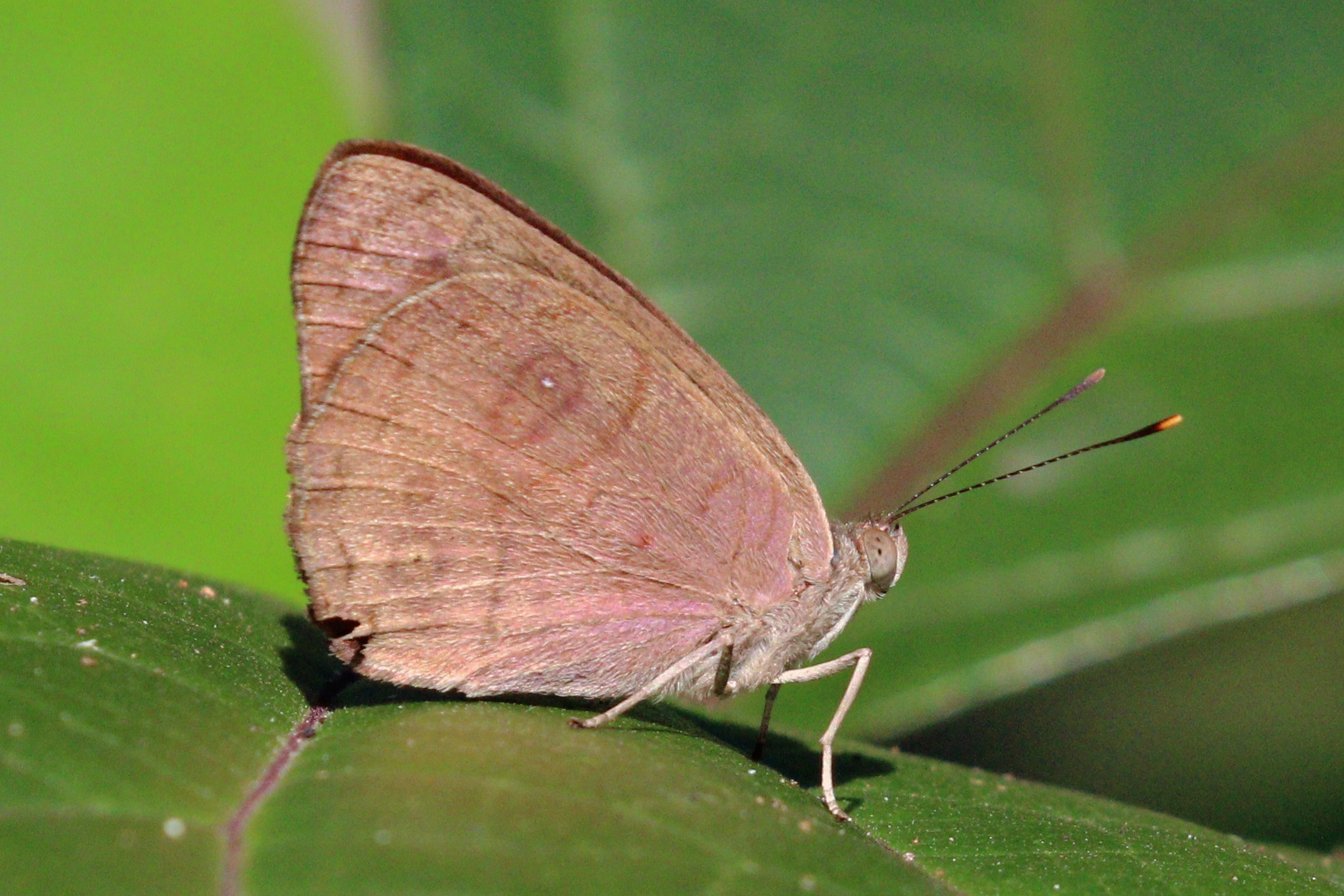
E. pusilla, Cristalino River, Southern Amazon, Brazil

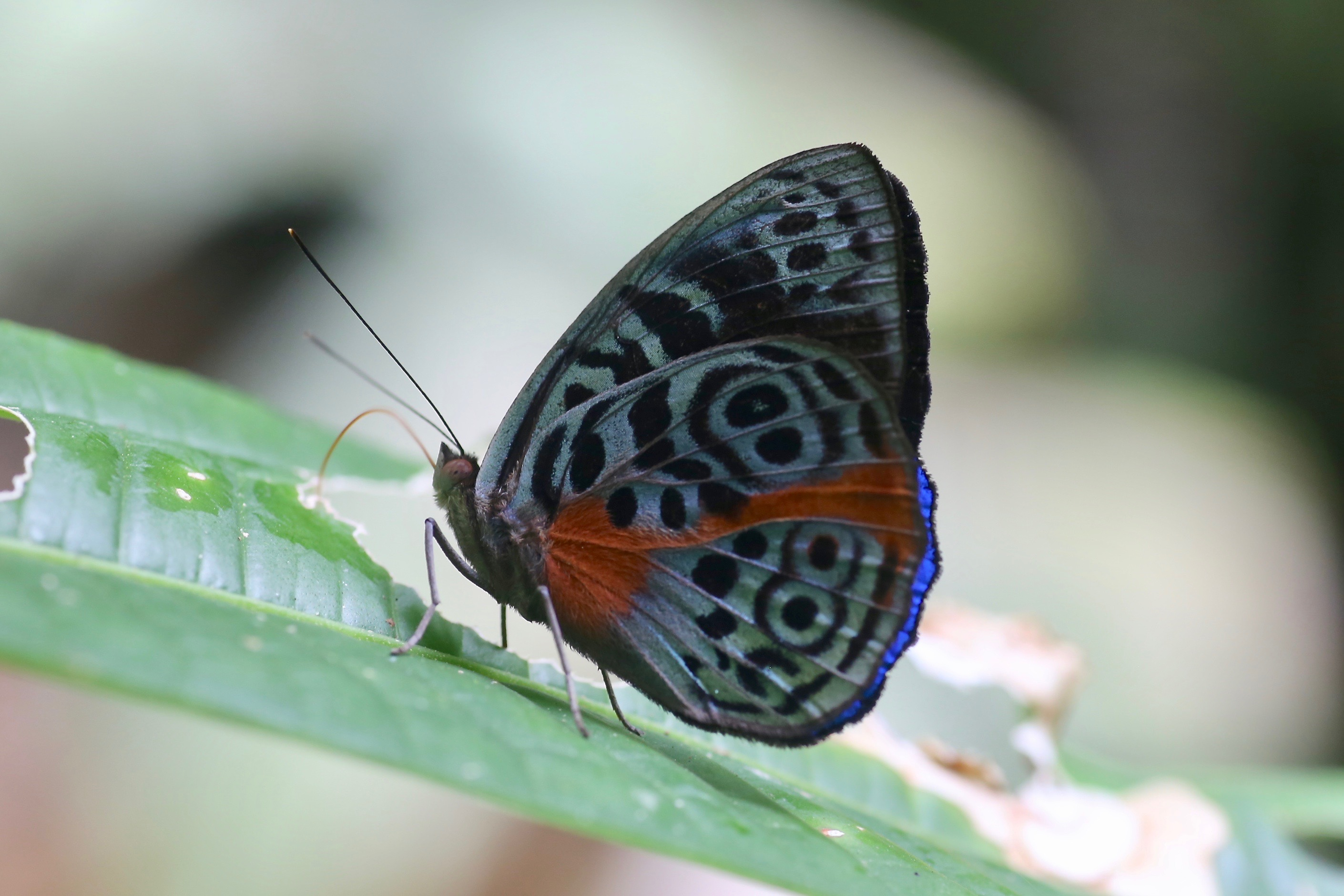
E. sophonisba, Jatun Sacha Biological Reserve, Puerto Misahuallí, Ecuador

The genus contains the following species, listed alphabetically:

- Eunica alpais (Godart, [1824])
- Eunica amelia (Cramer, [1777])
- Eunica amycla (Godart, [1824])
- Eunica anna (Cramer, 1780)
- Eunica araucana C. & R. Felder, 1862
- Eunica bechina (Hewitson, 1852)
- Eunica brunnea Salvin, 1869
- Eunica caelina (Godart, [1824])
- Eunica caralis (Hewitson, 1857)
- Eunica carias (Hewitson, 1857)
- Eunica chlorochroa (Salvin, 1869) - Mira purplewing
- Eunica clytia (Hewitson, 1852)
- Eunica concordia (Hewitson, 1852) – sandbar purplewing
- Eunica cuvierii (Godart, [1819]) – Cuvier's purplewing
- Eunica eburnea Fruhstorfer, 1907
- Eunica elegans Salvin, 1869
- Eunica eurota (Cramer, [1775])
- Eunica evelide Bates, 1864
- Eunica incognita Jenkins, 1990
- Eunica ingens Seitz, 1915
- Eunica interphasis Jenkins, 1990
- Eunica heraclites Gundlach, 1881
- Eunica macris (Godart, [1824])
- Eunica maja (Fabricius, 1775)
- Eunica malvina Bates, 1864 – Malvina purplewing
- Eunica margarita (Godart, [1824])
- Eunica marsolia (Godart, [1824])
- Eunica mira Godman & Salvin, 1877
- Eunica monima (Stoll, [1782]) - dingy purplewing
- Eunica mygdonia (Godart, [1824])
- Eunica norica (Hewitson, 1852) – Norica purplewing
- Eunica olympias C. & R. Felder, 1862
- Eunica orphise (Cramer, [1775])
- Eunica phasis C. & R. Felder, 1862
- Eunica pomona (C. & R. Felder, [1867]) – rounded purplewing
- Eunica pusilla Bates, 1864 - pusilla purplewing
- Eunica sophonisba (Cramer, [1782]) – glorious purplewing
- Eunica sydonia (Godart, [1824]) – Godart's purplewing
- Eunica tatila (Herrich-Schaeffer, [1855]) – Florida purplewing
- Eunica venusia (C. & R. Felder, 1867)
- Eunica veronica Bates, 1864
- Eunica viola Bates, 1864
- Eunica violetta Staudinger, [1885]
- Eunica volumna (Godart, [1824])
