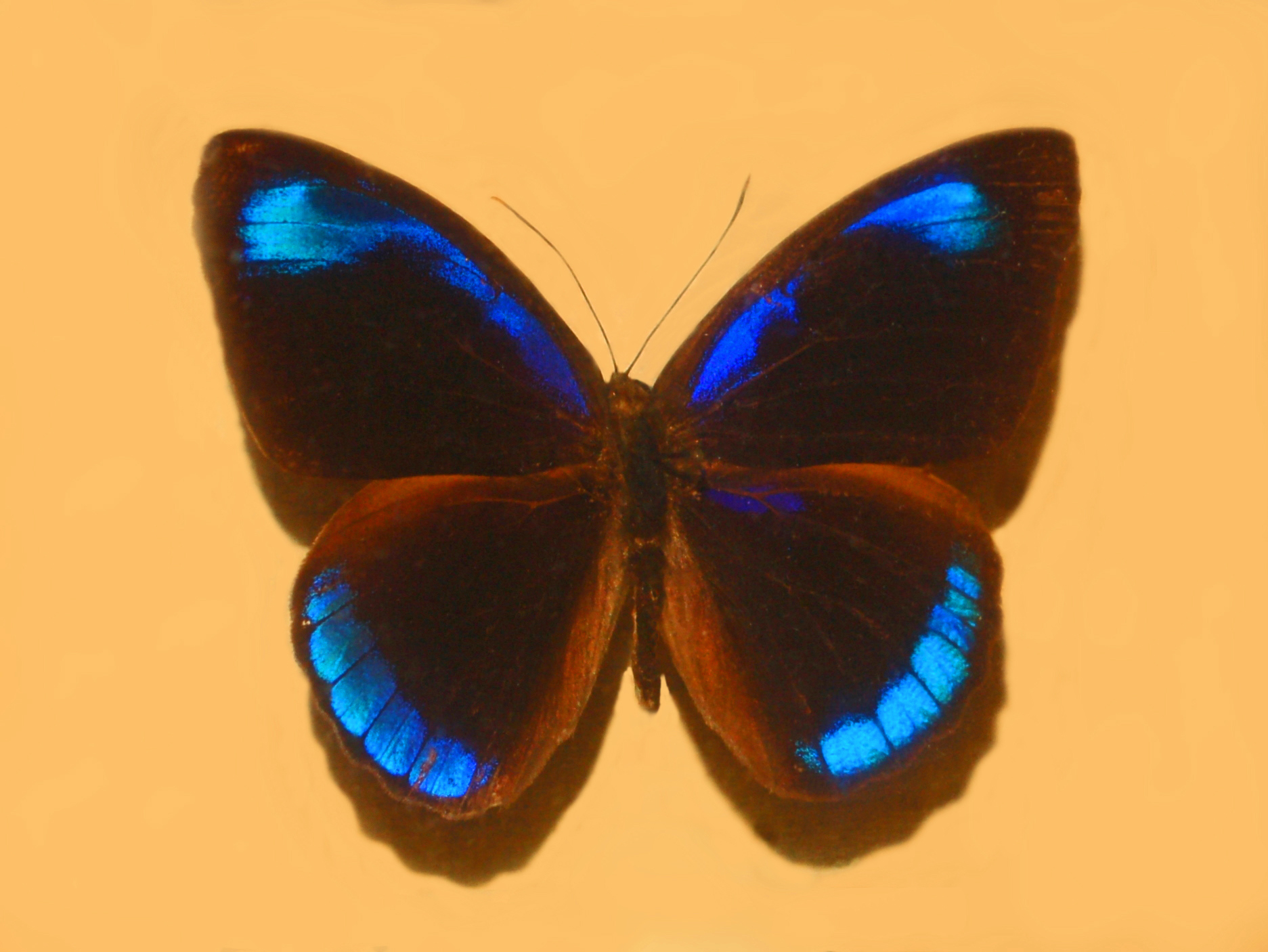
- Mounted specimen from Colombia

Scientific classification
- Domain: Eukaryota
- Kingdom: Animalia
- Phylum: Arthropoda
- Class: Insecta
- Order: Lepidoptera
- Family: Nymphalidae
- Genus: Eunica
- Species: E. pomona

Binomial name
- Eunica pomona (C. & R. Felder, [1867])

Synonyms
- Faunia pomona C. & R. Felder, 1867; Eunica pomona f. pompata Fruhstorfer, 1909; Eunica amata Druce, 1874

= Eunica pomona =

Rounded purplewing

Species of butterfly

Eunica pomona, the rounded purplewing, is a species of butterfly of the family Nymphalidae.

== Description ==
Eunica pomona has a wingspan of about 57 millimetres (2.2 in). The uppersides of the anterior wings are black, with a bright blue band from the base of the coastal margin to the apex. Posterior wings have a broad submarginal band of blue. The undersides of the anterior wings are brown, lighter at the base and the inner margin, while the apex is greyish. The posterior wings are dark brown with two black spots in the middle, followed by some irregular transverse dark brown bands.

== Distribution ==
This species occurs in Venezuela, Colombia, Costa Rica, and Panama.

== Subspecies ==
- Eunica pomona pomona (Colombia)
- Eunica pomona amata Druce, 1874 (Costa Rica, Panama)
