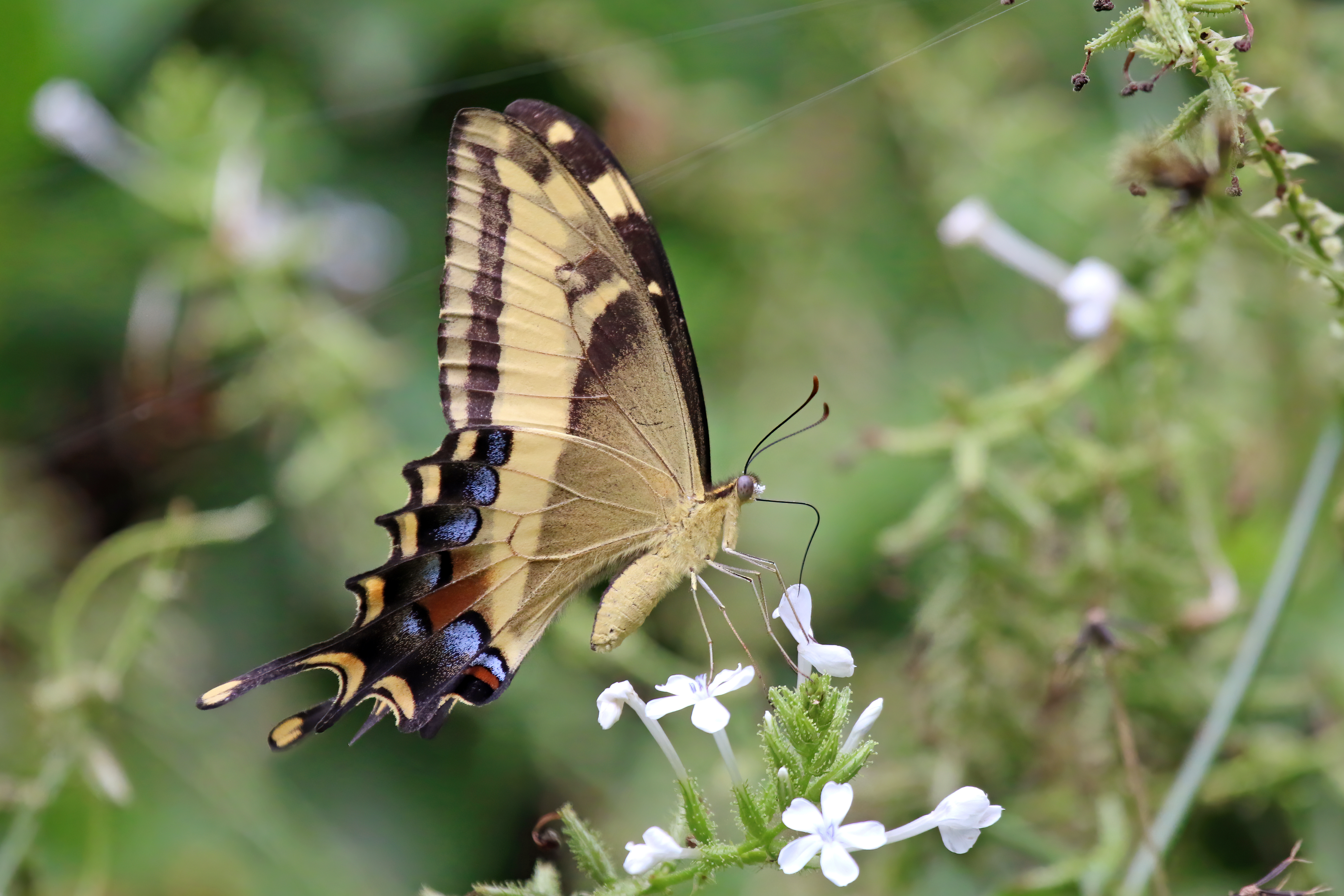
- P. a. andraemon, Jamaica

Scientific classification
- Kingdom: Animalia
- Phylum: Arthropoda
- Clade: Pancrustacea
- Class: Insecta
- Order: Lepidoptera
- Family: Papilionidae
- Genus: Papilio
- Species: P. andraemon

Binomial name
- Papilio andraemon (Hübner, [1823])

Synonyms
- Heraclides andraemon Hübner, [1823]

= Papilio andraemon =

Species of butterfly

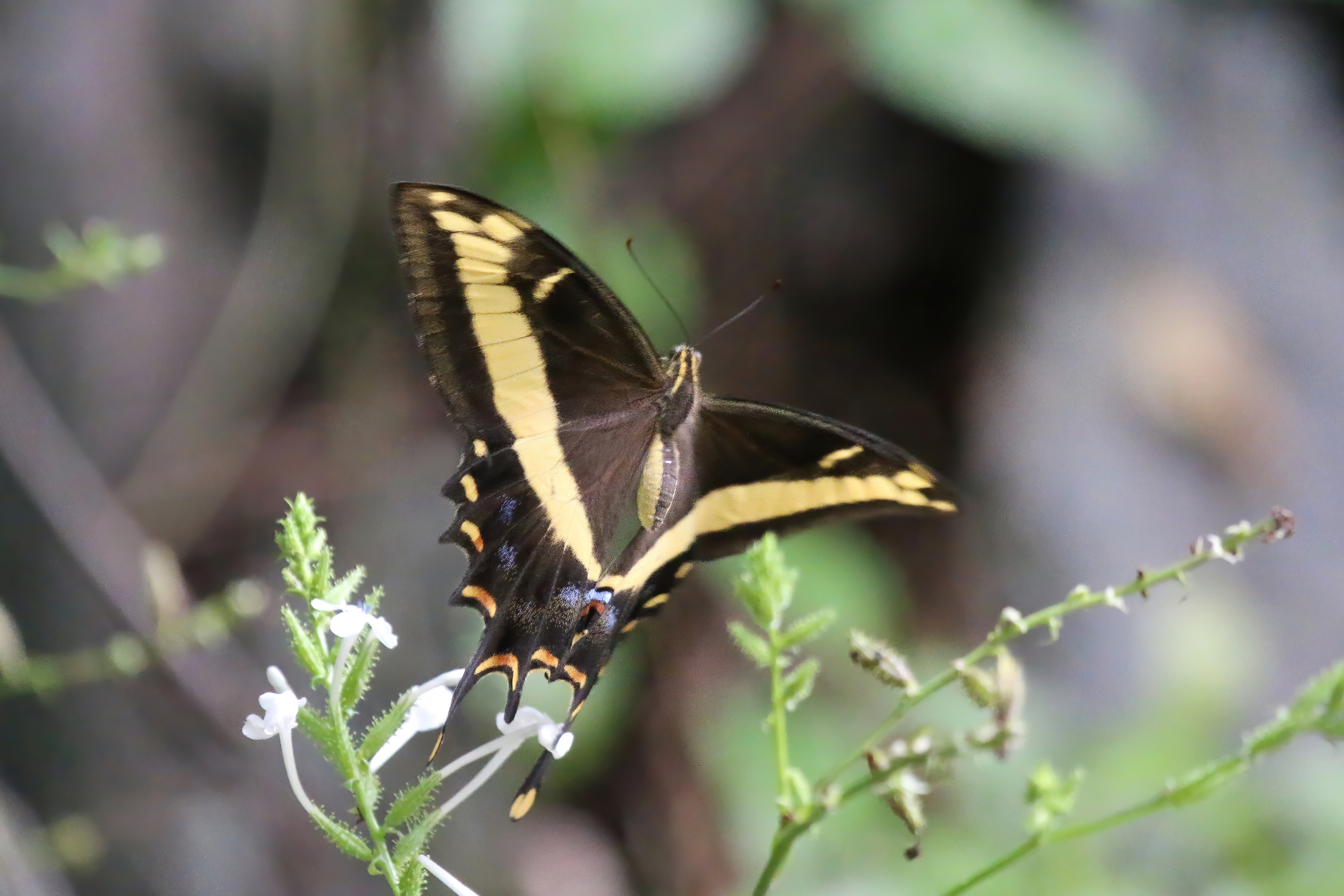
In flight

Papilio andraemon, the Bahaman swallowtail, is a swallowtail butterfly of the subfamily Papilioninae. It is found on the Bahamas, Cuba, Jamaica and the Cayman Islands. It is a rare stray or temporary colonist of the Florida Keys or the mainland near Miami.

== Description ==
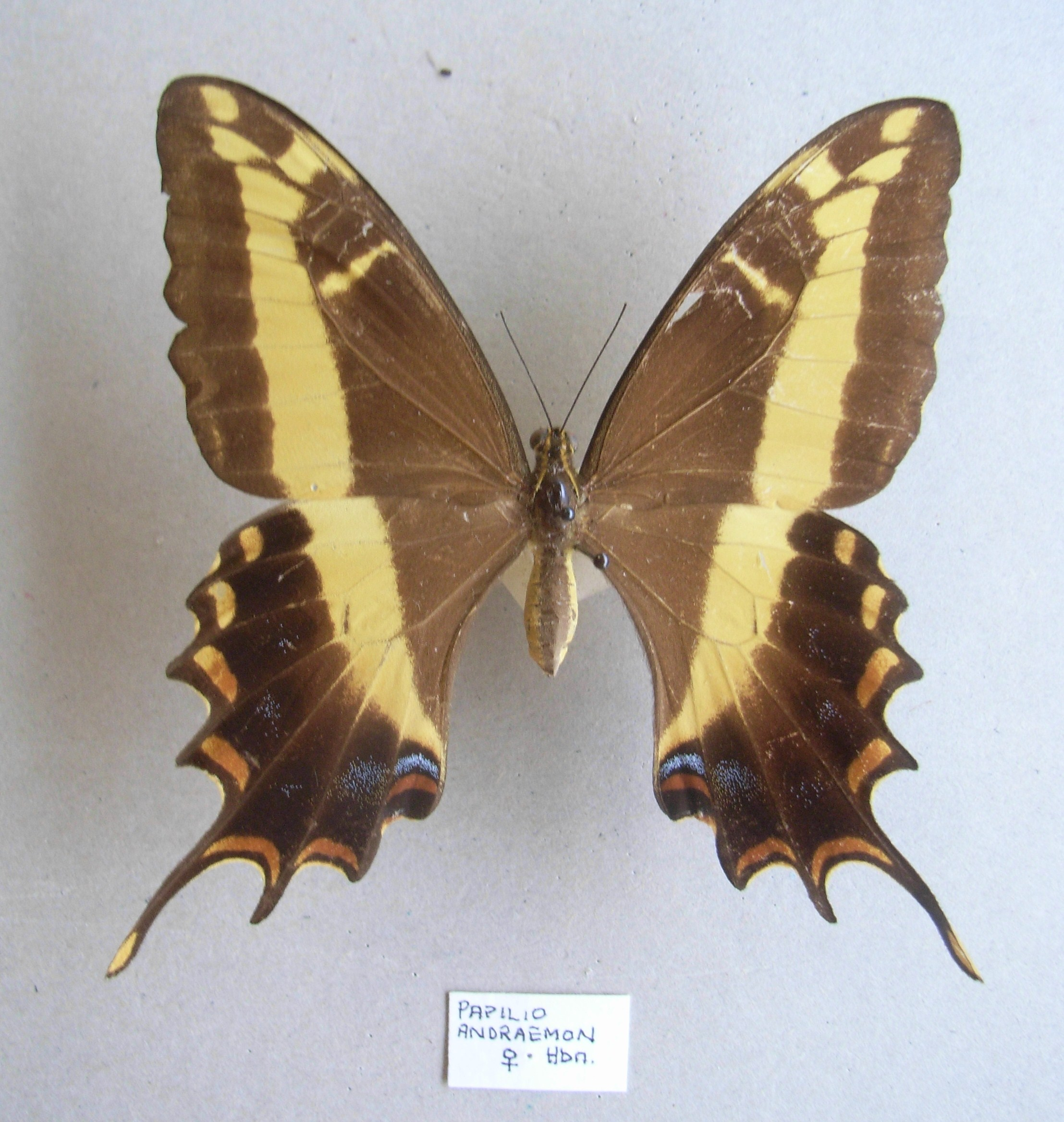
Set specimen of female

The wingspan is 96–102 millimetres (3.8–4.0 in). On the obverse the wings are black. The forewings have a pale yellow band and a thin band of the same colour in the wing cell. The hindwings are extended by long thin tails slightly widened at the tip and bear a pale yellow band which extends that of the forewing, submarginal yellow and orange lunules, a brick red ocellus surmounted by an iridescent blue lunule in the anal angle and diffuse iridescent blue lunules in the submarginal part. On the reverse, the wings bear the same patterns in lighter colours, the submarginal blue lunules are more numerous and more marked, the hind wings also bear a reddish macula in the submarginal part. The body is pale yellow and the top is black.

== Biology ==
Adults are on wing from April to October (December in Jamaica) in three generations per year.

The larvae feed on various species in the family Rutaceae, including Citrus, Ruta and Zanthoxylum species.

== Subspecies ==
- Papilio andraemon andraemon (Florida, Cuba, Jamaica, Little Cayman and Cayman Brac (Cayman Islands))
- Papilio andraemon bonhotei Sharpe, 1900 (Bahamas)
- Papilio andraemon tailori Rothschild & Jordan, 1906 (Grand Cayman, Cayman Islands)

== Taxonomy ==
Papilio andraemon is a member of the Papilio thoas species group.

== See also ==
- List of butterflies of Jamaica
