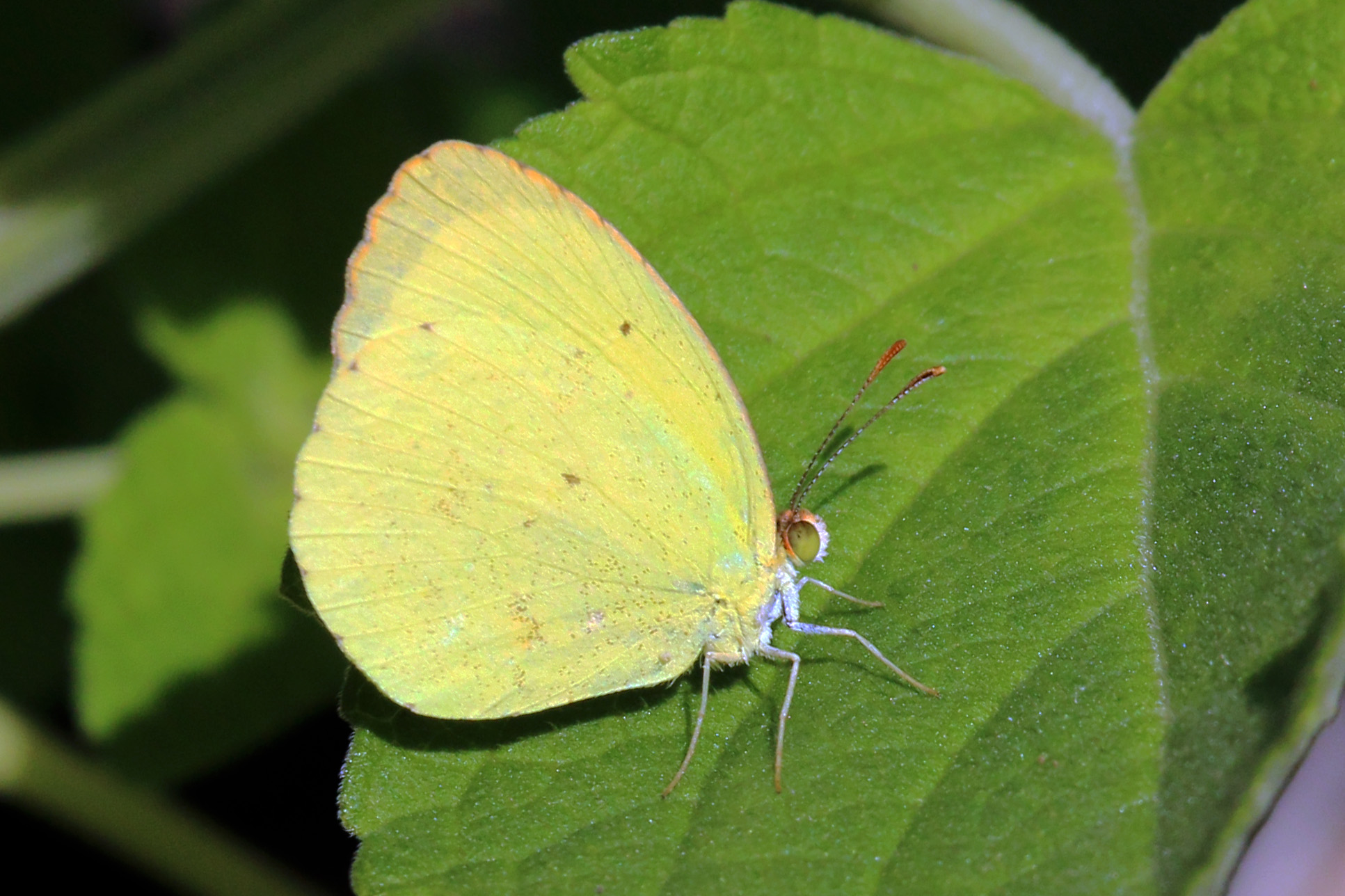
- Pyrisitia nise nise, Jamaica

Conservation status
- Secure (NatureServe)

Scientific classification
- Kingdom: Animalia
- Phylum: Arthropoda
- Clade: Pancrustacea
- Class: Insecta
- Order: Lepidoptera
- Family: Pieridae
- Genus: Eurema
- Species: E. nise

Binomial name
- Eurema nise (Cramer, [1775])

Synonyms
- Papilio nise Cramer, [1775]; Pieris neda Godart, 1819; Eurema nise; Eurema neda; Eurema sulla Weymer, 1890; Terias porteri d'Almeida, 1930; Terias joannisi Dufrane, 1947; Terias joannisi ab. minor Dufrane, 1947; Terias joannisi ab. marginata Dufrane, 1947; Terias joannisi ab. obliterata Dufrane, 1947; Terias tenella Boisduval, 1836; Terias nisella Felder, 1862; Terias perimede Prittwitz, 1865; Terias tenella ab. alcides d'Almeida, 1913; Terias tenella f. germana d'Almeida, 1921; Terias tenella f. jacarepaguana d'Almeida, 1921; Terias tenella f. panopea d'Almeida, 1921; Terias lepidula d'Almeida, 1921; Terias thymetus f. cordobensis Köhler, 1923; Terias tenella ab. cissa d'Almeida, 1928; Terias thymetus f. formosanus Jörgensen, 1935; Eurema larae f. ricardi Torre & Alayo, 1953; Terias nelphe R. Felder, 1869; Eurema venustula Staudinger, 1876; Terias linda Edwards, 1884; Terias neda f. fusca Giacomelli, 1915; Terias tenella ab. argia d'Almeida, 1928; Eurema frieda Baumann & Reissinger, 1969; Eurema frieda f. discopunctata Baumann & Reissinger, 1969

= Pyrisitia nise =

Species of butterfly

Pyrisitia nise, the mimosa yellow, is a butterfly in the family Pieridae. It is found from Argentina north to the Texas Gulf Coast and throughout central and southern Florida, northward to the Tennessee Valley. It is an occasional stray to central Texas and south-eastern Arizona and rarely to southern California, southern Colorado and Kansas. The habitat consists of brushy woodland edges.

The wingspan is 29–51 mm (1.1–2.0 in). Both sexes are yellow. The upperside of the forewing has narrow black outer edges. Black margins of the hindwing are uncommon in males, but always absent in females. Adults are on wing from May to August in southern Florida, September to November in southern Texas and all year round in the tropics. Adults feed on flower nectar.

The larvae feed on Mimosa pudica.

== Subspecies ==
The following subspecies are recognized:

- P. n. nise (Jamaica)
- P. n. stygma (Boisduval, 1836) (Peru, Ecuador)
- P. n. tenella (Boisduval, 1836) (Brazil: Rio de Janeiro, Argentina, Paraguay)
- P. n. larae (Herrich-Schäffer, 1862) (Cuba)
- P. n. nelphe (R. Felder, 1869) (Mexico, Panama)
- P. n. floscula (Weeks, 1901) (Bolivia, Argentina, Peru)
