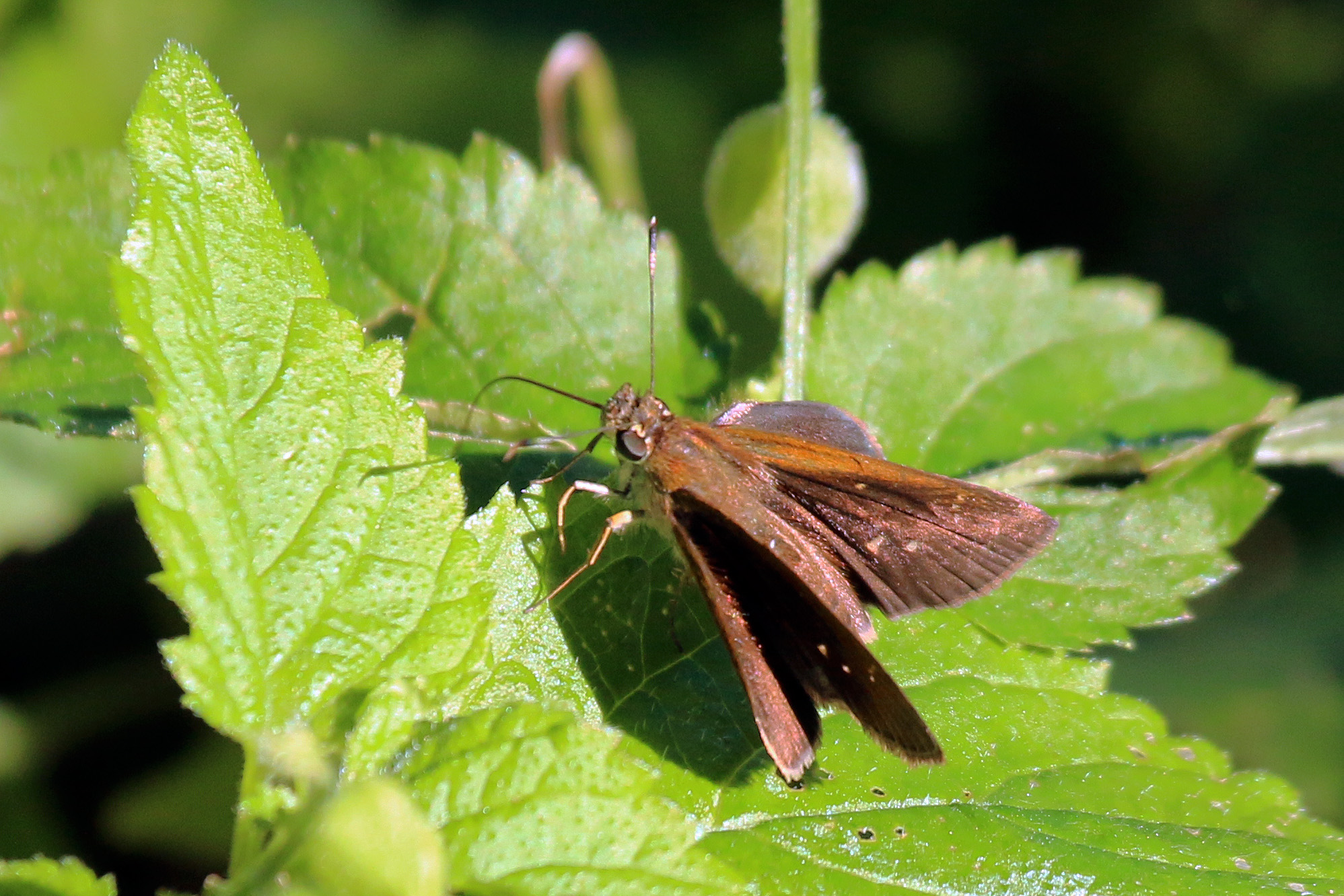
- Branded skipper, R. cubana cubana, Jamaica

Scientific classification
- Kingdom: Animalia
- Phylum: Arthropoda
- Class: Insecta
- Order: Lepidoptera
- Family: Hesperiidae
- Subtribe: Moncina
- Genus: Rhinthon; Godman, [1900]

= Rhinthon (butterfly) =

Genus of butterflies

Rhinthon is a genus of skippers in the family Hesperiidae.

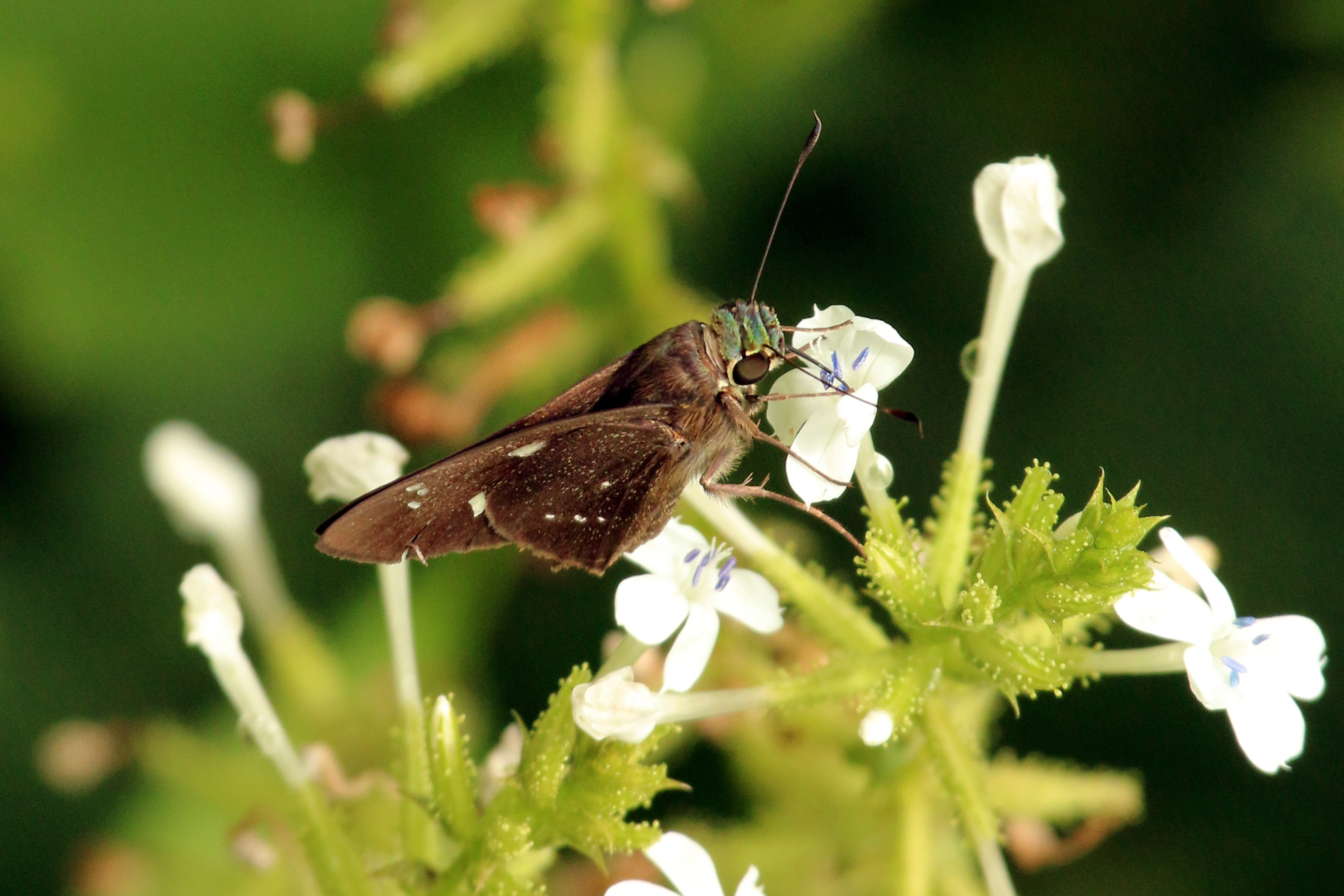
Osca skipper, R. cubana osca, Tobago

== Species ==
Recognised species in the genus Rhinthon include:

- Rhinthon bajula (Schaus, 1902)
- Rhinthon braesia (Hewitson, 1867)
- Rhinthon cubana (Herrich-Schäffer, 1865)
- Rhinthon molion Godman, 1901
- Rhinthon osca Plötz, 1882

=== Former species ===
- Rinthon [sic] advena Draudt, 1923 - transferred to Tricrista advena (Draudt, 1923)
