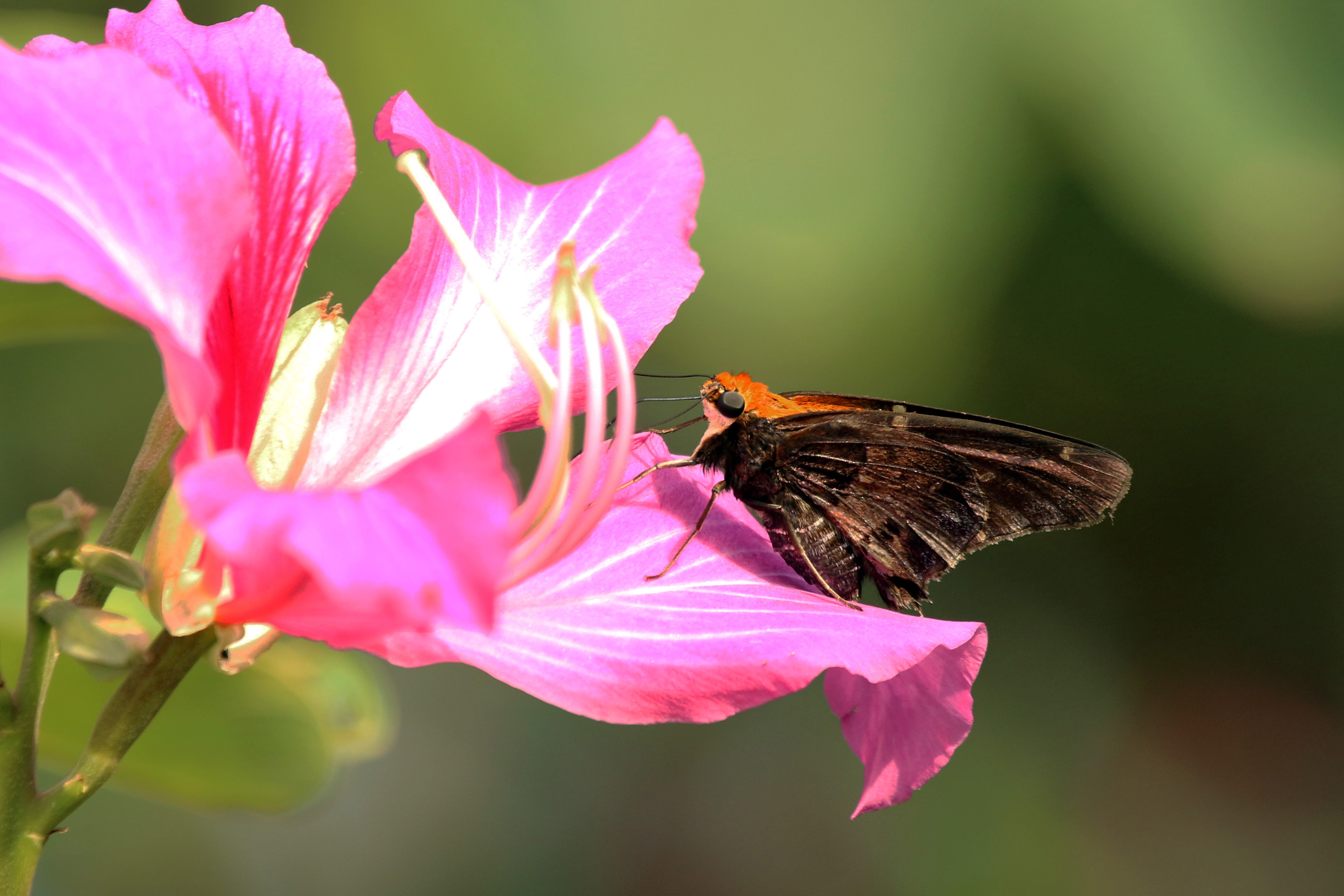
- Mercurial skipper (P. mercurius jamaicensis), Jamaica

Scientific classification
- Kingdom: Animalia
- Phylum: Arthropoda
- Class: Insecta
- Order: Lepidoptera
- Family: Hesperiidae
- Subfamily: Eudaminae
- Genus: Proteides; Hübner, [1819]

Synonyms
- Dicranaspis Mabille, 1878

= Proteides =

Genus of skipper butterflies

Proteides is a Neotropical genus of spread-winged skipper butterflies in the family Hesperiidae.

== Species ==
The following two species are recognised in the genus Proteides

- Proteides maysi (Lucas, 1857) Cuba
- Proteides mercurius (Fabricius, 1787) South America, Arizona
  - P. m. mercurius French Guiana, Suriname
  - P. m. sanantonio (Lucas, 1857) Cuba
  - P. m. angasi Godman & Salvin, 1884 Dominica
  - P. m. pedro (Dewitz, 1877) Puerto Rico
  - P. m. jamaicensis Skinner, 1920 Jamaica
  - P. m. sanchesi Bell & Comstock, 1948 Haiti
  - P. m. vincenti Bell & Comstock, 1948 Saint Vincent
  - P. m. grenadensis Enrico & Pinchon, 1969 Grenada

=== Former species ===
- Proteides modius Mabille, 1889 - transferred to Thoon modius (Mabille, 1889)
