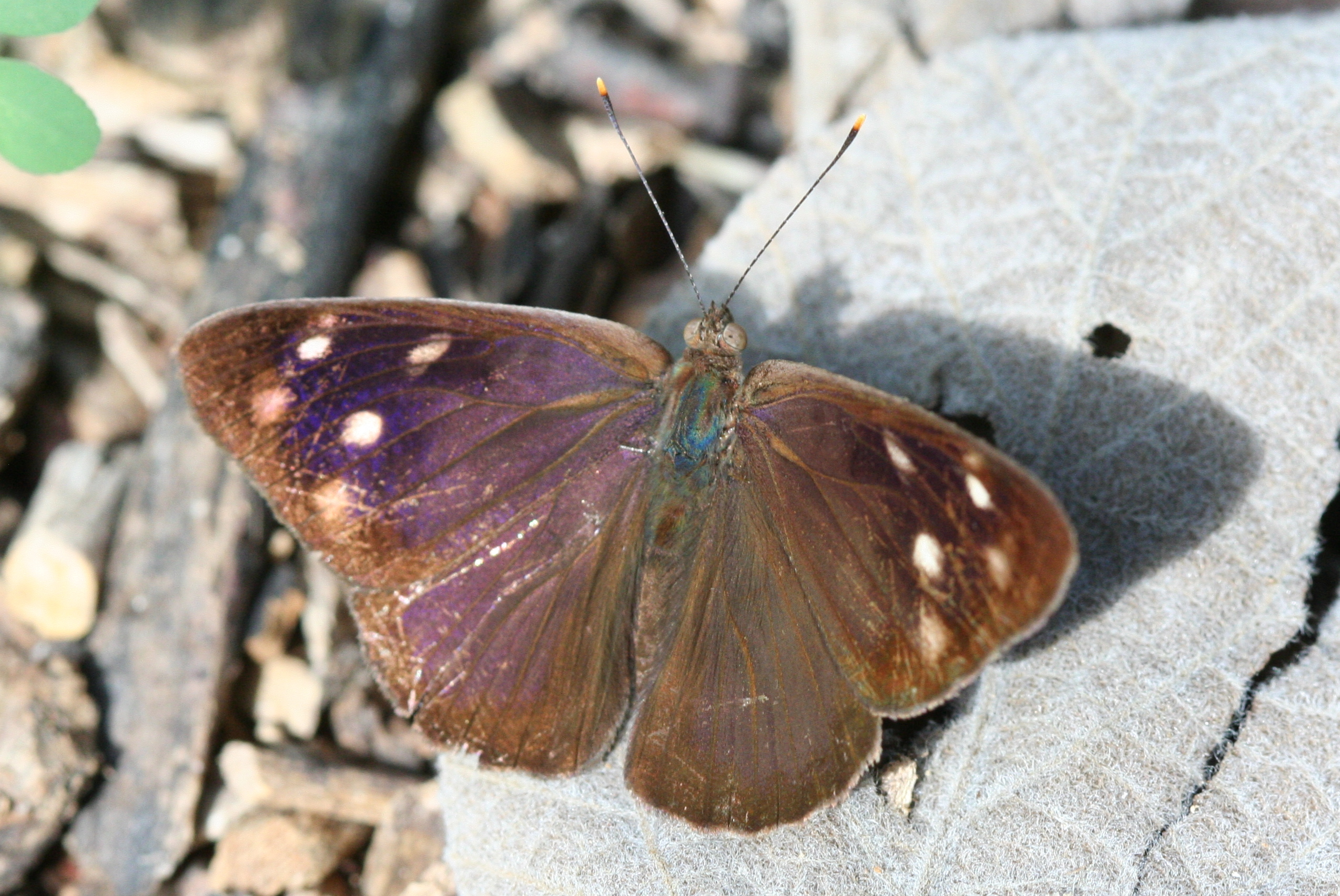

Scientific classification
- Domain: Eukaryota
- Kingdom: Animalia
- Phylum: Arthropoda
- Class: Insecta
- Order: Lepidoptera
- Family: Nymphalidae
- Subfamily: Biblidinae
- Tribe: Epicaliini
- Genus: Eunica
- Species: E. monima

Binomial name
- Eunica monima (Stoll, 1782)

Synonyms
- Eunica myrto Godart, 1823; Papilio monima Stoll, 1782

= Eunica monima =

Species of butterfly

Eunica monima, the dingy purplewing, is a species of tropical brushfoot in the family Nymphalidae, and was described by Caspar Stoll in 1782. It is found in North America.

The MONA or Hodges number for Eunica monima is 4532.
