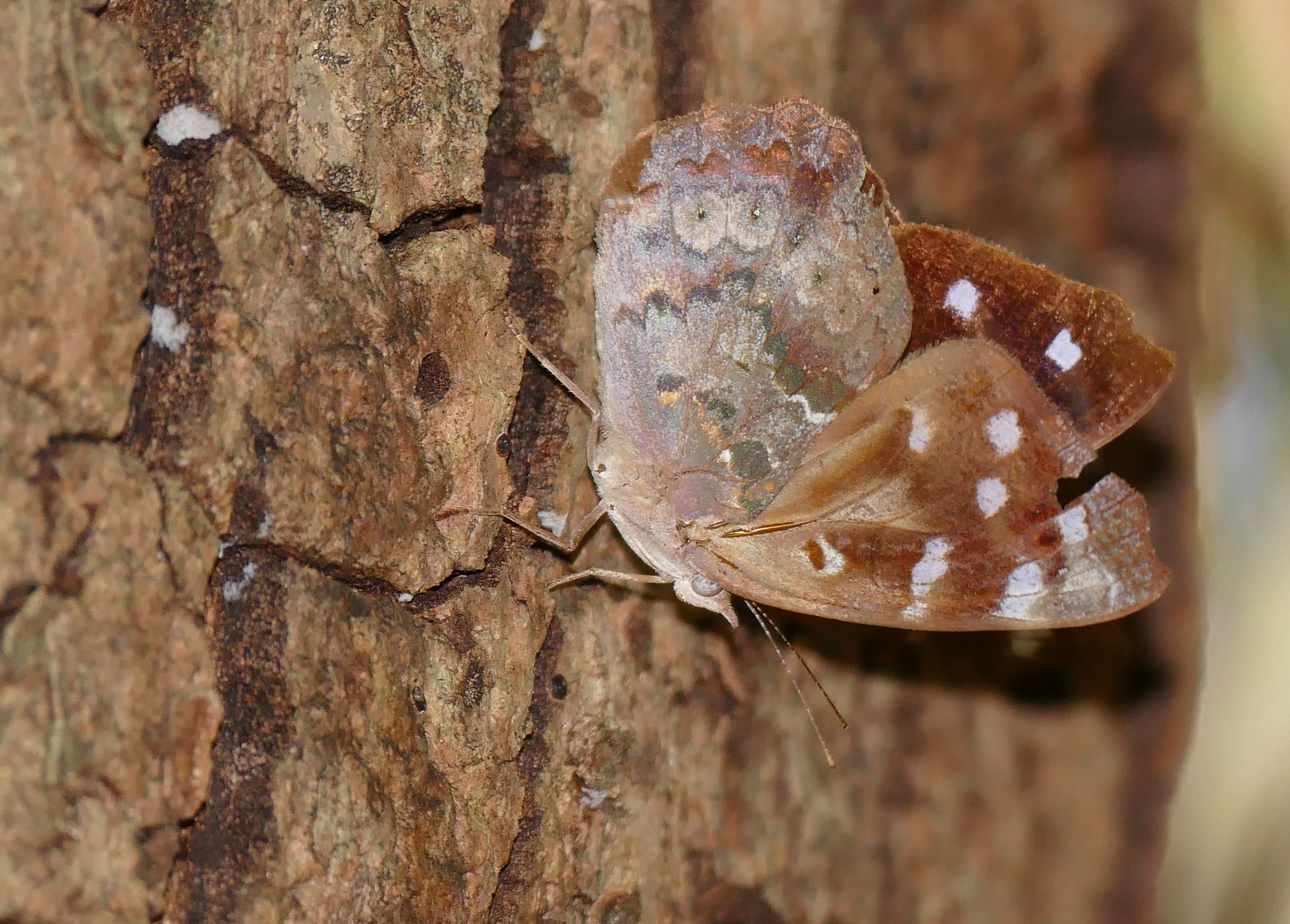

Scientific classification
- Domain: Eukaryota
- Kingdom: Animalia
- Phylum: Arthropoda
- Class: Insecta
- Order: Lepidoptera
- Family: Nymphalidae
- Tribe: Epicaliini
- Genus: Eunica
- Species: E. tatila

Binomial name
- Eunica tatila (Herrich-Schaffer, 1855)

= Eunica tatila =

Species of butterfly

Eunica tatila, the Florida purplewing, is a species of tropical brushfoot in the butterfly family Nymphalidae. It is found in the Americas from southern Texas and southern Florida down through Argentina.

The MONA or Hodges number for Eunica tatila is 4533.

== Subspecies ==
These four subspecies belong to the species Eunica tatila:

- Eunica tatila bellaria Fruhstorfer, 1908
- Eunica tatila cerula Godman & Salvin, 1877
- Eunica tatila tatila (Herrich-Schäffer, 1855)
- Eunica tatila tatilista Kaye, 1926
