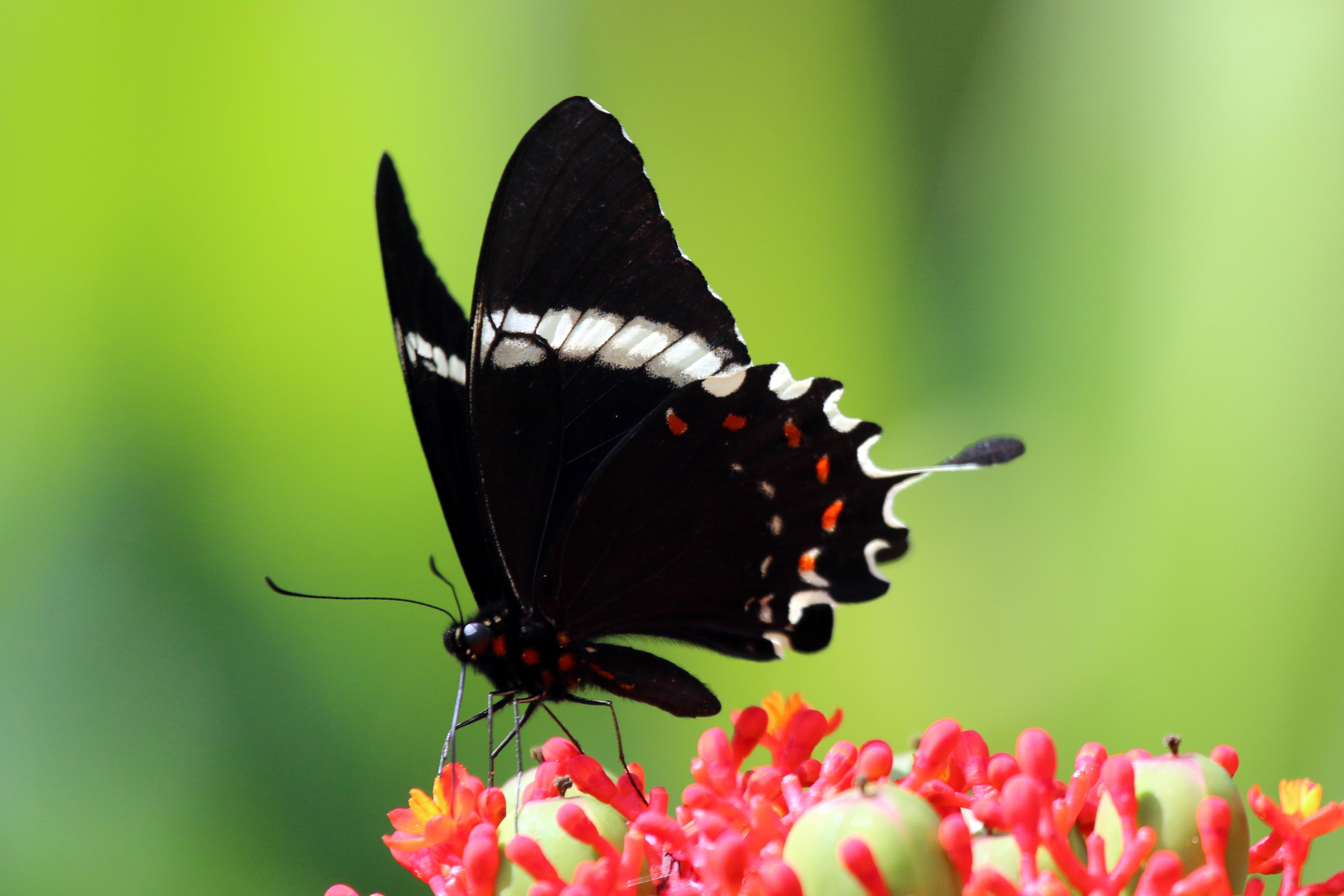
- P. p. pelaus at Strawberry Hill, Jamaica

Scientific classification
- Kingdom: Animalia
- Phylum: Arthropoda
- Clade: Pancrustacea
- Class: Insecta
- Order: Lepidoptera
- Family: Papilionidae
- Genus: Papilio
- Species: P. pelaus

Binomial name
- Papilio pelaus Fabricius, 1775

Synonyms
- Papilio ornofagus Weidemeyer, 1863; Papilio imerius Godart, 1819; Papilio augias Ménétriés, 1832; Heraclides pelaus (Fabricius, 1775)

= Papilio pelaus =

Species of butterfly

Papilio pelaus, the prickly ash swallowtail, is a species of Neotropical swallowtail butterfly found in Jamaica, Hispaniola, Cuba and Puerto Rico.

== Description ==
There are few differences between the sexes, the markings of the female are only a little wider and more numerous than those of the male. The body is black with some red dots. The forewings are black with a white median stripe on the obverse and underside. The hindwings are extended by a spatula-shaped tail and have white markings on the edge as well as a row of red and white lunulae, which are more numerous in the female. The forewing often has a row of small white dots on the underside.

Seitz- With spatulate tail. Sexes similar, but the markings in the female somewhat enlarged and on the hindwing more numerous than in the male. Black, forewing with oblique white band from the costa to the anal angle: hindwing with complete (female) or incomplete (male) row of pale red submarginal spots: beneath there are usually also small discal spots present, which sometimes in the female also occur above.

== Subspecies ==
- Papilio pelaus pelaus (Jamaica)
- Papilio pelaus imerius Godart, 1819 (Hispaniola) the band of the forewing is narrower anteriorly, on the other hand its last spot is on the whole broader than in the nominate and the spots on the hindwing are smaller.
- Papilio pelaus atkinsi Bates, 1935 (Cuba)
- Papilio pelaus puertoricoensis (Möhn, 1999) (Puerto Rico)

== Taxonomy ==
Papilio pelaus is a member of the anchisiades species group

== See also ==
- List of butterflies of Jamaica
