= Troyus turneri =

Scientific classification
- Kingdom: Animalia
- Phylum: Arthropoda
- Clade: Pancrustacea
- Class: Insecta
- Order: Lepidoptera
- Family: Hesperiidae
- Genus: Troyus
- Species: T. turneri

Binomial name
- Troyus turneri Warren & Turland, 2012

Species of butterfly

Troyus turneri, or Turner's skipper, is a butterfly found in Jamaica.

The wingspan is about 10 mm.
