= Chionodes mariona =

Scientific classification
- Kingdom: Animalia
- Phylum: Arthropoda
- Clade: Pancrustacea
- Class: Insecta
- Order: Lepidoptera
- Family: Gelechiidae
- Genus: Chionodes
- Species: C. mariona

Binomial name
- Chionodes mariona (Heinrich, 1921)

Synonyms
- Telphusa mariona Heinrich, 1921

Species of moth

Chionodes mariona is a moth in the family Gelechiidae. It is found in North America, where it has been recorded from Arizona, southern Texas and Mexico.

The wingspan is 9–10 mm. The forewings are glossy black with two conspicuous cream-colored spots. The first one has the form of a short triangular dash on the outer third of the costa, while the other is an irregular spot of about the same size on the dorsum just beyond the middle. The hindwings are smoky fuscous.

The larvae feed on Abutilon incanum, Abutilon berlandieri, Malvastrum (including Malvastrum coromandelianum), Sida and Wissadula species. Full-grown larvae reach a length of 6.5–7 mm. They have a yellowish white body with a subdorsal and a lateral longitudinal row of large red blotches and a longitudinal row of smaller red spots.
