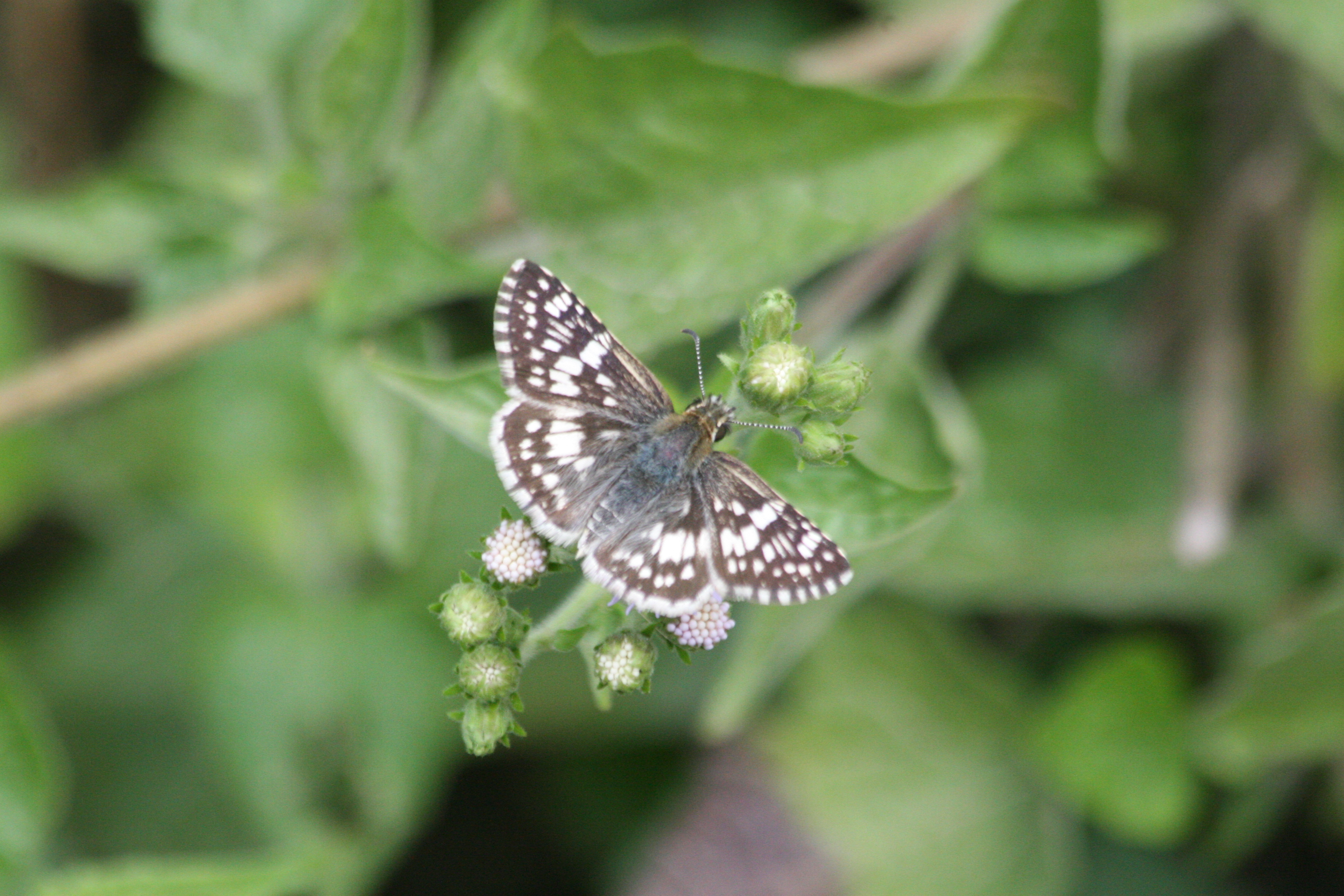

Scientific classification
- Kingdom: Animalia
- Phylum: Arthropoda
- Class: Insecta
- Order: Lepidoptera
- Family: Hesperiidae
- Subfamily: Pyrginae
- Tribe: Pyrgini
- Genus: Burnsius
- Species: B. albezens

Binomial name
- Burnsius albezens Grishin, 2022

Synonyms
- Burnsius albescens (Plötz, 1884); Pyrgus albescens Plötz, 1884

= Burnsius albezens =

White checkered-skipper

Species of butterfly genus Burnsius

Burnsius albezens, the white checkered-skipper, formerly known as Burnsius albescens and Pyrgus albescens, is a species of skipper (family Hesperiidae). It is found at low altitudes in the southern United States (southern California, southern Arizona, southern New Mexico, western and southern Texas - Florida) and Mexico. It is a rare stray to southwest Utah and central Texas and is found in a variety of dry, open habitats.

The wingspan is 25–38 mm. Adults are on wing year round in most of its range.

The larva probably feed on several plants in the family Malvaceae, including Sphaeralcea, Abutilon and Callirhoe. Adults feed on the nectar of a variety of plants.
