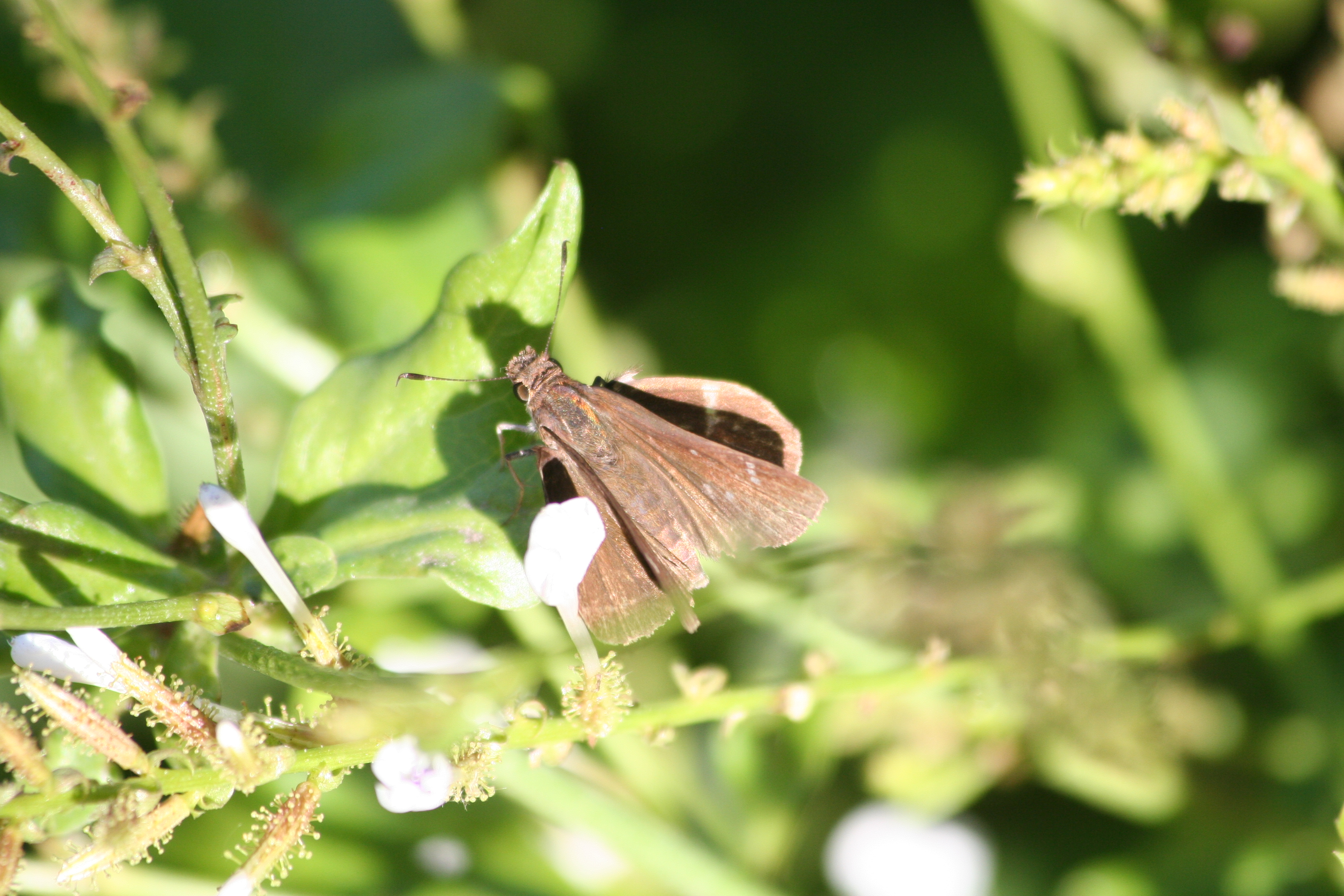
- Quasimellana eulogius

Scientific classification
- Kingdom: Animalia
- Phylum: Arthropoda
- Class: Insecta
- Order: Lepidoptera
- Family: Hesperiidae
- Subfamily: Hesperiinae
- Genus: Quasimellana; Burns, 1994

= Quasimellana =

Genus of butterflies

Quasimellana is a genus of skippers in the family Hesperiidae with a distribution in South America and southern North America.

== Taxonomy ==
Within family Hesperiidae, Quasimellana is placed in tribe Hesperiini.

The genus was erected in 1994 by John Burns, containing at the time of description three species groups and twenty-four species, five of which (Quasimellana andersoni, Q. antipazina, Q. imperfida, Q. mielkei and Q. siblinga) were first described in the same publication. The remaining nineteen species were previously described in different genera. Quasimellana mexicana, originally described as Atrytone mexicana, is the designated type species of the genus.

== Distribution ==
Distribution of the genus is from northern Argentina to the southern United States. Fourteen species are known to occur in North America.

== Appearance ==
Male wingspan ranges from 11.4 to 17.9 mm, with most species averaging between 14 and 16 mm. Females are on average larger than males of the same species. The eulogius group, with exception of Q. mulleri, shows strong sexual dimorphism, while such dimorphism is highly variable from species to species within the sethos and nicomedes groups. The dorsal side of males of group eulogius is always yellow-orange with brown-black and dark venation.

== Species ==
The following species were assigned to Quasimellana by John Burns in 1994, with taxonomical changes since being referenced separately:

=== Species group eulogius ===
Predominantly North American in distribution, with a full range from the southern US to Brazil and Paraguay.

- Quasimellana mexicana (E. Bell, 1942)
- Quasimellana eulogius (Plötz, 1882)
- Quasimellana siblinga Burns, 1994
- Quasimellana balsa (E. Bell, 1942)
- Quasimellana mulleri (E. Bell, 1942)

=== Species group sethos ===
Equal distribution in North and South America, with a range from Mexico to Brazil and Bolivia.

- Quasimellana aurora (E. Bell, 1942)
- Quasimellana nayana (E. Bell, 1941)
- Quasimellana noka(Evans, [1955])
- Quasimellana pazina (Evans, [1955])
- Quasimellana antipazina Burns, 1994
- Quasimellana sista (Evans, [1955])
- Quasimellana andersoni Burns, 1994
- Quasimellana sethos (Mabille, 1889)
- Quasimellana myron (Godman, 1900)
- Quasimellana verba (Evans, [1955]) - now Quasimellana servilius (Möschler, 1883)
- Quasimellana inconspicua (Hayward, 1950)
- Quasimellana angra (Evans, [1955])

=== Species group nicomedes ===
Distribution largely South American, with a full range from Mexico to Argentina.

- Quasimellana amicus (E. Bell, 1942)
- Quasimellana fieldi (E. Bell, 1942)
- Quasimellana nicomedes (Mabille, 1883)
- Quasimellana imperfida Burns, 1994
- Quasimellana mielkei Burns, 1994
- Quasimellana meridiani (Hayward, 1934)
- Quasimellana pandora (Hayward, 1940)
