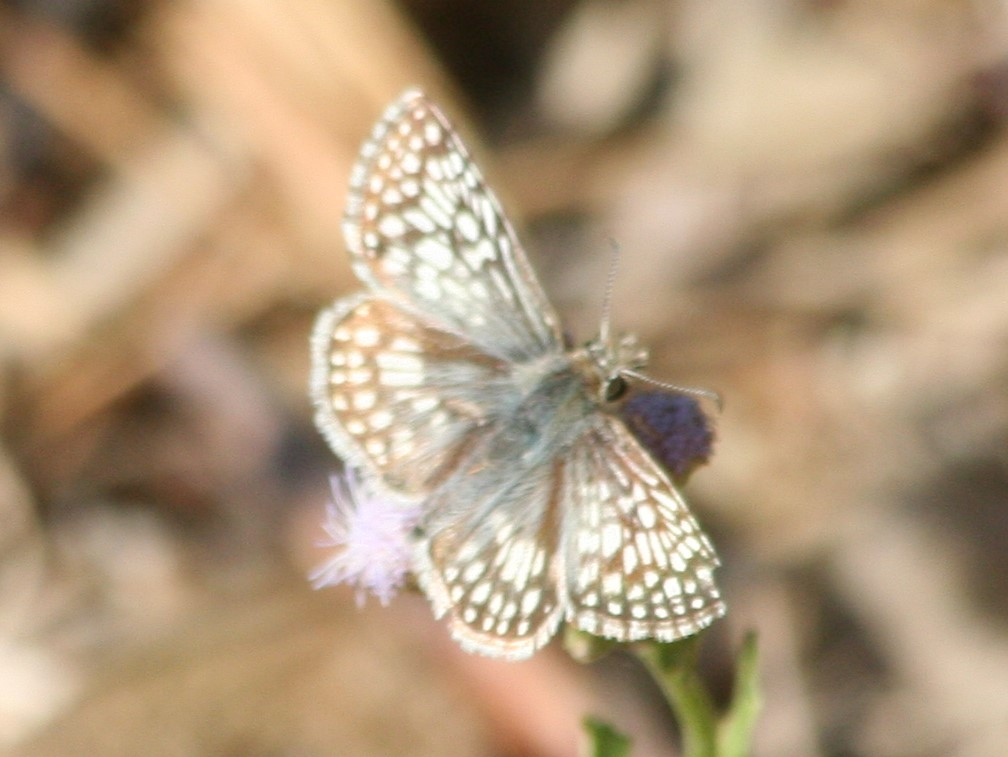

Scientific classification
- Domain: Eukaryota
- Kingdom: Animalia
- Phylum: Arthropoda
- Class: Insecta
- Order: Lepidoptera
- Family: Hesperiidae
- Genus: Burnsius
- Species: B. philetas

Binomial name
- Burnsius philetas (Edwards, 1881)

Synonyms
- Pyrgus philetas Edwards, 1881; Pyrgus philletas Díaz, 1991 (missp.); Hesperia philetas Dyar, 1903

= Burnsius philetas =

Species of skipper butterfly genus Pyrgus

Burnsius philetas, the desert checkered-skipper, formerly known as Pyrgus philetas, is a species of skipper butterfly in the family Hesperiidae. It is found from the southern United States (southern Arizona east to southern Texas, and to southern Mexico. Individuals are also found north to northern Arizona and northern Texas.

The wingspan is 25–29 mm. There are two to three generations, from February to December in Texas and from April to October in Arizona.

The larvae feed on several plants in the family Malvaceae, including Malvastrum and Sida. Adults feed on flower nectar.
