= Pseudodrephalys =

Scientific classification
- Kingdom: Animalia
- Phylum: Arthropoda
- Class: Insecta
- Order: Lepidoptera
- Family: Hesperiidae
- Tribe: Pyrgini
- Genus: Pseudodrephalys; Burns, 1998

Species
- See text

Genus of butterflies

Pseudodrephalys is a genus of South American skipper butterflies in the family Hesperiidae.

== Species ==
- Pseudodrephalys atinas Mabille, 1888
- Pseudodrephalys hypargus Mabille, 1891
- Pseudodrephalys sohni Burns, 1998
