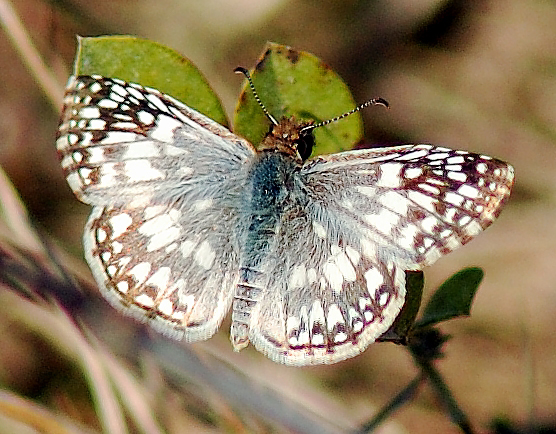
- Tropical checkered skipper, Pyrgus oileus

Scientific classification
- Kingdom: Animalia
- Phylum: Arthropoda
- Class: Insecta
- Order: Lepidoptera
- Family: Hesperiidae
- Subfamily: Pyrginae
- Tribe: Pyrgini; Burmeister, 1878

= Pyrgini =

Tribe of butterflies

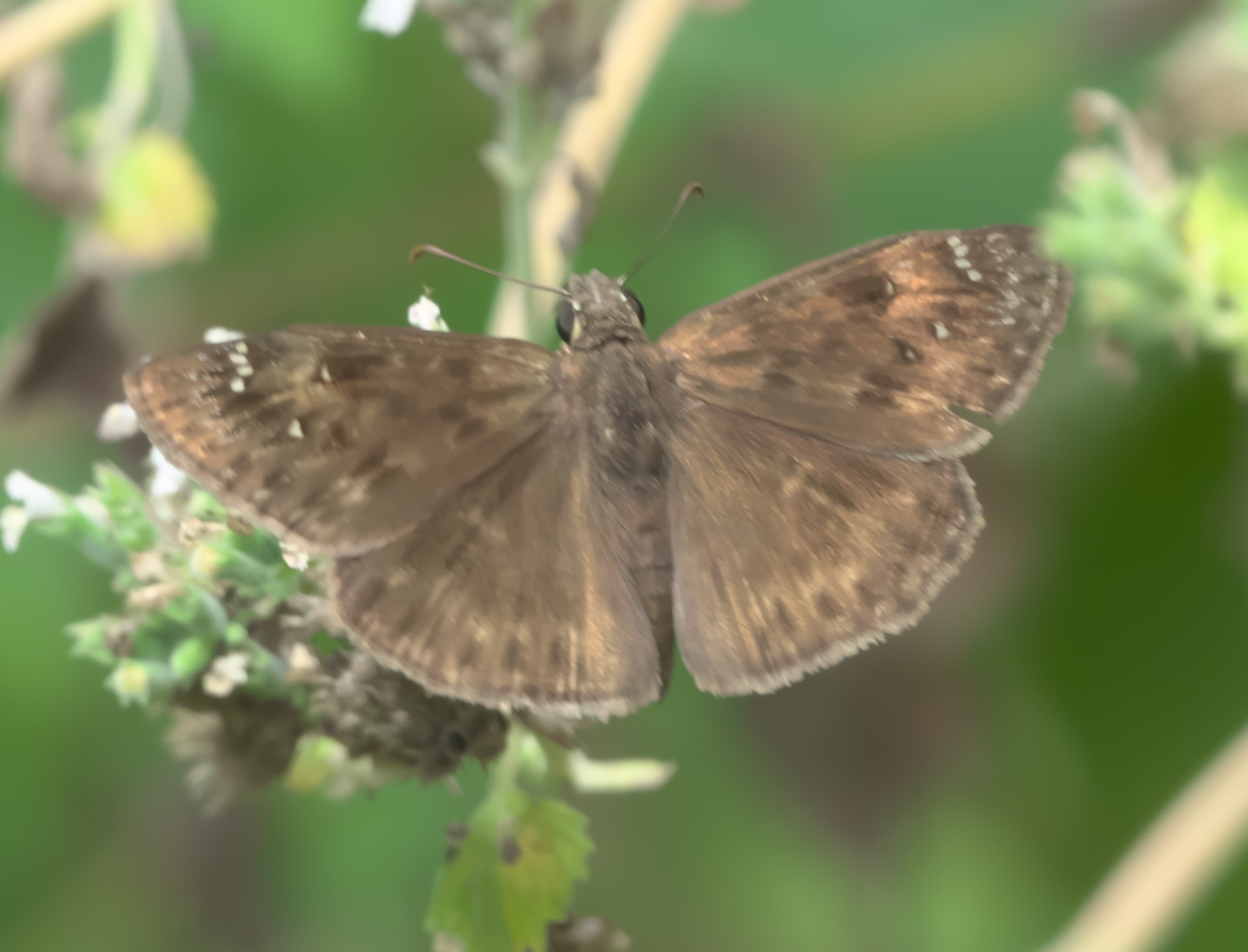
Celotes, streaky-skippers, Oklahoma

The Pyrgini are a tribe in the skipper butterfly subfamily Pyrginae. Formerly, when only four tribes of Pyrginae were recognized, the Pyrgini contained the largest number of genera among these. But this overly wide delimitation has since turned out to be paraphyletic.

One of the traditional Pyrginae tribes, the Eudamini, had to be raised to subfamily rank as Eudaminae. Some genera now in the Eudaminae were placed in the Pyrgini in earlier times. In addition, a number of additional tribes – Achlyodidini, Carcharodini and Erynnini – are now usually recognized again. These are close relatives of the Pyrgini sensu stricto, and may just as well be included in them as they used to be: together they do still form a monophyletic group. Most authors prefer to keep them separate however, as each is an apomorphic and biogeographically distinct lineage of the Pyrgini sensu lato. Of these newly recognized tribes, the Achlyodidini are closest to the Pyrgini, but conspicuously differ from the latter in their unusually-shaped wings.

== Genera ==
The genera of the Pyrgini, after genomic research published in 2019, are:

- Anisochoria Mabille, 1877
- Antigonus Hübner, 1819
- Bralus Grishin, 2019
- Burnsius Grishin, 2019 (New World checkered-skippers)
- Canesia Grishin, 2019
- Carrhenes Godman & Salvin, 1895
- Celotes Godman & Salvin, 1899 (streaky-skippers)
- Chirgus Grishin, 2019
- Clito Evans, 1953
- Diaeus Godman & Salvin, 1895
- Eracon Godman & Salvin, 1894
- Heliopetes Billberg, 1820 (white-skippers)
- Onenses Godman & Salvin, 1895
- Paches Godman & Salvin, 1895
- Plumbago Evans, 1953
- Pseudodrephalys Burns, 1998
- Pyrgus Hübner, 1819 (checkered-skippers)
- Santa Grishin, 2019
- Spioniades Hübner, 1819
- Systasea W. H. Edwards, 1877 (powdered-skippers)
- Trina Evans, 1953
- Xenophanes Godman & Salvin, 1895
- Zobera Freeman, 1970
- Zopyrion Godman & Salvin, 1896
