= Clito =

Clito could refer to:

- Clito (butterfly), a genus of spread-winged skipper butterflies
- Clito, a 2020 song by Madame
- William Clito (1102–1128), a member of the House of Normandy
- Slang for clitoris in French
