= Trina (disambiguation) =

Trina (born 1978) is an American rapper.

Trina may also refer to:

- Trina (butterfly)
- Trina (name)
- Trina (wrestler)
- Trina & Tamara American contemporary R&B group from Gary, Indiana who were active in the late 1990s
- Cyclone Trina

== See also ==
- Trina Solar, a Chinese manufacturer of photovoltaic modules
- Katrina (disambiguation)
