= Xenophanes (disambiguation) =

Xenophanes of Colophon (6th century BC) was a Greek philosopher.

Xenophanes may also refer to:

- Xenophanes (album), an album by Omar Rodríguez-López
- Xenophanes (butterfly), a genus of skipper butterfly
- Xenophanes (crater), a lunar crater
- 6026 Xenophanes, a main-belt asteroid
- Xenophanes, the main antagonist of the 2021 Friday Night Funkin' Mod Vs. Sonic.exe
