= Pseudodrephalys atinas =

Scientific classification
- Kingdom: Animalia
- Phylum: Arthropoda
- Clade: Pancrustacea
- Class: Insecta
- Order: Lepidoptera
- Family: Hesperiidae
- Genus: Pseudodrephalys
- Species: P. atinas

Binomial name
- Pseudodrephalys atinas Mabille, 1888

Species of butterfly

Pseudodrephalys atinas is a butterfly that is commonly found in south east Peru (Amazonian region). It belongs to the family Hesperiidae.
