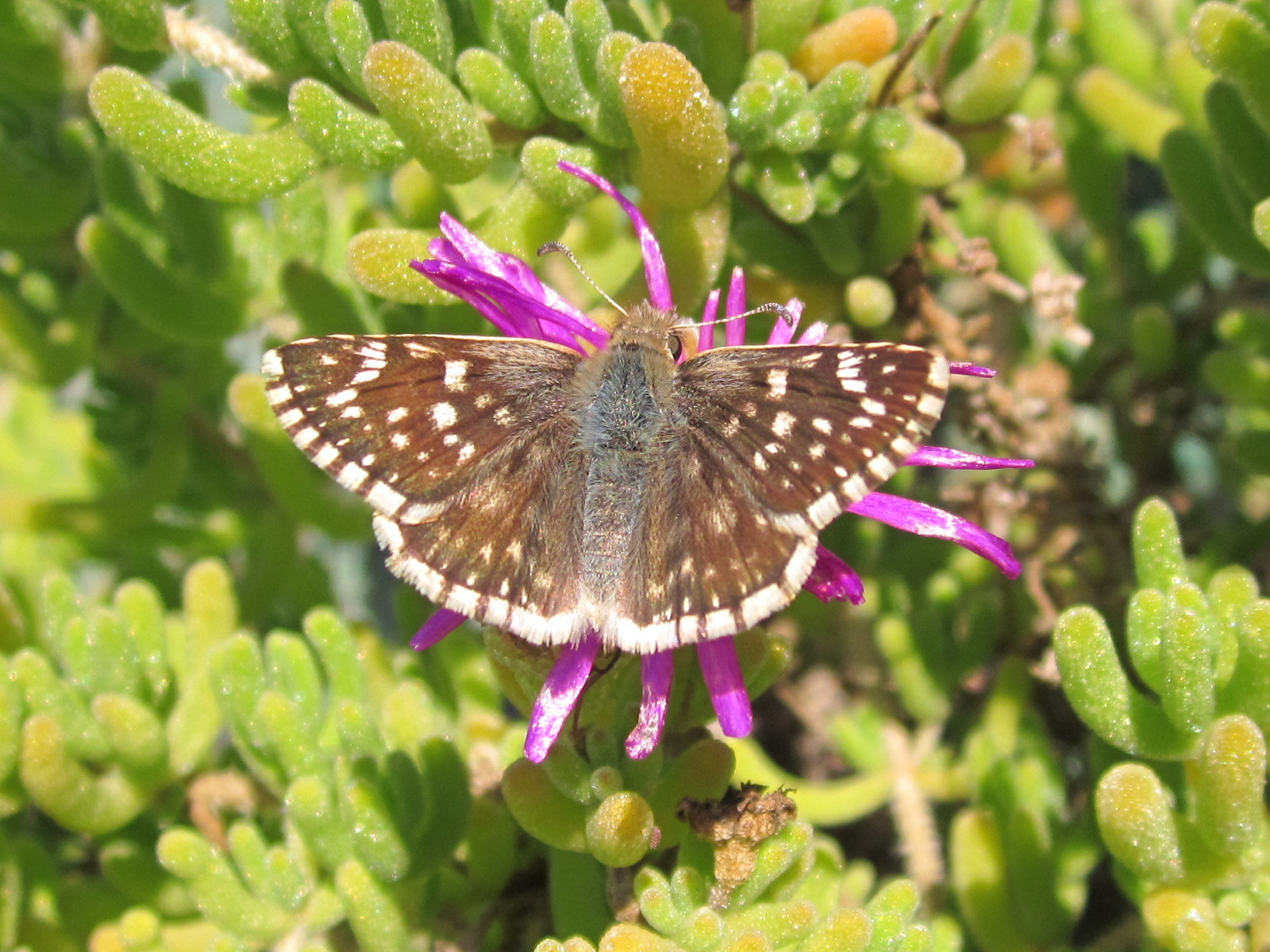
- Chirgus fides, Chile

Scientific classification
- Kingdom: Animalia
- Phylum: Arthropoda
- Clade: Pancrustacea
- Class: Insecta
- Order: Lepidoptera
- Family: Hesperiidae
- Subfamily: Pyrginae
- Tribe: Pyrgini
- Genus: Chirgus; Grishin, 2019

= Chirgus =

Genus of butterflies

Chirgus is a genus of checkered-skippers, white-skippers, and allies in the butterfly family Hesperiidae, found in the New World. The genus was erected by Nick Grishin in 2019. There are about six described species in Chirgus.

As a result of a 2019 study of the genomes of 250 representative species of skippers, the genera Chirgus was created to contain six related species formerly in the genus Pyrgus.

== Species ==
These six species belong to the genus Chirgus:

- Chirgus barrosi (Ureta, 1956)
- Chirgus bocchoris (Hewitson, 1874)
- Chirgus fides (Hayward, 1940)
- Chirgus limbata (Erschoff, 1876)
- Chirgus nigella (Weeks, 1902)
- Chirgus veturius (Plötz, 1884)
