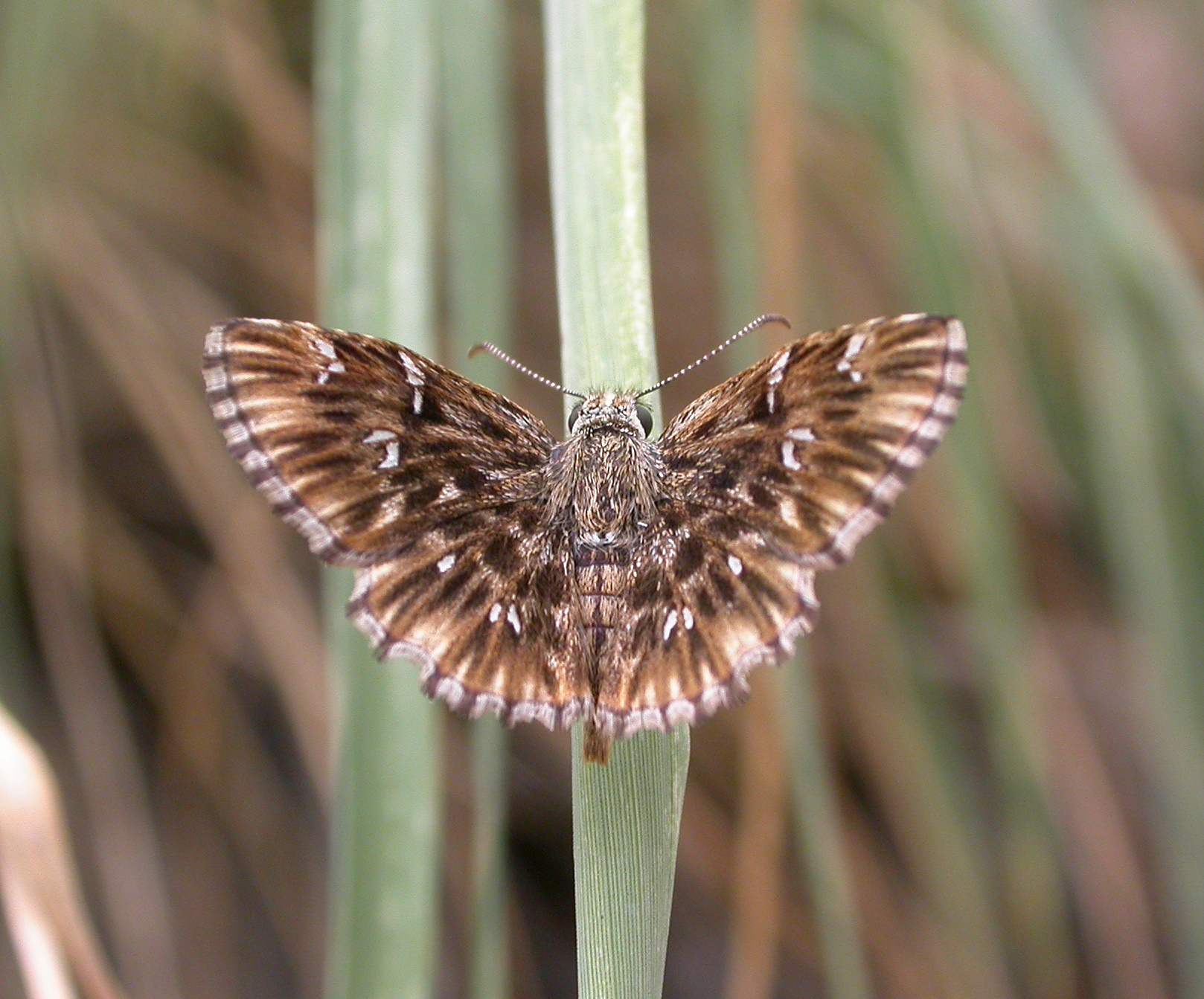

Scientific classification
- Domain: Eukaryota
- Kingdom: Animalia
- Phylum: Arthropoda
- Class: Insecta
- Order: Lepidoptera
- Family: Hesperiidae
- Genus: Celotes
- Species: C. nessus

Binomial name
- Celotes nessus (Edwards, 1877)

Synonyms
- Pholisora nessus Edwards, 1877; Spilothyrus notabilis Strecker, 1878; Carcharodus radiatus Plötz, 1884; Hesperia nessus (Edwards, 1877)

= Celotes nessus =

Common streaky-skipper

Species of butterfly

Celotes nessus, the common streaky-skipper, is a butterfly of the family Hesperiidae. It is found in North America from southern Arizona, southern New Mexico, and western Texas south to northern Mexico. Rare strays can be found up to southern Oklahoma and northern Louisiana.

The wingspan is 22–30 mm. There are several generations with adults on wing from March to September in Texas.

The larvae feed on several mallow species, including Sphaeralcea and Sida filipes. Adults feed on flower nectar.
