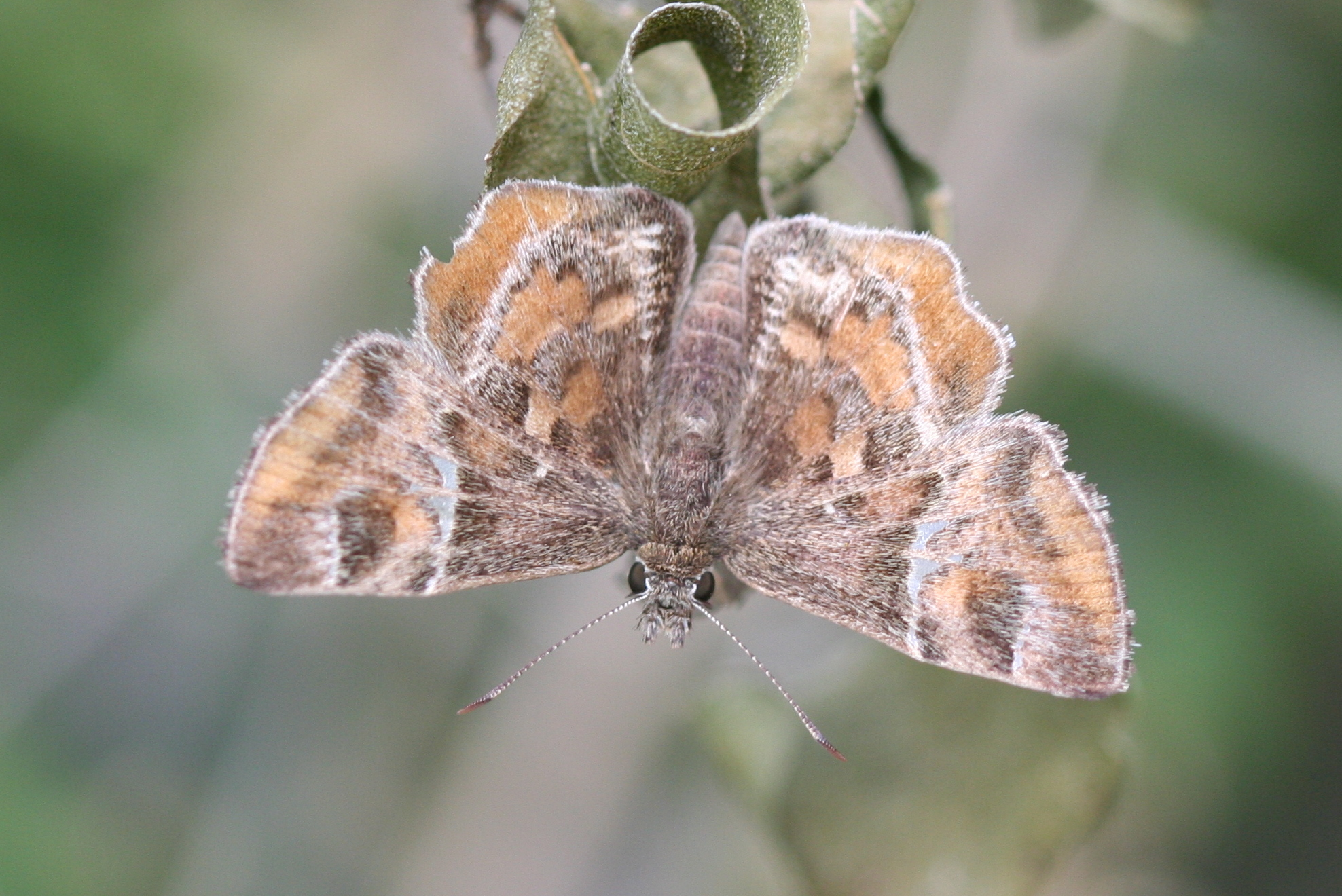
- Texas Powdered Skipper (Systasea pulverulenta)

Scientific classification
- Kingdom: Animalia
- Phylum: Arthropoda
- Class: Insecta
- Order: Lepidoptera
- Family: Hesperiidae
- Tribe: Pyrgini
- Genus: Systasea; Edwards, 1877

= Systasea =

Genus of butterflies

Systasea is a genus of skipper butterflies in the family Hesperiidae.

The name Systasea was introduced as a replacement for the name Lintneria, which is invalid under the Law of Homonymy.

== Species ==
- Systasea microsticta Dyar, 1923
- Systasea pulverulenta (R. Felder, 1869)
- Systasea zampa (Edwards, 1876)

== Identify ==
- Outer margin of hindwing has two deep indentations.
- Upperside is orange brown with darker olive-brown areas.
- Forewing has a median band of transparent spots all in a row.
- Wingspan: 15/16-1 3/8 inches (2.4-3.5 cm).
