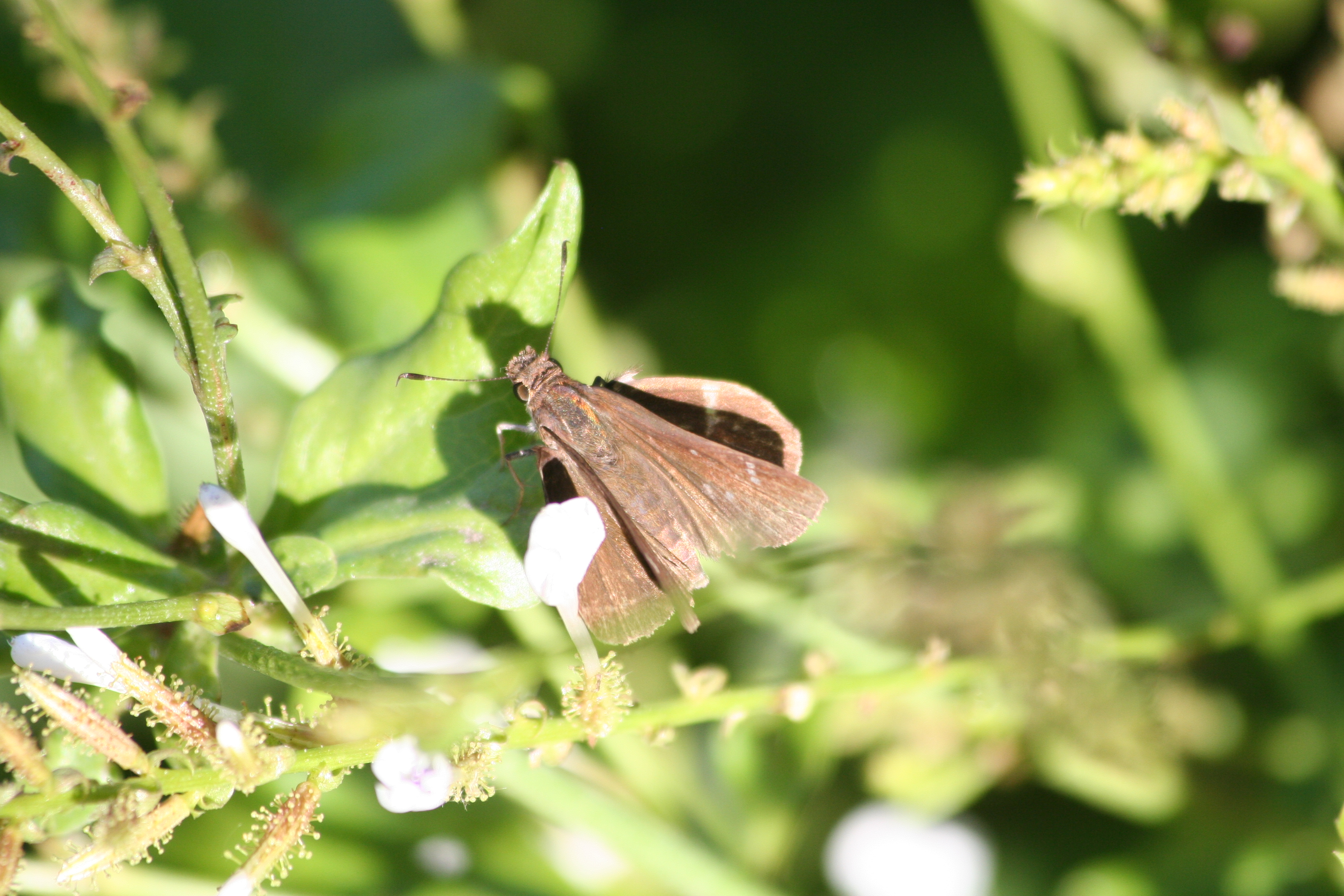

Scientific classification
- Kingdom: Animalia
- Phylum: Arthropoda
- Class: Insecta
- Order: Lepidoptera
- Family: Hesperiidae
- Genus: Quasimellana
- Species: Q. eulogius

Binomial name
- Quasimellana eulogius (Plötz, 1882)

Synonyms
- Atrytone heberia Dyar, 1914; Atrytone mellona Godman, 1900

= Quasimellana eulogius =

Species of butterfly

Quasimellana eulogius, the common mellana, is a species of grass skipper in the butterfly family Hesperiidae.

The MONA or Hodges number for Quasimellana eulogius is 4068.
