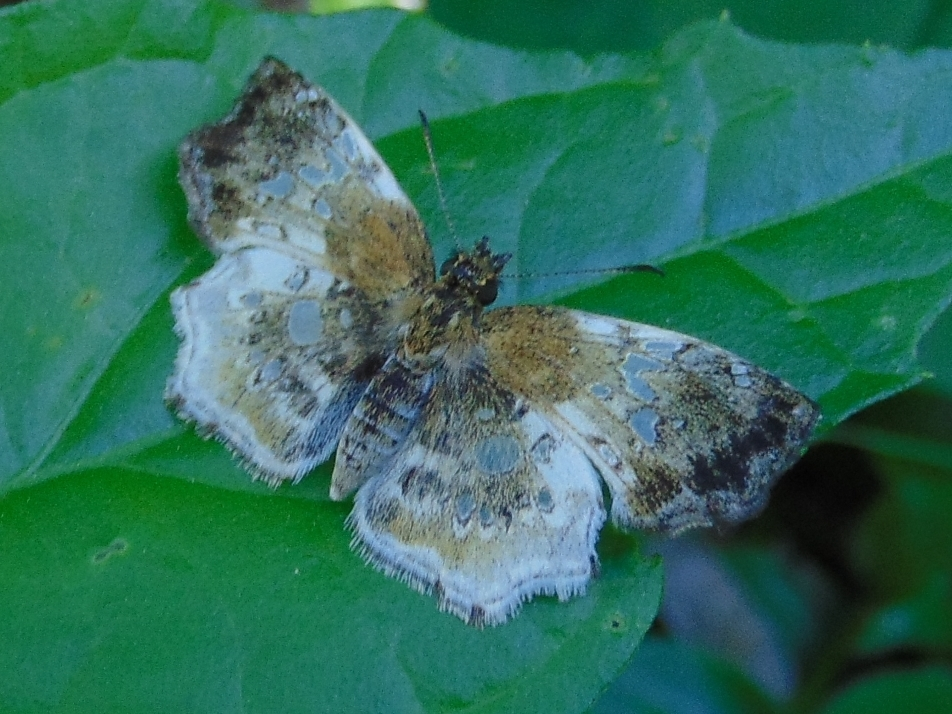
- Diaeus lacaena

Scientific classification
- Kingdom: Animalia
- Phylum: Arthropoda
- Clade: Pancrustacea
- Class: Insecta
- Order: Lepidoptera
- Family: Hesperiidae
- Tribe: Pyrgini
- Genus: Diaeus; Godman & Salvin, [1895]

= Diaeus (butterfly) =

Genus of butterflies

Diaeus is a genus of skipper butterflies in the family Hesperiidae. The genus was erected by Frederick DuCane Godman and Osbert Salvin in 1895.

== Species ==
The following species are recognised in the genus Diaeus:

- Diaeus ambata Evans, 1953 - Ecuador
- Diaeus lacaena (Hewitson, 1869) - Costa Rica, Panama, Brazil
- Diaeus variegata (Plötz, 1884) - Brazil (Rio de Janeiro), Bolivia
- Diaeus varna Evans, 1953 - Mexico
