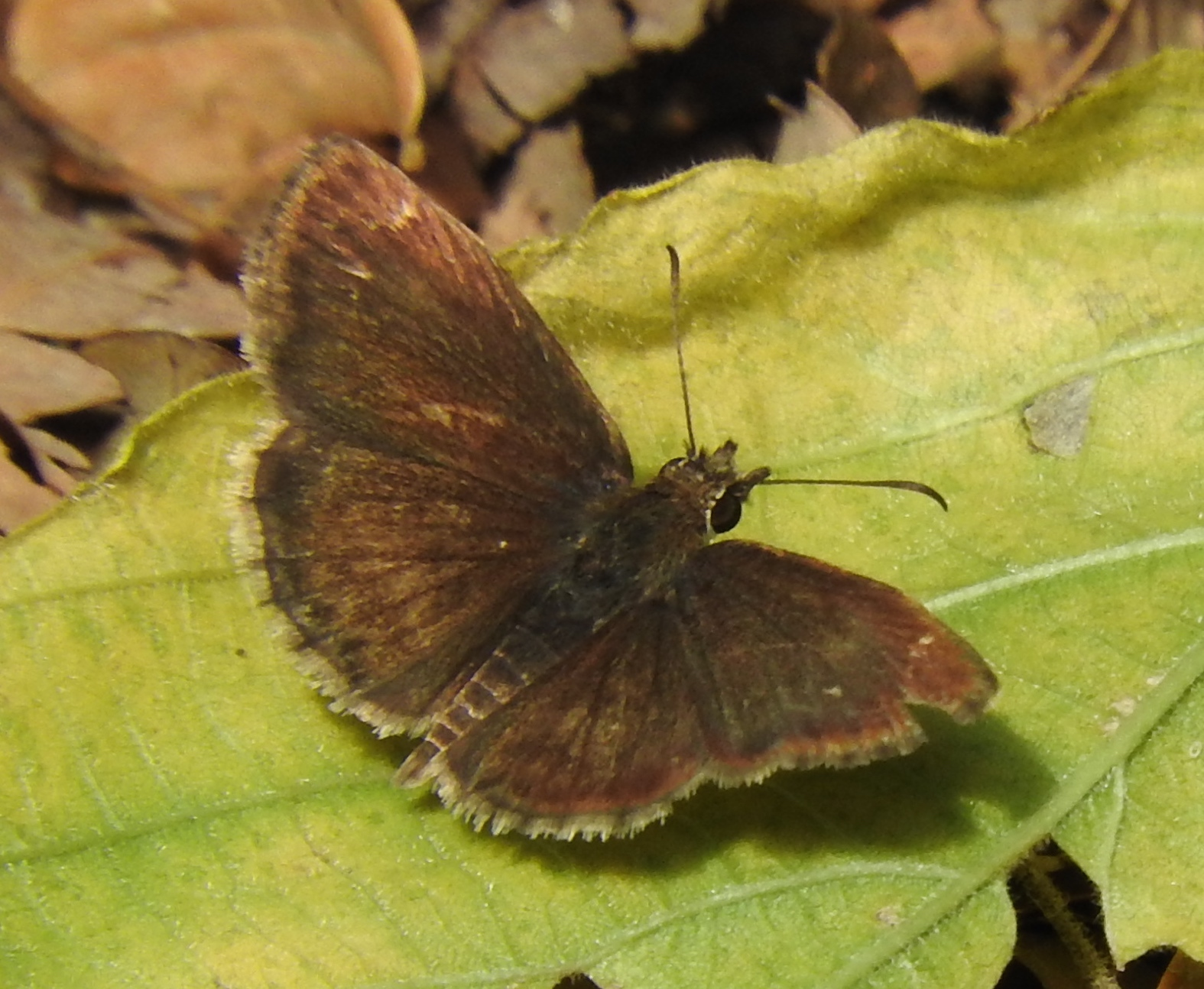
- Zopyrion sandace

Scientific classification
- Kingdom: Animalia
- Phylum: Arthropoda
- Class: Insecta
- Order: Lepidoptera
- Family: Hesperiidae
- Tribe: Pyrgini
- Genus: Zopyrion; Godman & Salvin, [1896]

= Zopyrion (skipper) =

Genus of butterflies

Zopyrion is a genus of butterflies in the Hesperiidae (skipper) family and the Pyrgini tribe. The type species, Zopyrion sandace, was described in 1896 by Frederick DuCane Godman and Osbert Salvin in their Biologia Centrali-Americana.

== Species ==
- Zopyrion evenor Godman, [1901]
- Zopyrion reticulata Hayward, 1942
- Zopyrion sandace Godman & Salvin, [1896]
- Zopyrion satyrina (C. & R. Felder, 1867)
- Zopyrion subvariegata Hayward, 1942
