= Pseudodrephalys sohni =

Scientific classification
- Domain: Eukaryota
- Kingdom: Animalia
- Phylum: Arthropoda
- Class: Insecta
- Order: Lepidoptera
- Family: Hesperiidae
- Genus: Pseudodrephalys
- Species: P. sohni

Binomial name
- Pseudodrephalys sohni Burns, 1998

Species of butterfly

Pseudodrephalys sohni is commonly found in Amazonas, Brazil.
