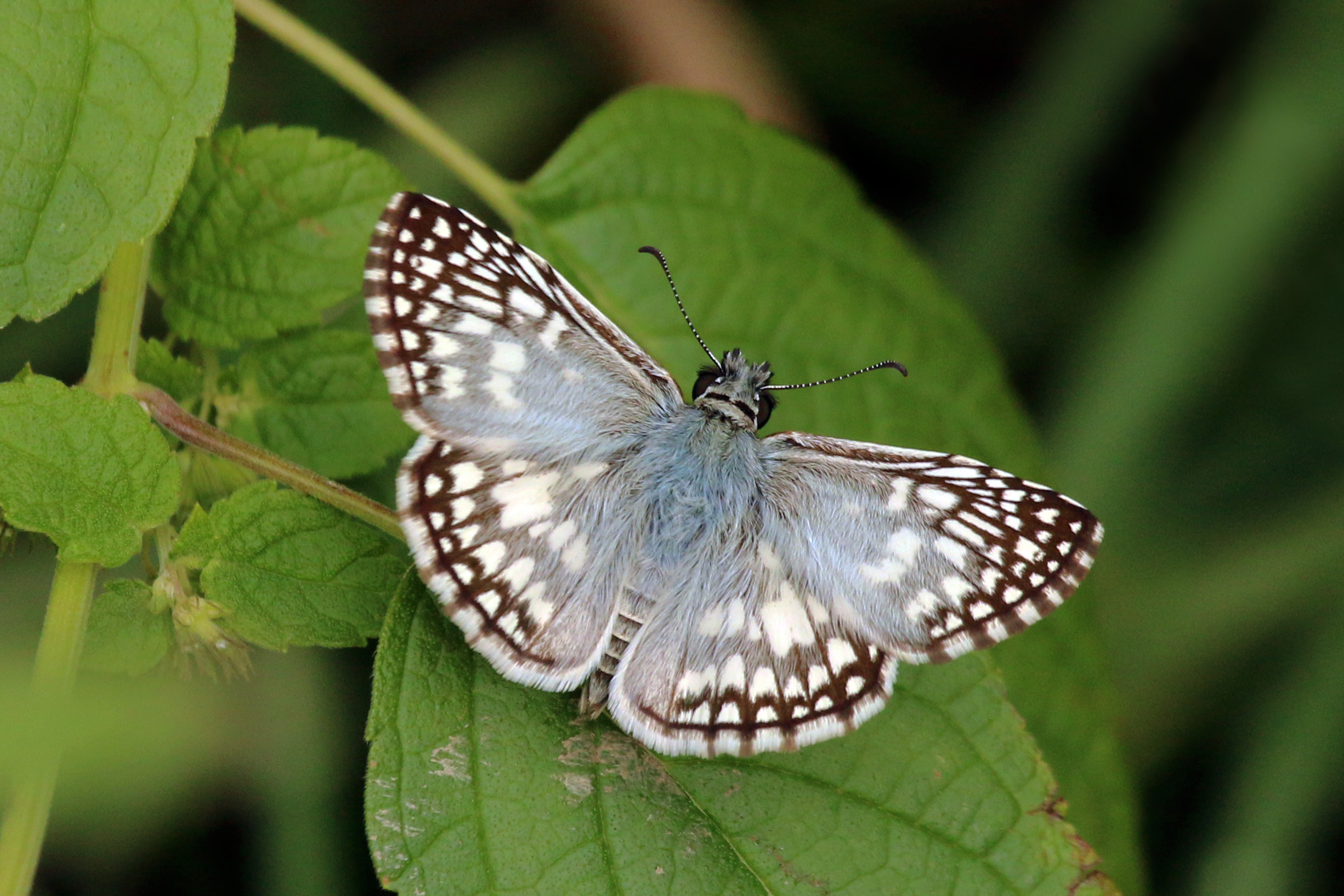
- male B. orcus, Tobago
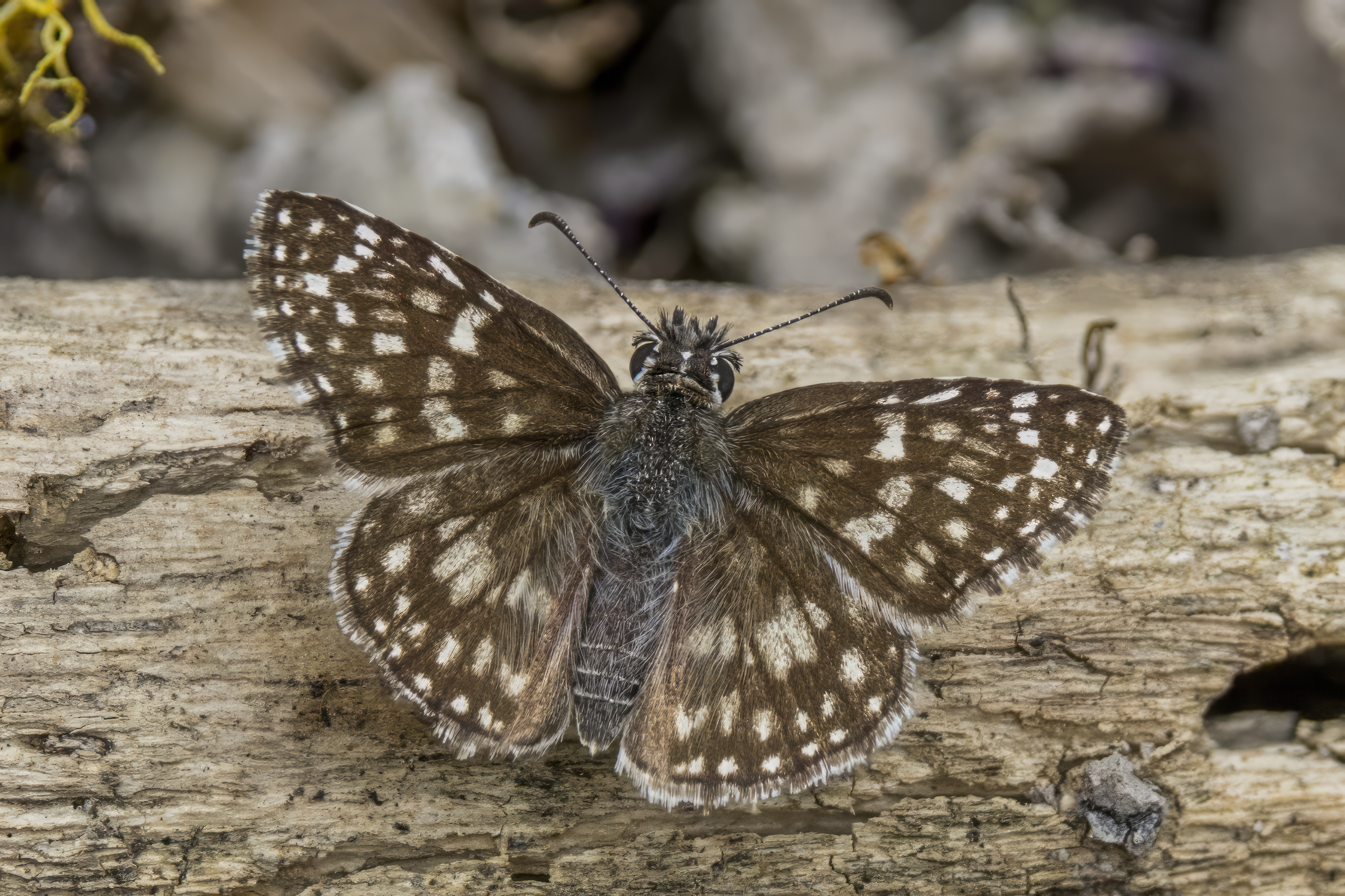
- female B. orcus, Colombia

Scientific classification
- Kingdom: Animalia
- Phylum: Arthropoda
- Class: Insecta
- Order: Lepidoptera
- Family: Hesperiidae
- Subfamily: Pyrginae
- Tribe: Pyrgini
- Genus: Burnsius; Grishin, 2019

= Burnsius =

Genus of butterflies

Burnsius is a genus of New World checkered-skippers in the butterfly family Hesperiidae. The genus was erected by Nick V. Grishin in 2019.

As a result of a 2019 study of the genomes of 250 representative species of skippers, the genus Burnsius was created to contain 12 related species formerly in the genus Pyrgus. As of 2022, there were 14 species in Burnsius.

== Species ==
These 14 species belong to the genus Burnsius:

- Burnsius adepta (Plötz, 1884) (Colombian checkered-skipper)
- Burnsius albezens Grishin, 2022 (White checkered-skipper)
- Burnsius brenda (Evans, 1942) (Brenda checkered-skipper)
- Burnsius burnsi Grishin, 2022 (Burns' checkered-skipper)
- Burnsius chloe (Evans, 1942) (Chloe checkered-skipper)
- Burnsius communis (Grote, 1872) (common checkered skipper)
- Burnsius crisia (Herrich-Schäffer, 1865) (Antillean checkered-skipper)
- Burnsius notatus (Blanchard, 1852)
- Burnsius oileus (Linnaeus, 1767) (tropical checkered skipper)
- Burnsius orcus (Stoll, 1780) (orcus checkered-skipper)
- Burnsius orcynoides (Giacomelli, 1928)
- Burnsius orcynus Grishin, 2022
- Burnsius philetas (Edwards, 1881) (desert checkered-skipper)
- Burnsius titicaca (Reverdin, 1921) (Peruvian checkered-skipper)
