= Plumbago (butterfly) =

Scientific classification
- Kingdom: Animalia
- Phylum: Arthropoda
- Clade: Pancrustacea
- Class: Insecta
- Order: Lepidoptera
- Family: Hesperiidae
- Subfamily: Pyrginae
- Tribe: Pyrgini
- Genus: Plumbago; Evans, 1953

Genus of butterflies

Plumbago is a genus of skippers in the family Hesperiidae.
