= Chirgus barrosi =

Scientific classification
- Kingdom: Animalia
- Phylum: Arthropoda
- Class: Insecta
- Order: Lepidoptera
- Family: Hesperiidae
- Genus: Chirgus
- Species: C. barrosi

Binomial name
- Chirgus barrosi (Ureta, 1956)

Synonyms
- Pyrgus barrosi Ureta, 1956

Species of skipper butterfly

Chirgus barrosi is a species of butterfly of the family of Hesperiidae, first described in 1956 by Emilio Ureta. It is known from Chile, where it is found at high altitudes in sandy locations with leguminous plants.

The species was previously placed in genus Pyrgus, but was, alongside several other species formerly in Pyrgus, transferred to newly-erected genus Chirgus in 2019.
