= Eracon =

Scientific classification
- Kingdom: Animalia
- Phylum: Arthropoda
- Class: Insecta
- Order: Lepidoptera
- Family: Hesperiidae
- Tribe: Pyrgini
- Genus: Eracon; Godman & Salvin, [1894]

Genus of butterflies

Eracon is a genus of skipper butterflies in the family Hesperiidae.

== Species ==
Recognised species in the genus Eracon include:

- Eracon sarahburnsae Grishin, 2014
