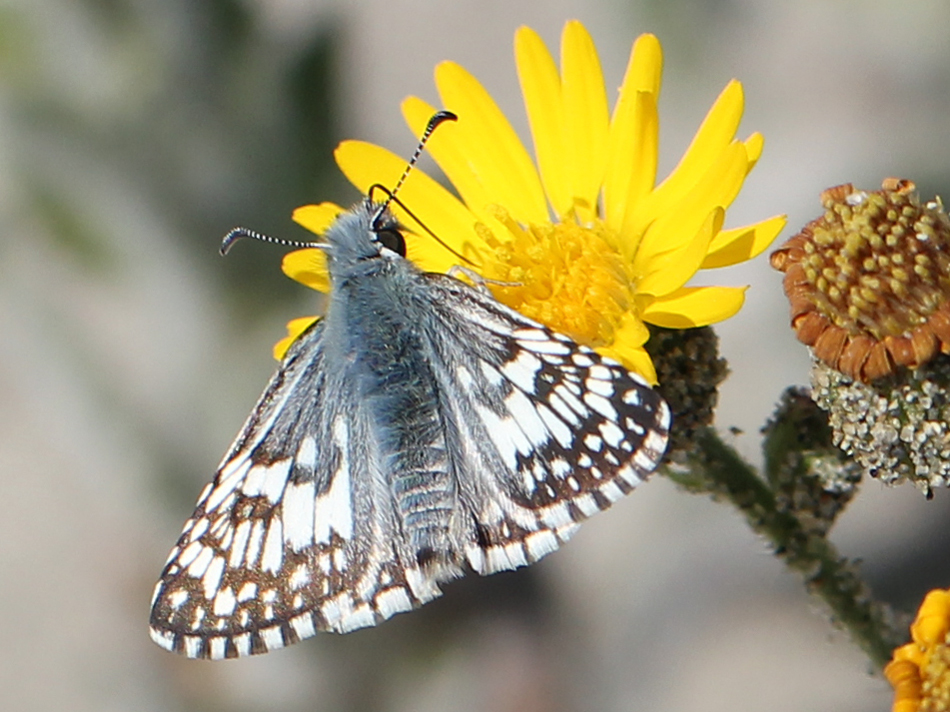

Conservation status
- Secure (NatureServe)

Scientific classification
- Kingdom: Animalia
- Phylum: Arthropoda
- Clade: Pancrustacea
- Class: Insecta
- Order: Lepidoptera
- Family: Hesperiidae
- Genus: Burnsius
- Species: B. communis

Binomial name
- Burnsius communis (Grote, 1872)
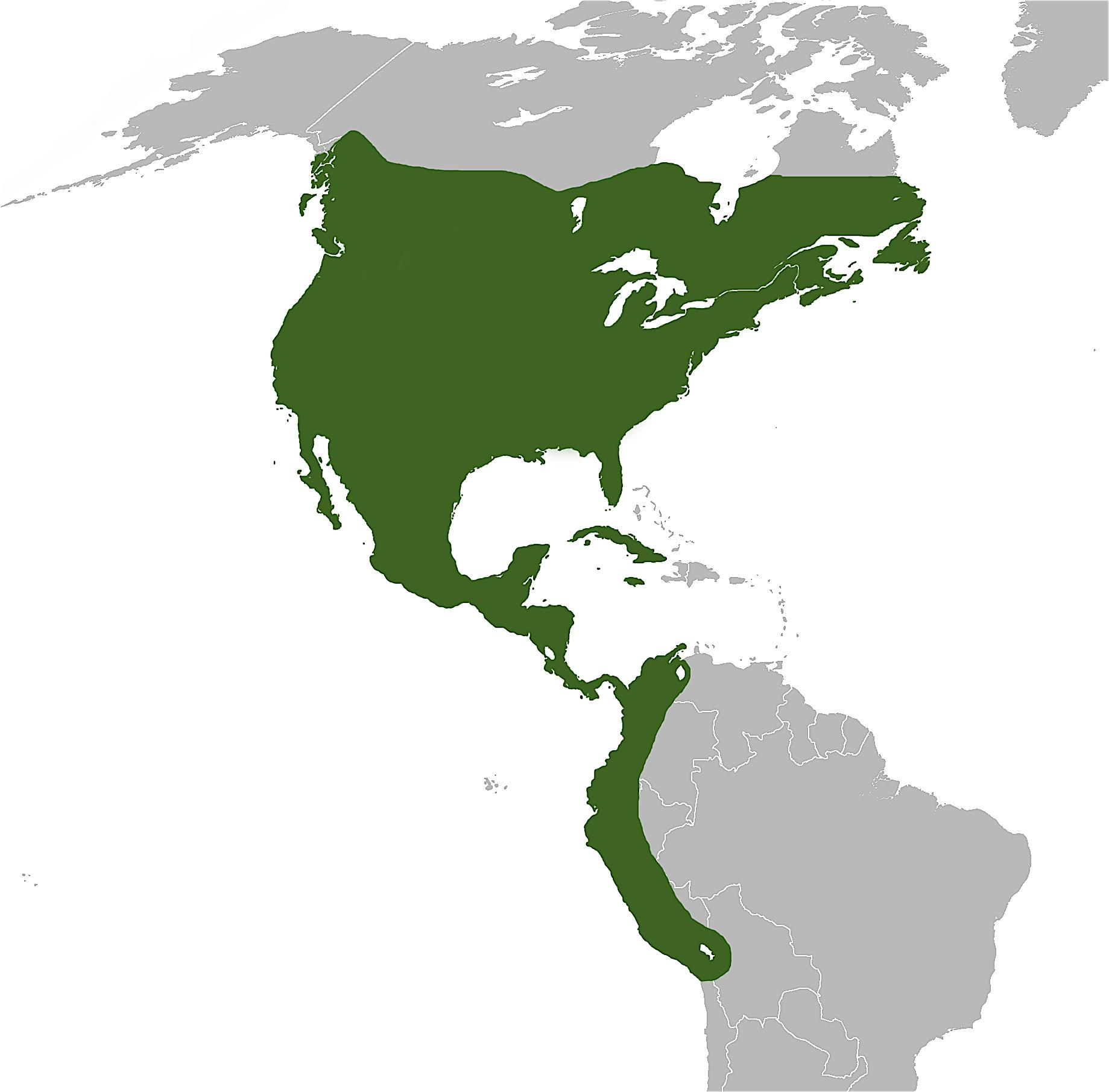

Synonyms
- Pyrgus communis Grote, 1872

= Burnsius communis =

Common checkered-skipper

Species of skipper butterfly genus Pyrgus

Burnsius communis, the common checkered-skipper, formerly known as Pyrgus communis, is a species of butterfly in the family Hesperiidae. It is known as the frequently seen Pyrginae species in the northern United States by collectors and watchers alike.

== Description ==
The common checkered-skipper has a wingspan of 19 to 32 mm. It gets its name from the checkerboard pattern on its wings; the male tends to have broader bands than the female. The body tends to be blue-gray with the small amount of "fuzz" which is seen in all skippers.

== Distribution ==
This butterfly flies in gardens, parks, fields, roadsides, riverbanks, lowlands and foothills throughout southern Canada and almost the entire expanse of the United States. It has also been seen in Mexico.

== Life cycle ==
The eggs are small and round, about 0.5 mm in diameter, and are a pale-green color. They are usually laid singly on tender parts of their host plant. The caterpillar has a black head and greenish-tan body. It has a dark line along its back and tends to be paler on the sides.

In southern regions this species will fly all year with multiple broods. In the north it will have two broods and fly late into the fall.

=== Larval foods ===
- Various species in the Mallow family

== Gallery ==
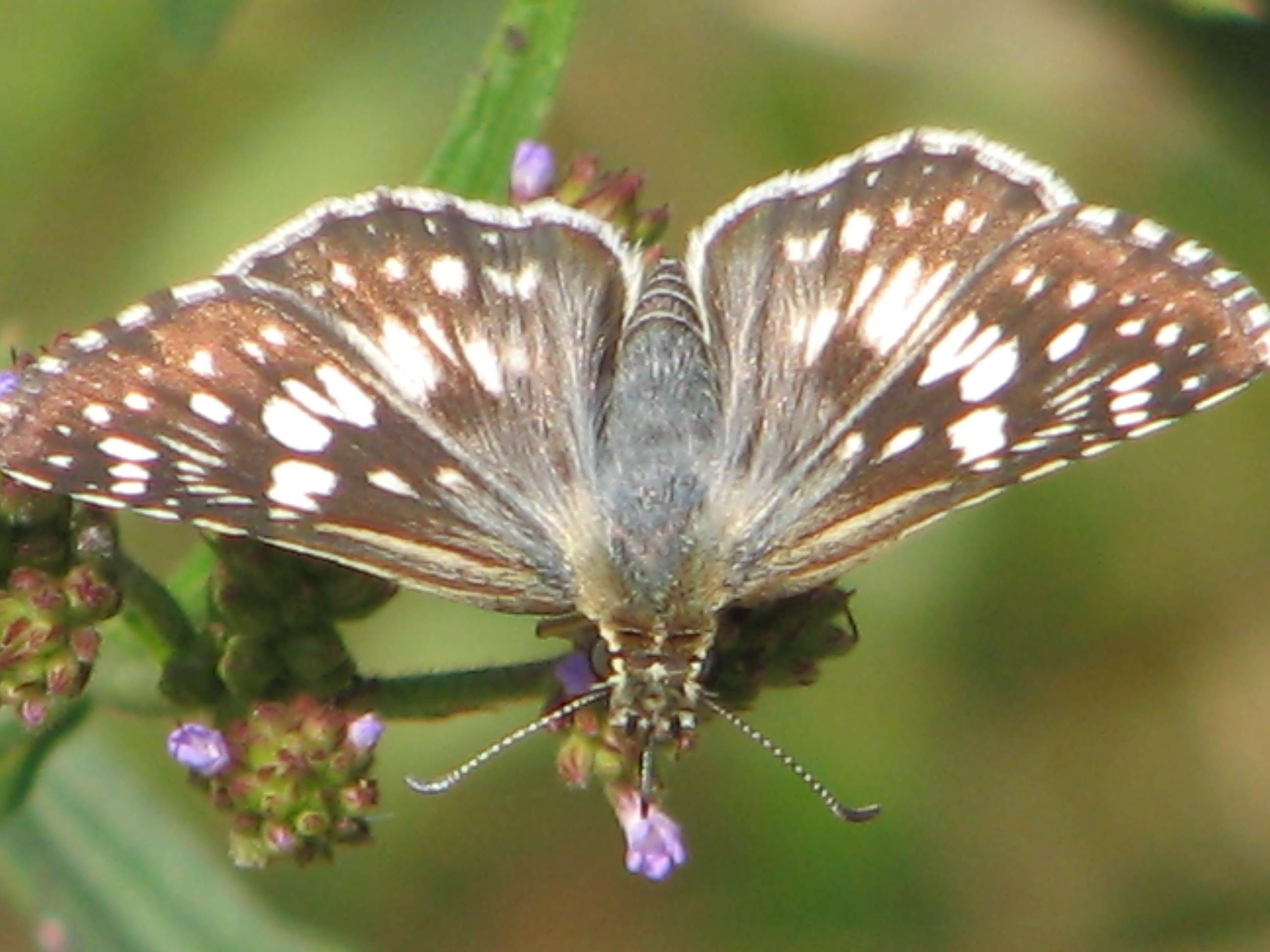
Female

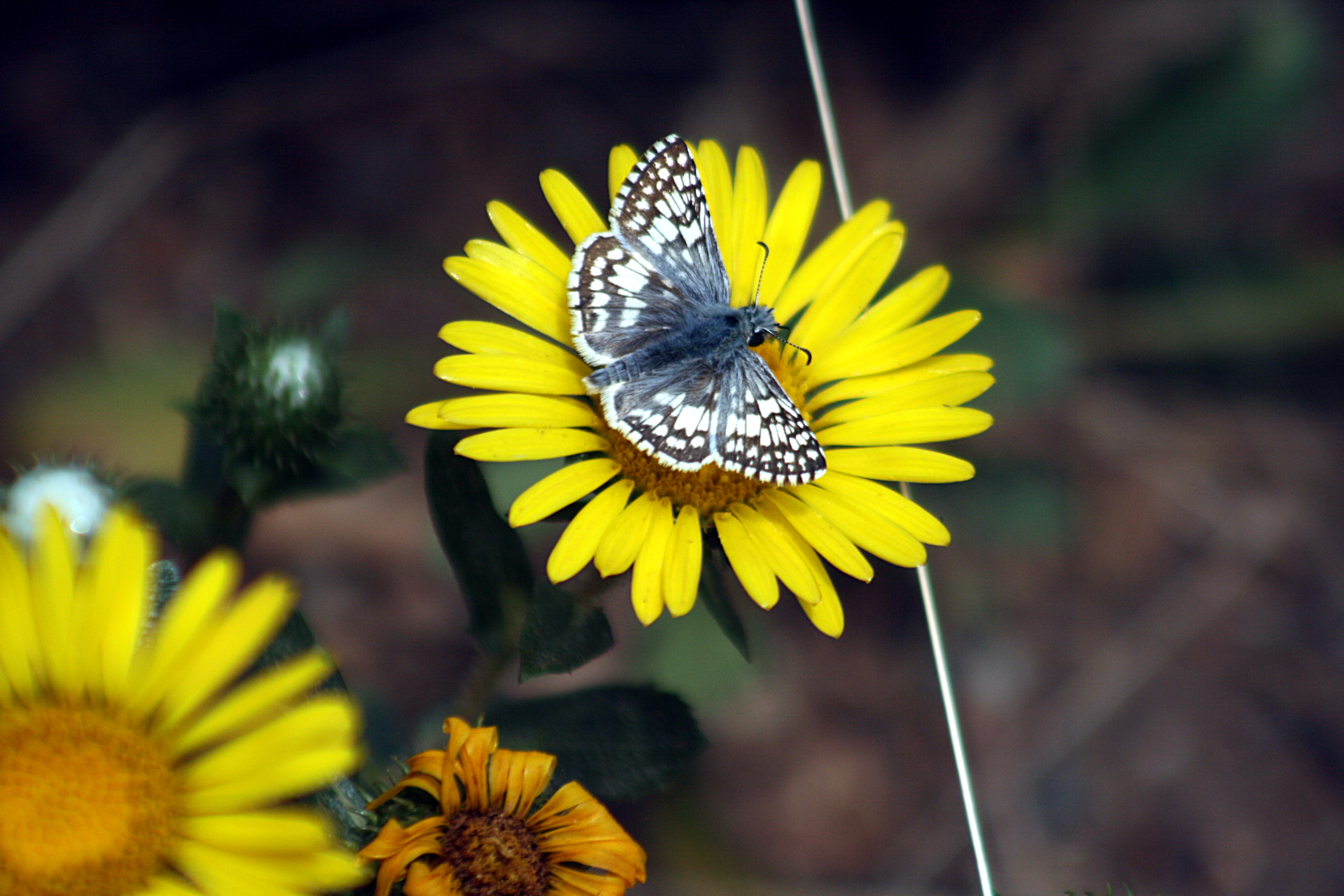
Male

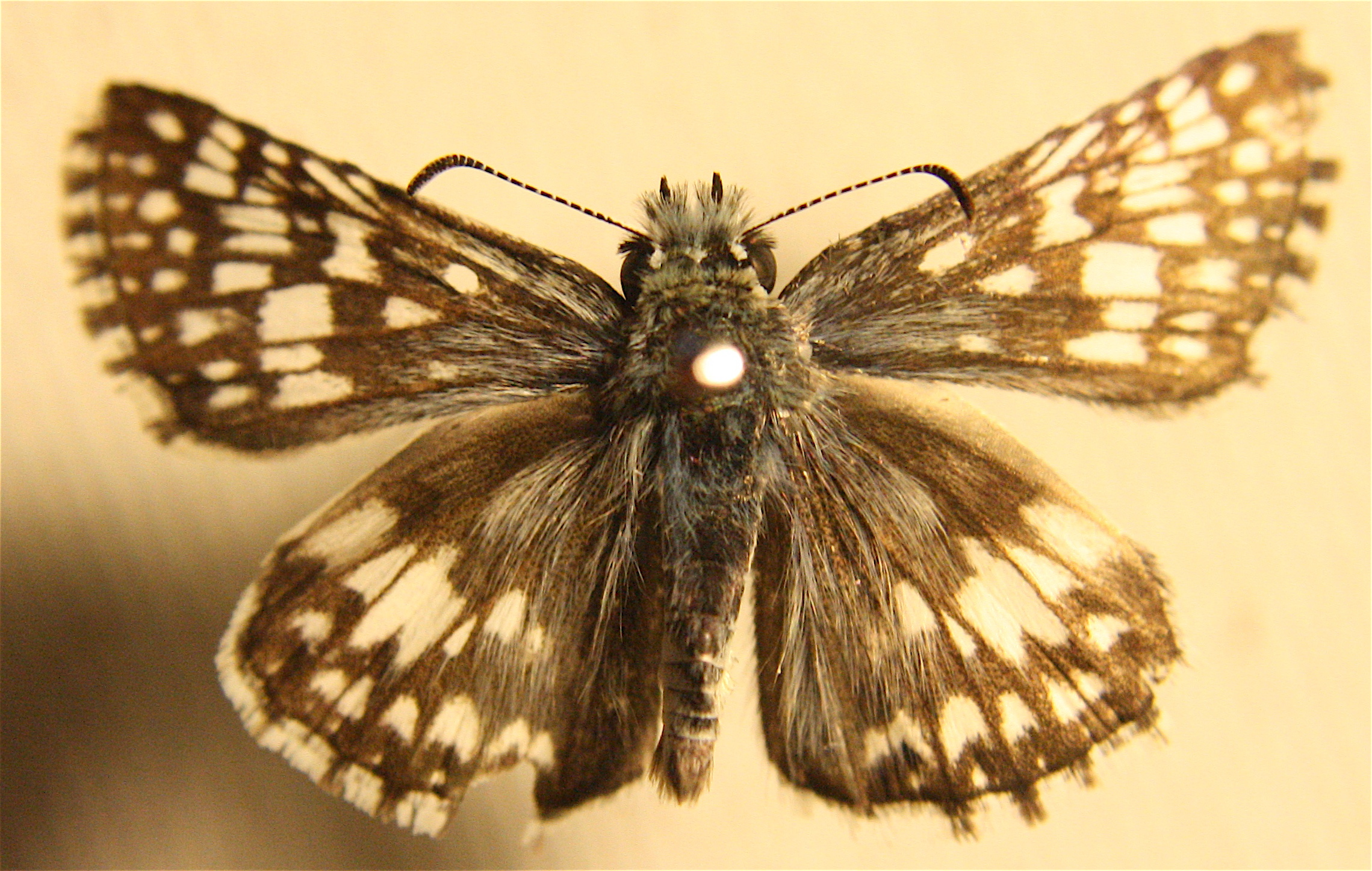
Pinned male
