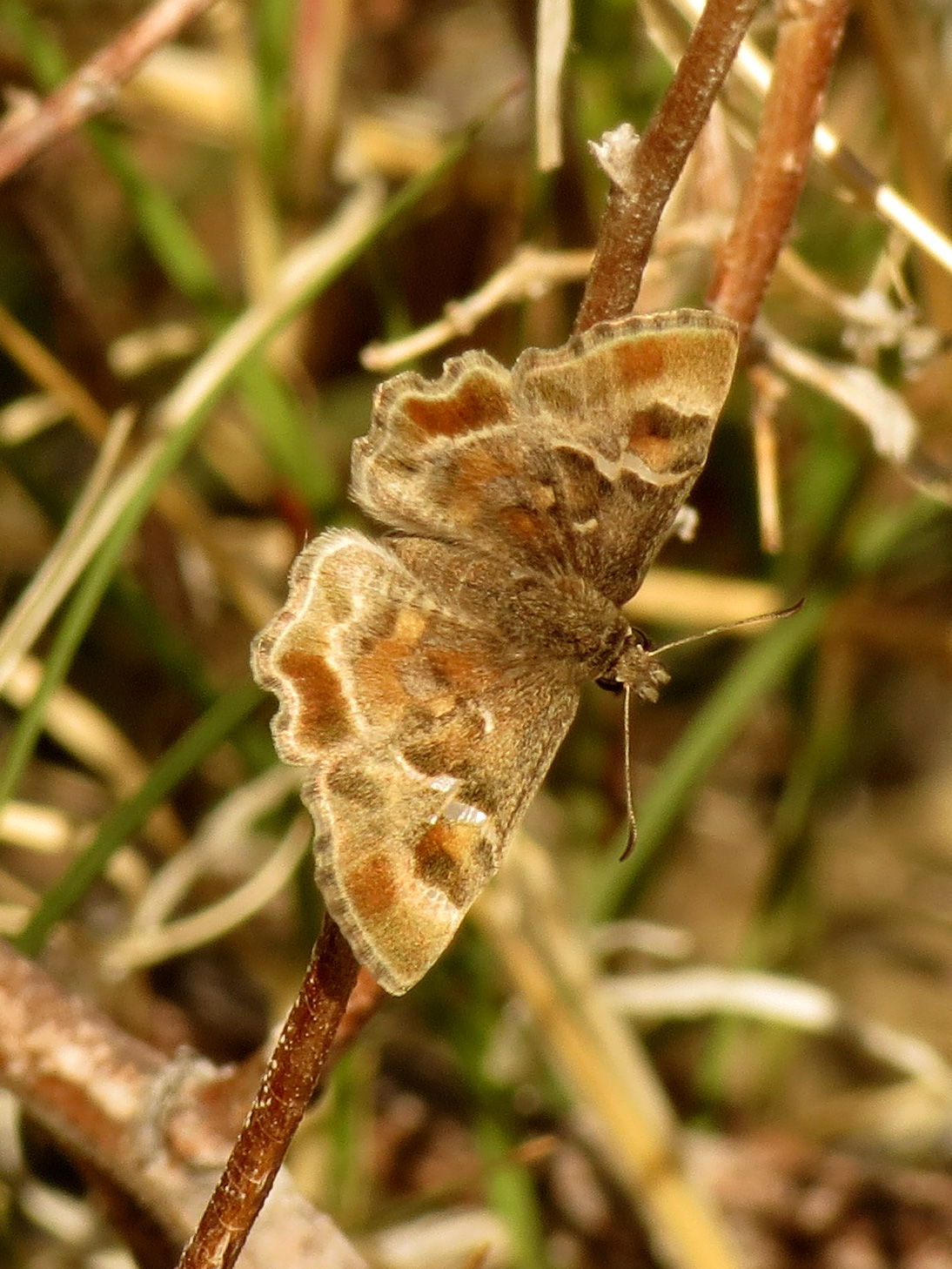

Scientific classification
- Kingdom: Animalia
- Phylum: Arthropoda
- Clade: Pancrustacea
- Class: Insecta
- Order: Lepidoptera
- Family: Hesperiidae
- Genus: Systasea
- Species: S. zampa

Binomial name
- Systasea zampa (W. H. Edwards, 1876)

Synonyms
- Antigonus evansi E. Bell, 1941

= Systasea zampa =

Species of butterfly

Systasea zampa, the Arizona powdered-skipper, is a species of spread-wing skipper in the butterfly family Hesperiidae. It is found in Central America and North America.
