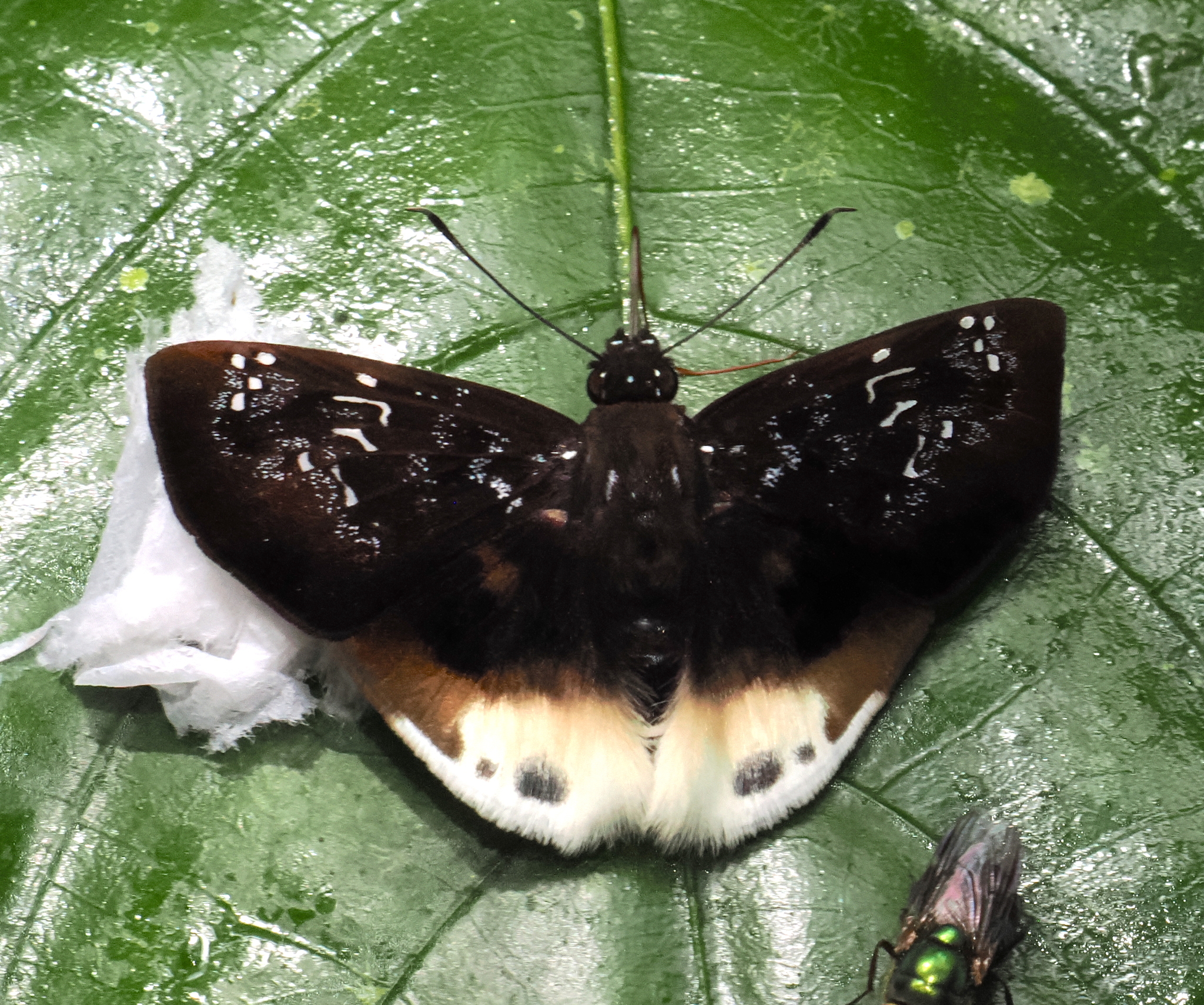
- Spioniades abbreviata

Scientific classification
- Kingdom: Animalia
- Phylum: Arthropoda
- Class: Insecta
- Order: Lepidoptera
- Family: Hesperiidae
- Tribe: Pyrgini
- Genus: Spioniades; Hübner, [1819]

= Spioniades =

Genus of butterflies

Spioniades is a genus of skippers in the family Hesperiidae.
