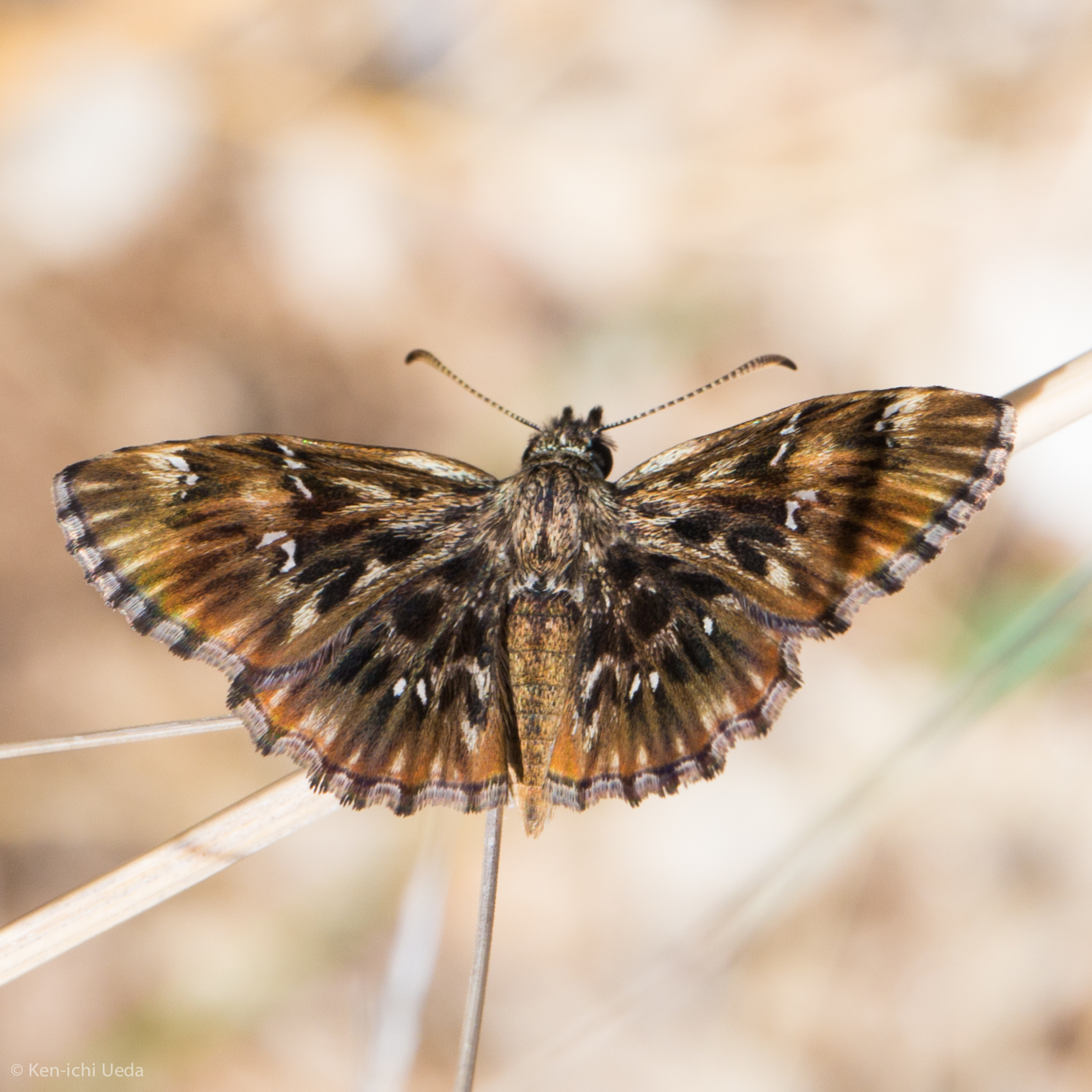

Scientific classification
- Kingdom: Animalia
- Phylum: Arthropoda
- Class: Insecta
- Order: Lepidoptera
- Family: Hesperiidae
- Tribe: Pyrgini
- Genus: Celotes; Godman & Salvin, [1899]

= Celotes =

Genus of butterflies

Celotes is a genus of skippers in the family Hesperiidae.

== Species ==
- Celotes limpia Burns, 1974
- Celotes nessus (Edwards, 1877)
- Celotes spurcus A.D.Warren, Steinhauser, Hernández-Mejía & Grishin, 2008
