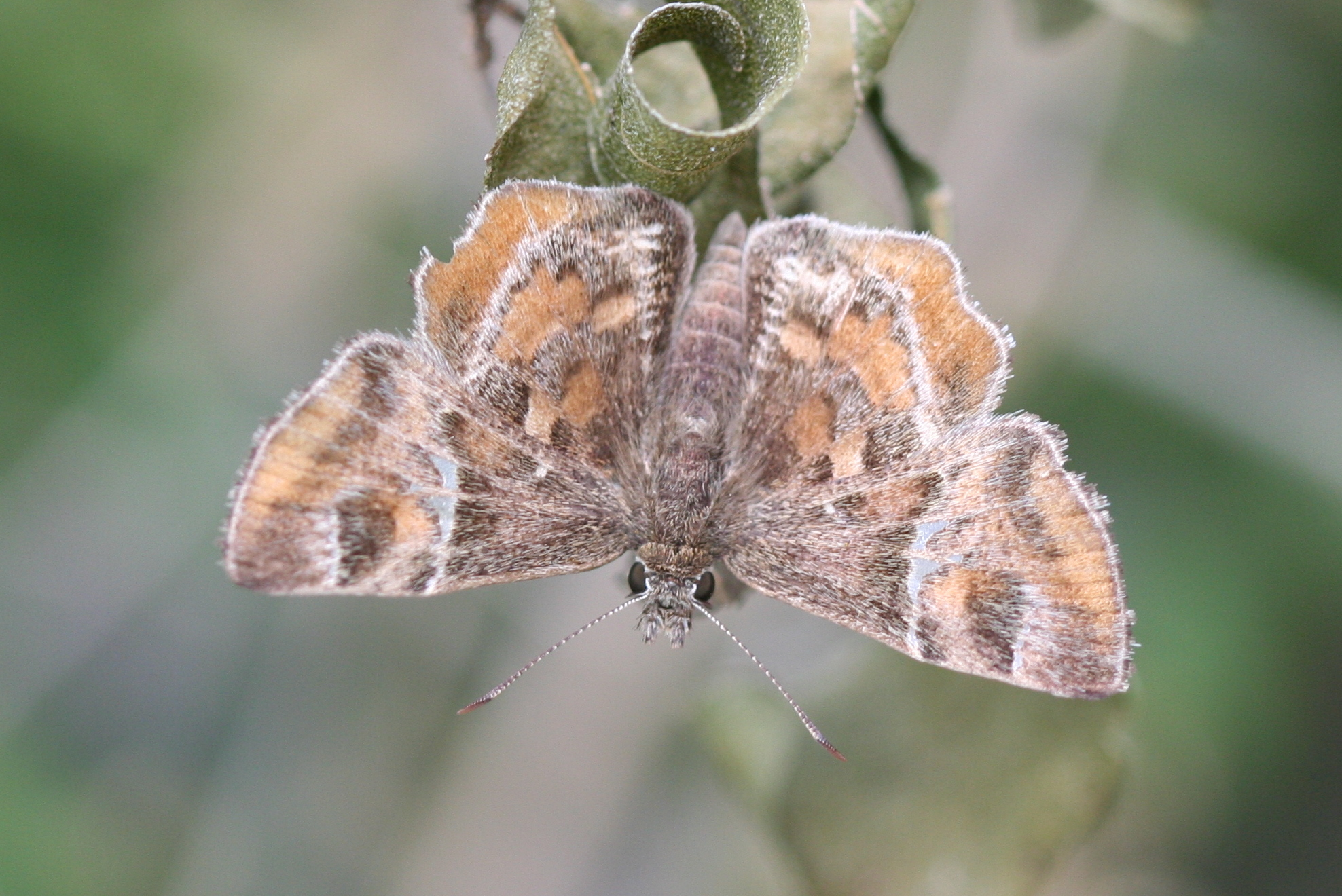

Scientific classification
- Domain: Eukaryota
- Kingdom: Animalia
- Phylum: Arthropoda
- Class: Insecta
- Order: Lepidoptera
- Family: Hesperiidae
- Genus: Systasea
- Species: S. pulverulenta

Binomial name
- Systasea pulverulenta (R. Felder, 1869)

Synonyms
- Leucochitonea pulverulenta R. Felder, 1869; Tagiades taeniatus Plötz, 1884; Plesiocera filipalpis Mabille, 1891

= Systasea pulverulenta =

Species of butterfly

Systasea pulverulenta, the Texas powdered skipper, is a butterfly of the family Hesperiidae. It is found in North America from southern and western Texas, south through Mexico to Guatemala in Central America.

The wingspan is 24–35 millimetres (0.94–1.38 in). Adults are on wing from February to December in southern Texas.

The larvae feed on various Malvaceae species. Adults feed on flower nectar.
