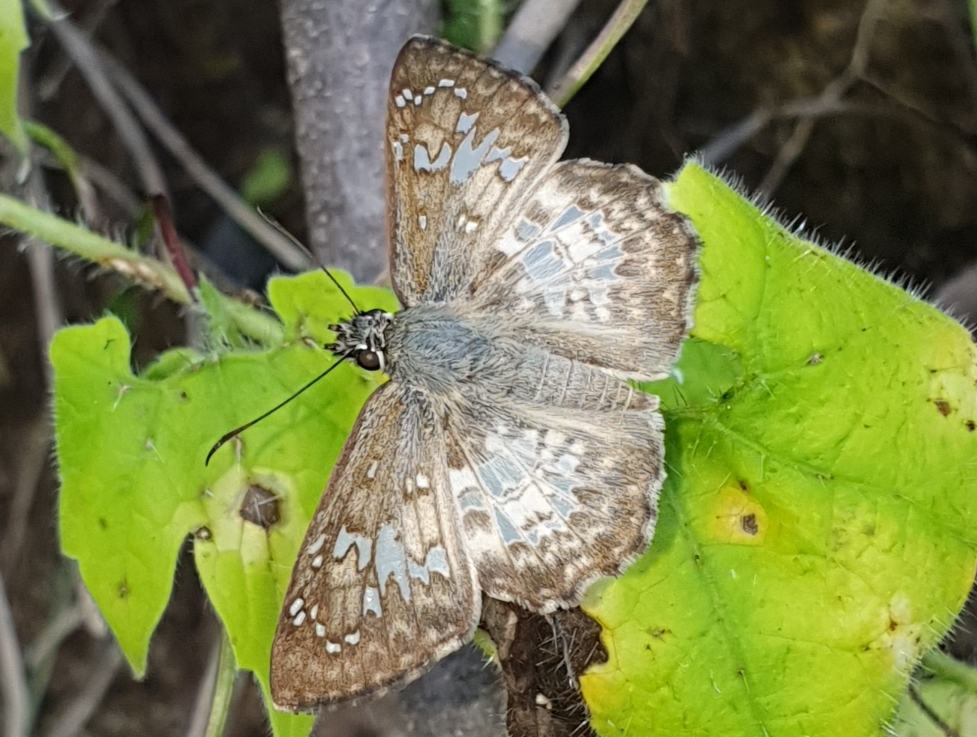
- Zobera marginata

Scientific classification
- Kingdom: Animalia
- Phylum: Arthropoda
- Class: Insecta
- Order: Lepidoptera
- Family: Hesperiidae
- Tribe: Pyrgini
- Genus: Zobera; Freeman, 1970

= Zobera =

Genus of butterflies

Zobera is a genus of skippers in the family Hesperiidae.
