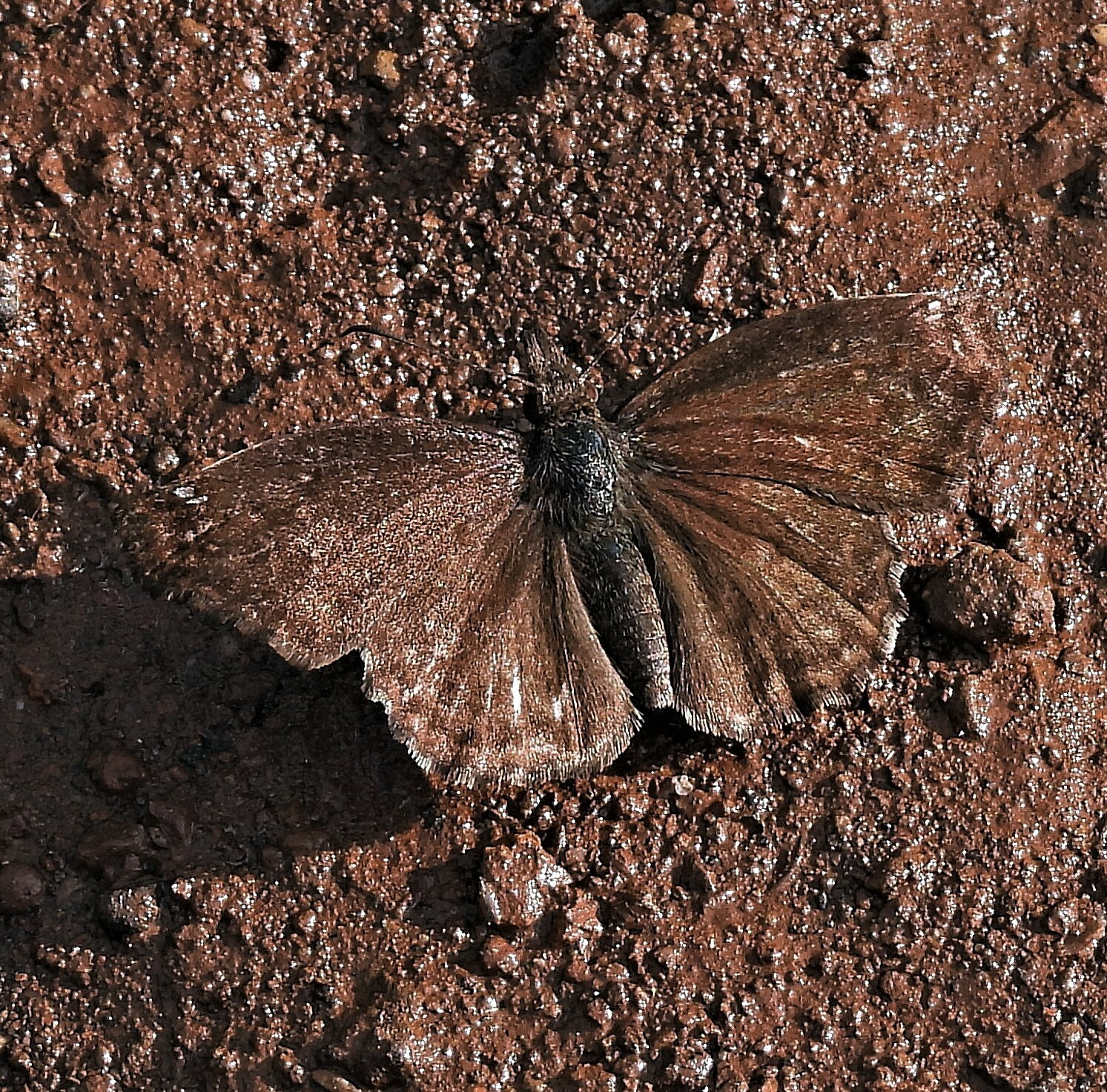
- Anisochoria sublimbata

Scientific classification
- Kingdom: Animalia
- Phylum: Arthropoda
- Class: Insecta
- Order: Lepidoptera
- Family: Hesperiidae
- Tribe: Pyrgini
- Genus: Anisochoria; Mabille, [1877]

= Anisochoria =

Genus of butterflies

Anisochoria is a genus of skippers in the family Hesperiidae.

== Species ==
Recognised species in the genus Anisochoria include:

- Anisochoria bacchus Evans, 1953
- Anisochoria extincta Hayward, 1933
- Anisochoria minorella Mabille, 1897
- Anisochoria pedaliodina Evans, 1953
- Anisochoria polysticta Mabille, 1870
- Anisochoria quadrifenestrata (Bryk, 1953)
- Anisochoria sublimbata Mabille, 1883
- Anisochoria verda Evans, 1953
