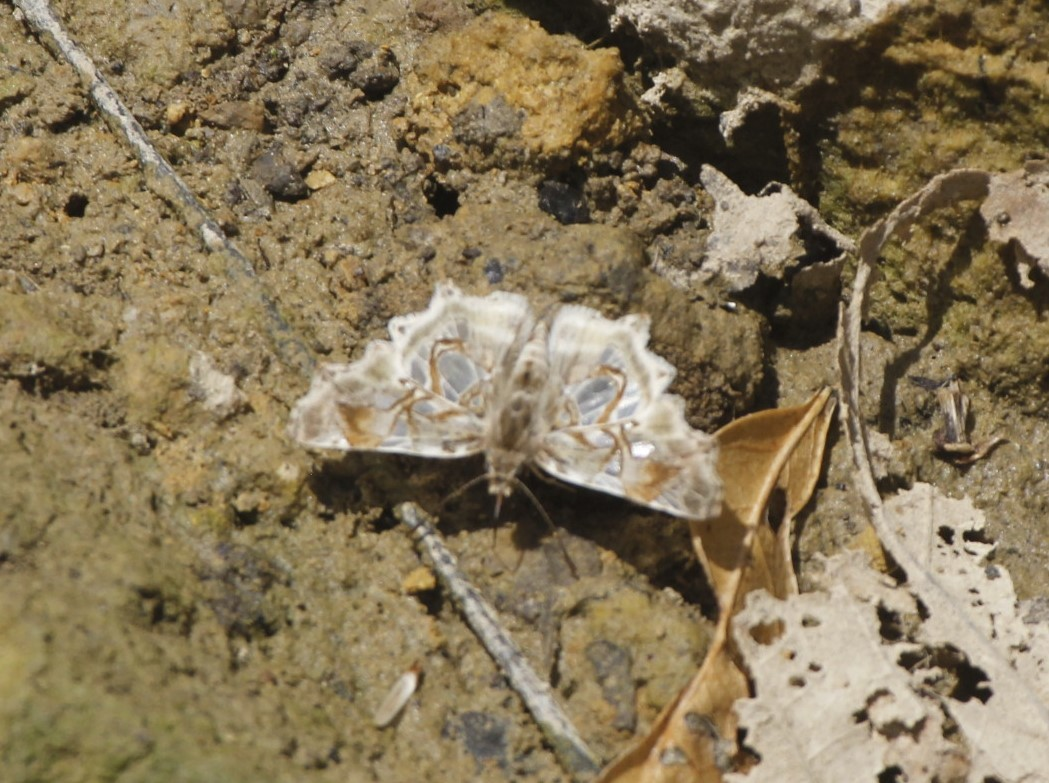
- Onenses hyalophora

Scientific classification
- Kingdom: Animalia
- Phylum: Arthropoda
- Class: Insecta
- Order: Lepidoptera
- Family: Hesperiidae
- Tribe: Pyrgini
- Genus: Onenses; Godman & Salvin, [1895]

= Onenses =

Genus of butterflies

Onenses is a genus of skippers in the family Hesperiidae.
