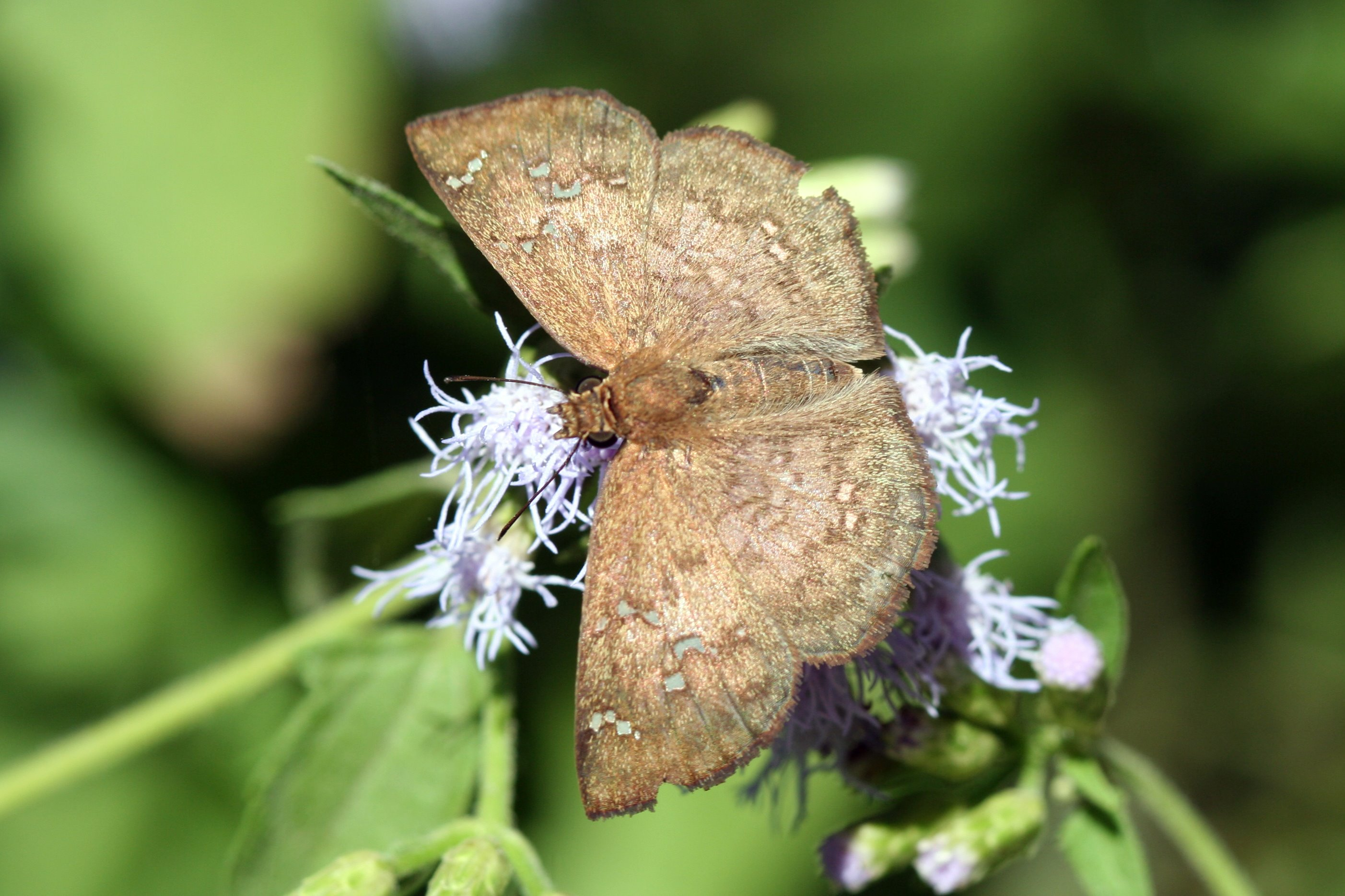

Scientific classification
- Kingdom: Animalia
- Phylum: Arthropoda
- Class: Insecta
- Order: Lepidoptera
- Family: Hesperiidae
- Tribe: Pyrgini
- Genus: Carrhenes; Godman & Salvin, [1895]

= Carrhenes =

Genus of insects

Carrhenes is a genus of skippers in the family Hesperiidae.

== Species ==
Recognised species in the genus Carrhenes include:

- Carrhenes chaeremon Mabille, 1891
- Carrhenes conia Evans, 1953
- Carrhenes decens (Butler, 1874)
- Carrhenes fuscescens (Mabille, 1891)

=== Former species ===
- Carrhenes callipetes Godman and Salvin, [1895] - transferred to Canesia callipetes (Godman and Salvin, [1895])
- Carrhenes canescens (R.Felder, 1869) - transferred to Canesia canescens (R.Felder, 1869)
- Carrhenes lilloi Hayward, 1947 - transferred to Canesia lilloi (Hayward, 1947)
- Carrhenes meridensis Godman and Salvin, [1895] - transferred to Canesia meridensis (Godman and Salvin, [1895])
- Carrhenes pallida Röber, 1925 - transferred to Canesia pallida (Röber, 1925)
- Carrhenes recurva Austin, 2000 - transferred to Canesia recurva (Austin, 2000)
- Carrhenes santes Bell, 1940 - transferred to Santa santes (Bell, 1940)
