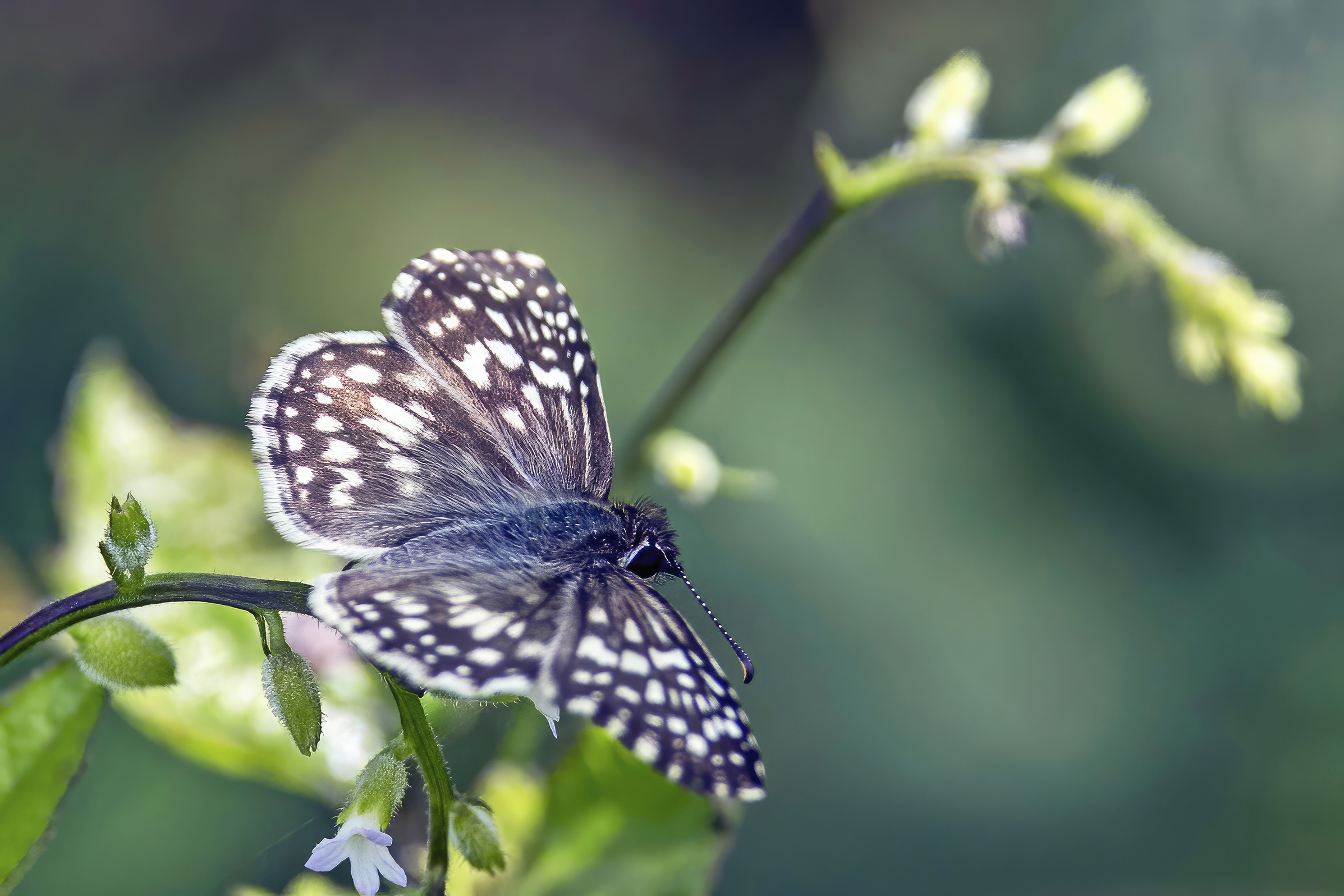
- male, Guatemala

Conservation status
- Secure (NatureServe)

Scientific classification
- Kingdom: Animalia
- Phylum: Arthropoda
- Class: Insecta
- Order: Lepidoptera
- Family: Hesperiidae
- Genus: Burnsius
- Species: B. oileus

Binomial name
- Burnsius oileus (Linnaeus, 1767)

Synonyms
- List: Papilio oileus Linnaeus, 1767; Pyrgus montivagus Reakirt, 1866; Pyrgus adjutrix Plötz, 1884; Hesperia syrichtus var. fumosa Reverdin, 1919; Pyrgus oileus (Linnaeus, 1767); Pyrgus oilus Hübner, [1819] (missp.); Pyrgus oieus Ménétries, 1855 (missp.); Hesperia montivagus Dyar, 1903; Pyrgus fumata Reverdin, 1921 (missp.); Pyrgus montivago Randolph, 1922 (missp.); Pyrgus oilius Kendall & Freeman, 1963 (missp.); Pyrgus ajutrix Miller & Brown, 1983 (missp.); Hesperia montivaga Godman & Salvin, [1899]; Pyrgus syrichthus Butler, 1870 (missp.); Pyrgus syrechtus Druce, 1876 (missp.); Pyrgus syricthus Gundlach, 1881 (missp.); Hesperia syrichtus Dyar, 1903; Pyrgus syrithtus Woodworth, 1913 (missp.); Pyrgus sysichtus Giacomelli, 1923 (missp.); Pyrgus syrictus Williams & Bell, 1930 (missp.); Pyrgus syrichtos Cardoso, 1949 (missp.); Pyrgus syrichtus

= Burnsius oileus =

Tropical checkered skipper

Species of skipper butterfly

Burnsius oileus, the tropical checkered skipper, is a species of skipper (family Hesperiidae). It is found in the United States (Peninsular Florida, the Gulf Coast, and southern Texas), south through the West Indies, Mexico and Central America to Costa Rica. It was transferred to genus Burnsius in 2019, and was previously known as Pyrgus oileus.

The wingspan is 32–38 mm. There are four to five generations throughout the year in southern Texas and Florida.

The larvae feed on several plants in the family Malvaceae, including Sida rhombifolia, Malva, Althaea rosea, Abutilon and Malvastrum. Adults feed on the nectar of the flowers of Sidas species and small-flowered composites such as shepherd's needles.

== Subspecies ==
- Burnsius oileus oileus
- Burnsius oileus syrichtus
