= Pseudodrephalys hypargus =

Scientific classification
- Kingdom: Animalia
- Phylum: Arthropoda
- Class: Insecta
- Order: Lepidoptera
- Family: Hesperiidae
- Genus: Pseudodrephalys
- Species: P. hypargus

Binomial name
- Pseudodrephalys hypargus Mabille, 1891

Species of butterfly

Pseudodrephalys hypargus is a butterfly belonging to the family Hesperiidae. These butterflies are commonly found in Venezuela (Amazonas), Guyana, French Guiana, Brazil (Amazonas, Pará, Mato Grosso, Rondônia), Peru (Madre de Dios).
