= Malvastrum coromandelianum =

Scientific classification
- Kingdom: Plantae
- Clade: Tracheophytes
- Clade: Angiosperms
- Clade: Eudicots
- Clade: Rosids
- Order: Malvales
- Family: Malvaceae
- Genus: Malvastrum
- Species: M. coromandelianum

Binomial name
- Malvastrum coromandelianum (L.) Garcke

Synonyms
- List: Malva coromandeliana L.; Malva coromandelica Panz.; Malva domingensis Spreng. ex DC.; Malva havanensis Sessé & Moc.; Malva lindheimeriana Scheele; Malva subhastata Cav.; Malva tricuspidata R.Br.; Malvastrum lindheimerianum (Scheele) Walp.; Malvastrum ruderale Hance ex Walp.; Malvastrum tricuspidatum A.Gray; Malveopsis coromandeliana (L.) Morong; Sida fauriei H.Lév.; Sida oahuensis H.Lév.

Species of plant from the Americas

Malvastrum coromandelianum, also known as threelobe false mallow, is an annual or perennial herb or shrub native to North and South America. It has been introduced to many other areas of the world including Australia, Africa, and southern and eastern Asia.
