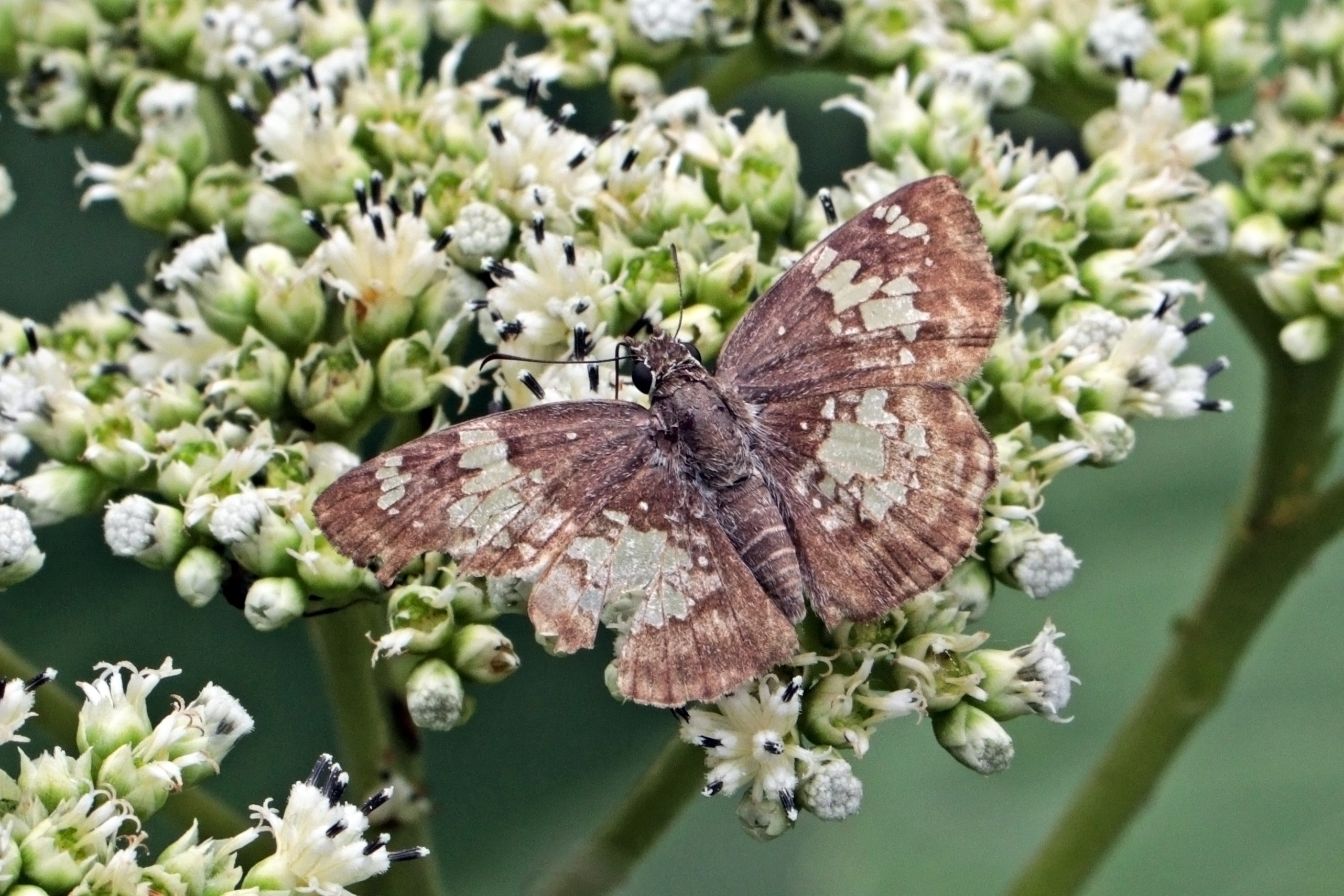
- Xenophanes tryxus Glassy-winged skipper, Panama

Scientific classification
- Kingdom: Animalia
- Phylum: Arthropoda
- Class: Insecta
- Order: Lepidoptera
- Family: Hesperiidae
- Tribe: Pyrgini
- Genus: Xenophanes; Godman & Salvin, [1895]

= Xenophanes (butterfly) =

Genus of butterflies

Xenophanes is a genus of skippers in the family Hesperiidae.
