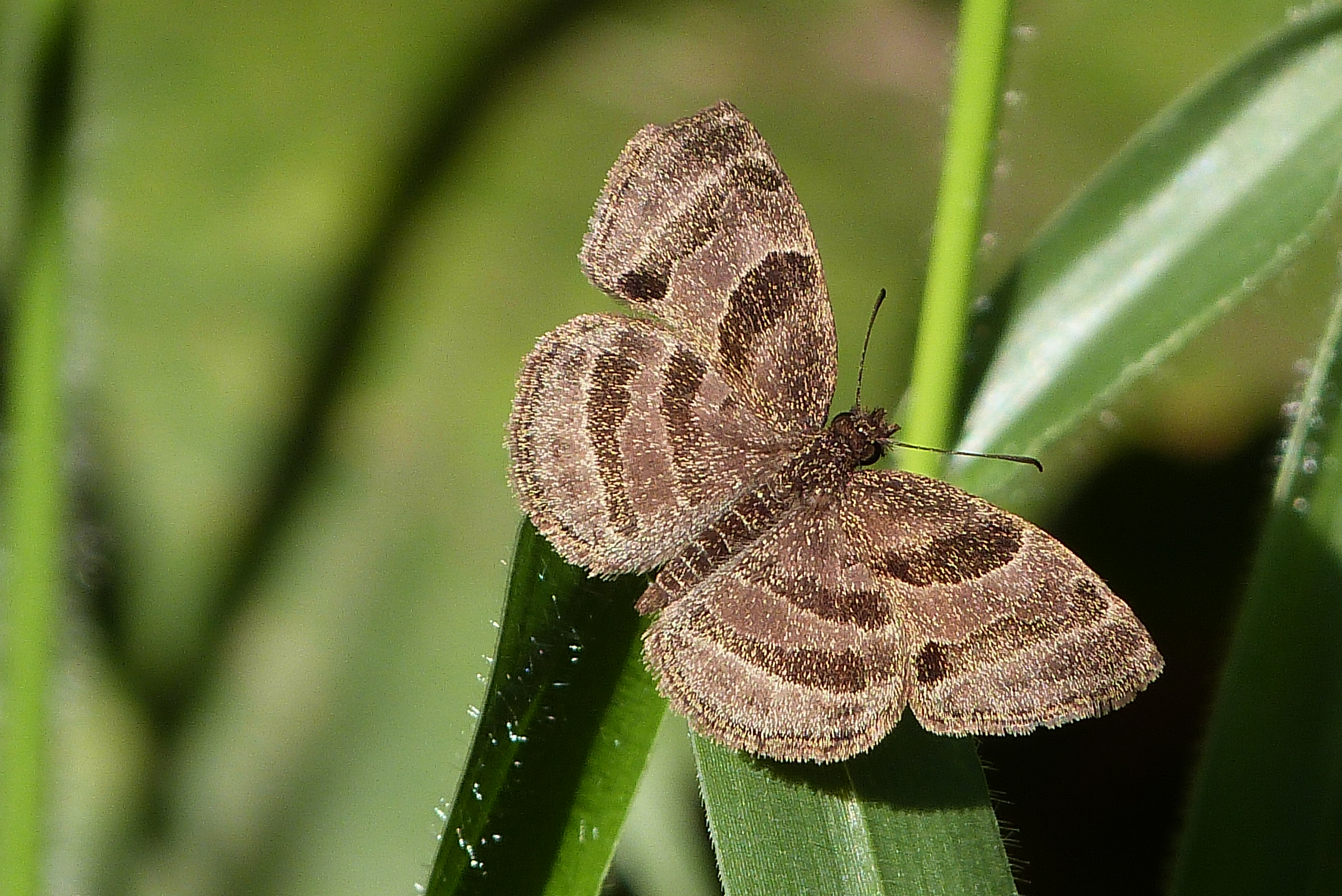

Scientific classification
- Kingdom: Animalia
- Phylum: Arthropoda
- Class: Insecta
- Order: Lepidoptera
- Family: Hesperiidae
- Tribe: Pyrgini
- Genus: Trina; Evans, 1953

= Trina (butterfly) =

Genus of butterflies

Trina is a genus of skippers in the family Hesperiidae.
