= John Burns (entomologist) =

American entomologist

John McLauren Burns is an entomologist, was a curator of Lepidoptera in the Entomology Department at the National Museum of Natural History, Smithsonian Institution.

== Academic background ==
Burns has completed his BS at Johns Hopkins University (1954) & MS, PhD at University of California, Berkeley (1957, 1961).

== Fields of study ==
Burns is an expert in Lepidoptera (skipper butterflies), evolutionary biology and poetry. He has discovered a new species of skipper butterflies and named it as Pseudodrephalys sohni found at Brazil.

== Publications ==
Some of his notable publications are as follows:

- DNA barcodes distinguish species of tropical Lepidoptera 2006
- Pan-neotropical genus Venada (Hesperiidae: Pyrginae) is not monotypic: Four new species occur on one volcano in the Area de Conservacion Guanacaste 2005
- What's in a name? Lepidoptera: Hesperiidae: Pyrginae: Telemiades Hubner 1819: new combinations Telemiades corbulo (Stoll) and Telemiades oiclus (Mabille) 2005
- Wedding biodiversity inventory of a large and complex Lepidoptera fauna with DNA barcoding 2005
- Ten species in one: DNA barcoding reveals cryptic species in the neotropical skipper butterfly Astraptes fulgerator 2004
- Pseydodrephalys: A New Genus Comprising Three Showy, Neotropical Species 1998
