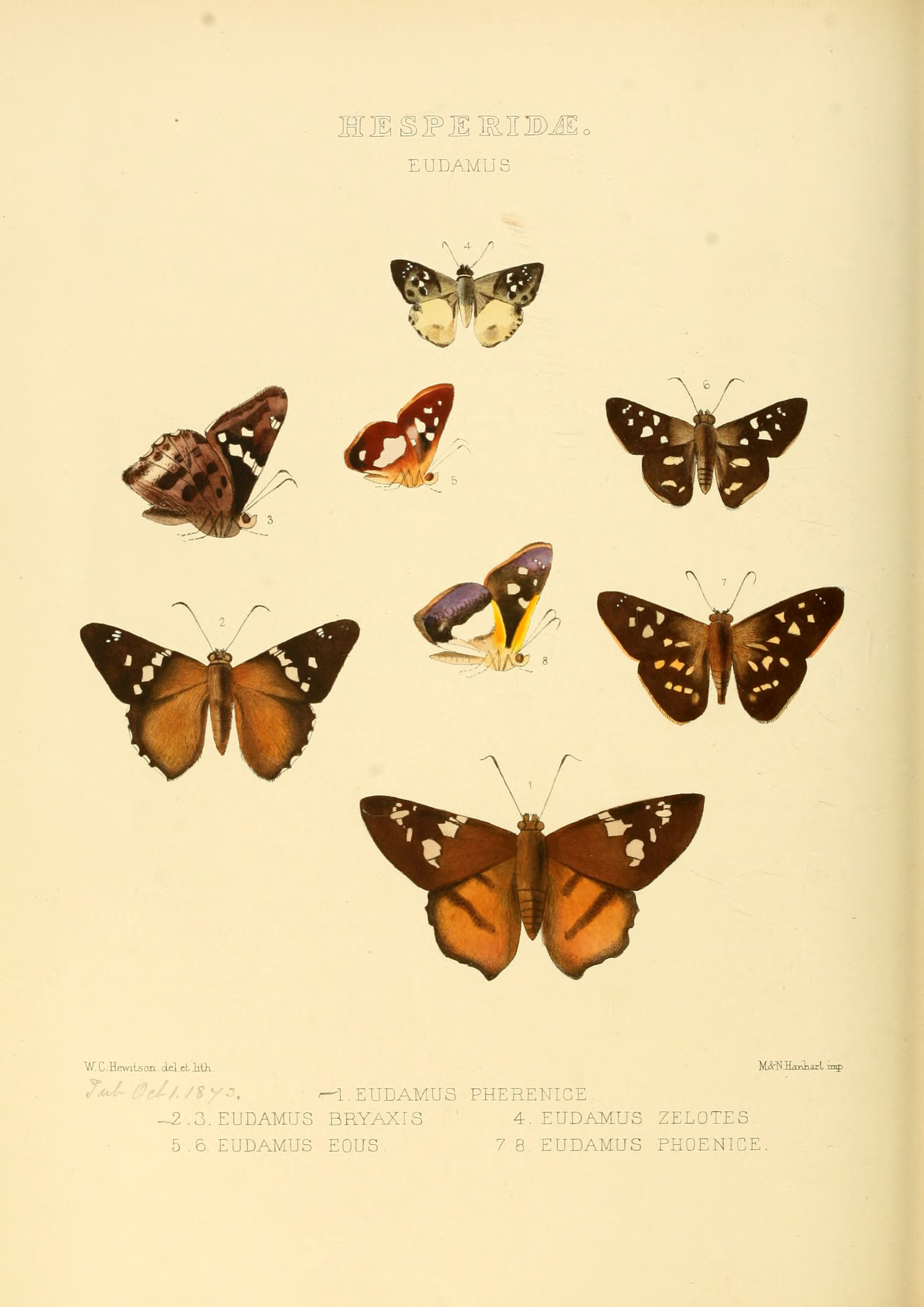
- Clito zelotes figure 4

Scientific classification
- Kingdom: Animalia
- Phylum: Arthropoda
- Class: Insecta
- Order: Lepidoptera
- Family: Hesperiidae
- Subtribe: Clitina
- Genus: Clito; Evans, 1953

= Clito (butterfly) =

Genus of butterflies

Clito is a Neotropical genus of spread-winged skipper in the family Hesperiidae.

== Species ==
Recognised species in the genus Clito include:

- Clito aberrans (Draudt, 1924)
