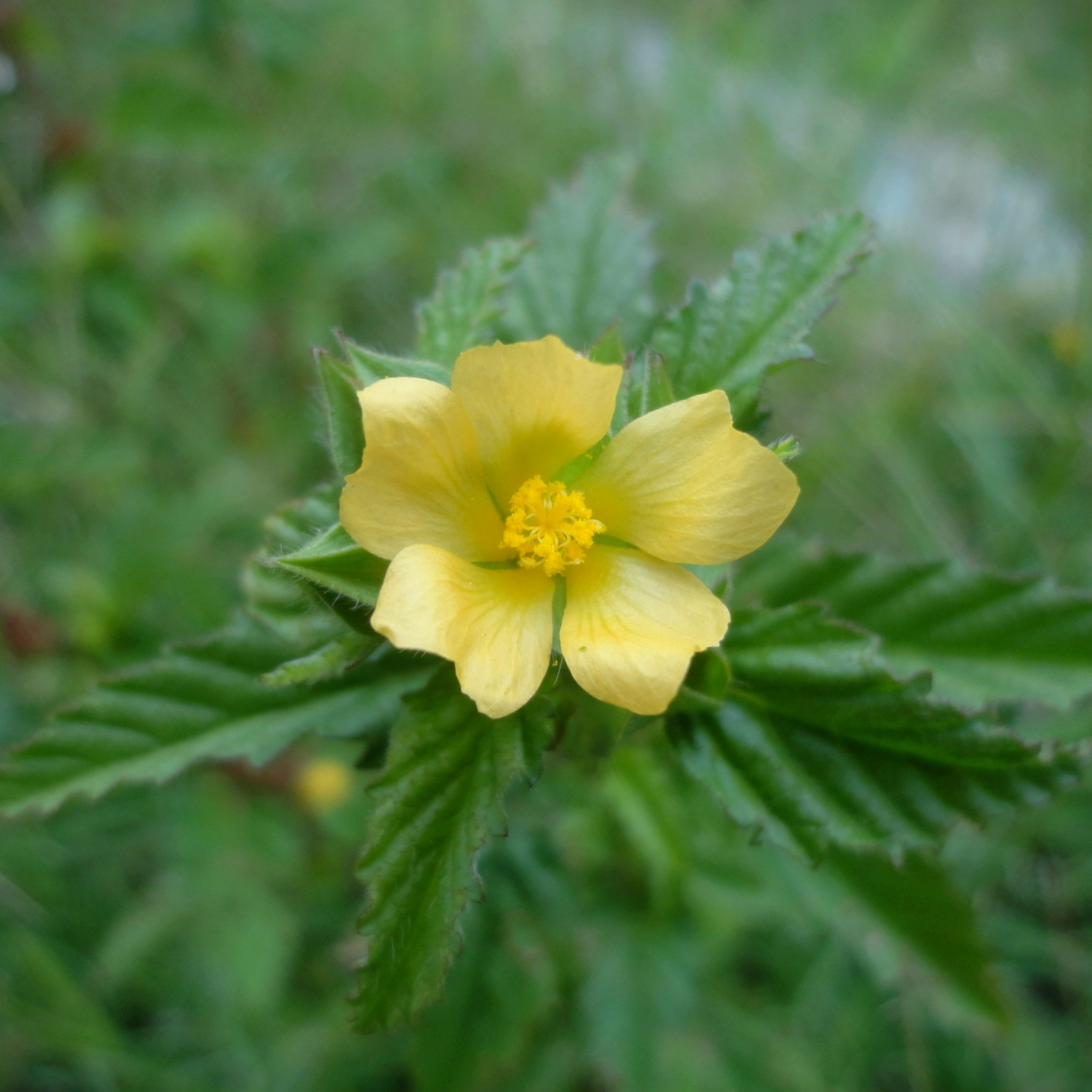
- Malvastrum coromandelianum

Scientific classification
- Kingdom: Plantae
- Clade: Tracheophytes
- Clade: Angiosperms
- Clade: Eudicots
- Clade: Rosids
- Order: Malvales
- Family: Malvaceae
- Tribe: Malveae
- Genus: Malvastrum; A.Gray

= Malvastrum =

Genus of plants

Malvastrum is a genus of flowering plants belonging to the family Malvaceae. Its native range is the New World.

== Species ==
Species:

- Malvastrum amblyphyllum R.E.Fr.
- Malvastrum americanum (L.) Torr.
- Malvastrum aurantiacum (Scheele) Walp.
- Malvastrum bicuspidatum (S.Watson) Rose
- Malvastrum boyuibeanum Krapov.
- Malvastrum chillagoense Domin
- Malvastrum corchorifolium (Desr.) Britton ex Small
- Malvastrum coromandelianum (L.) Garcke
- Malvastrum cristobalianum Krapov.
- Malvastrum fryxellii (S.R.Hill) Krapov.
- Malvastrum grandiflorum Krapov.
- Malvastrum guatemalense Standl. & Steyerm.
- Malvastrum hillii Fryxell, León de la Luz & M.Domínguez
- Malvastrum hispidum (Pursh) Hochr.
- Malvastrum interruptum K.Schum.
- Malvastrum ionthocarpum Krapov.
- Malvastrum multicuspidatum Krapov.
- Malvastrum pucarense Krapov.
- Malvastrum scoparioides Ulbr.
- Malvastrum spiciflorum (Hassl.) Krapov.
- Malvastrum tomentosum (L.) S.R.Hill
- Malvastrum trifidum Krapov.
- Malvastrum uniapiculatum Krapov.
