= Eriboea =

The name Eriboea may refer to:

- Eriboea (mythology)
- In biology, two species of butterflies:
  - Eriboea dolon, synonym for Polyura dolon
  - Eriboea aile, synonym for Baeotus aeilus
