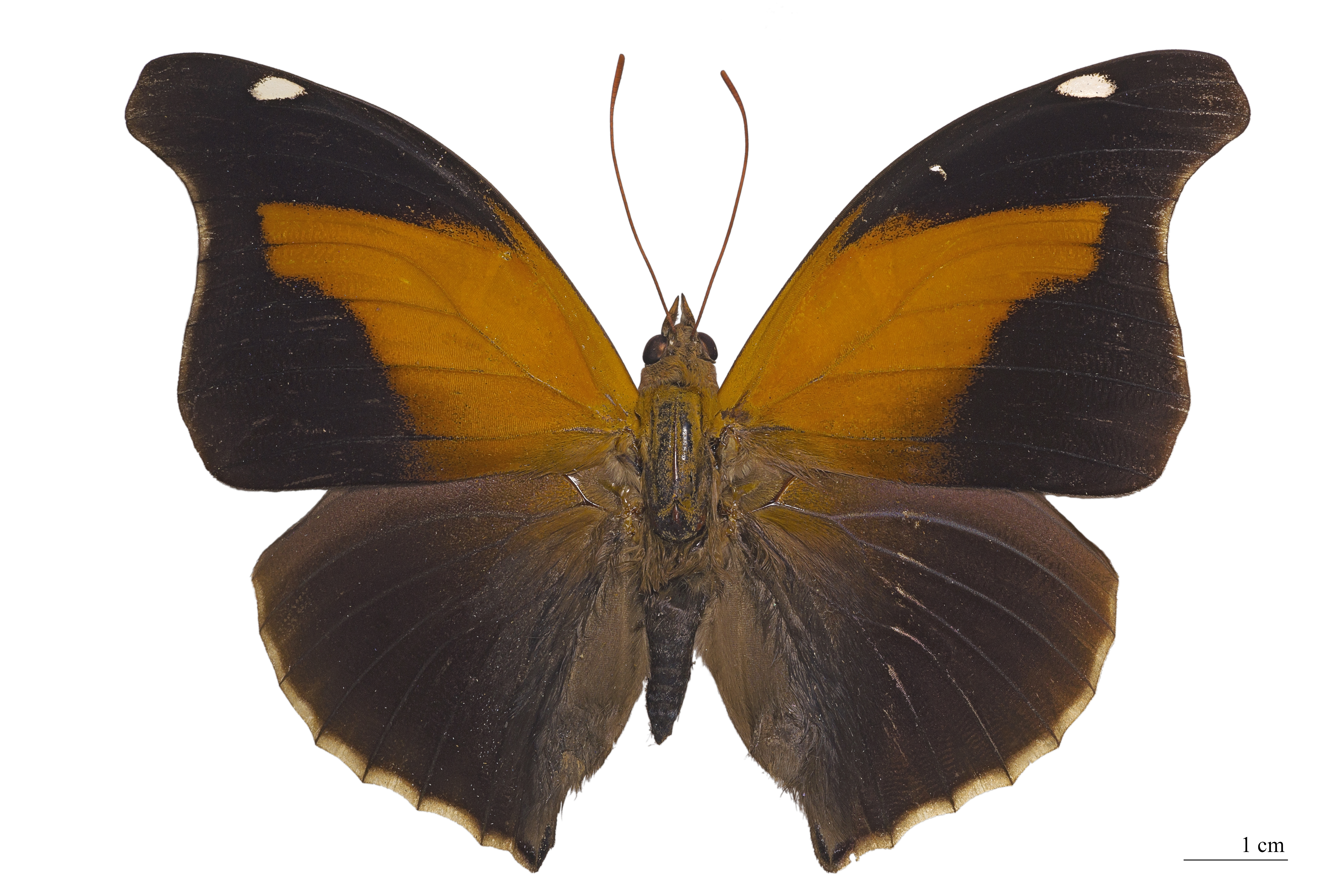
- Historis odius. Dorsal side
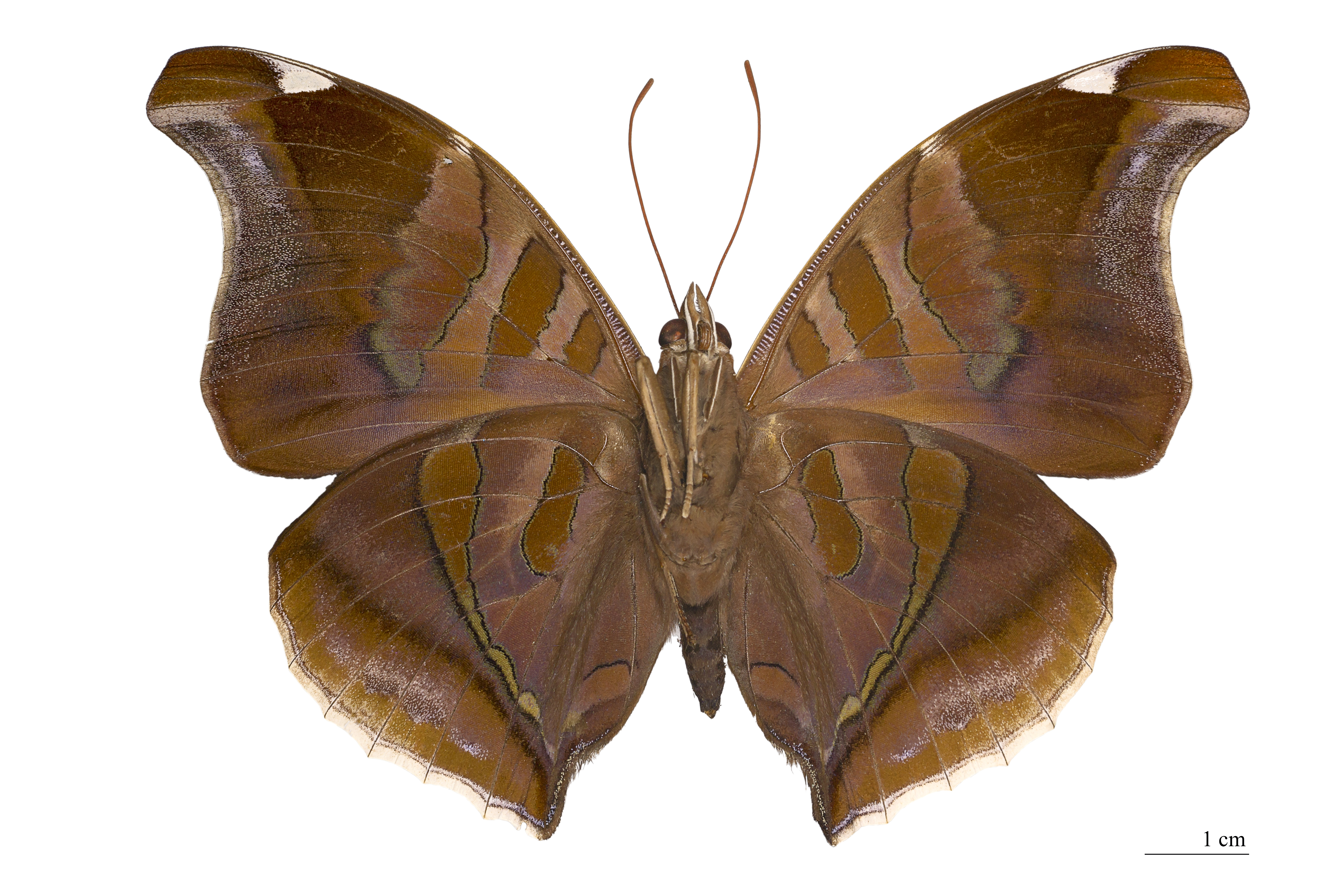
- Ventral side

Scientific classification
- Domain: Eukaryota
- Kingdom: Animalia
- Phylum: Arthropoda
- Class: Insecta
- Order: Lepidoptera
- Family: Nymphalidae
- Tribe: Coeini
- Genus: Historis
- Species: H. odius

Binomial name
- Historis odius (Fabricius, 1775)

= Historis odius =

Species of butterfly

Historis odius, the orion cecropian, is a species of crescents, checkerspots, anglewings, etc. in the butterfly family Nymphalidae.

== Distribution ==
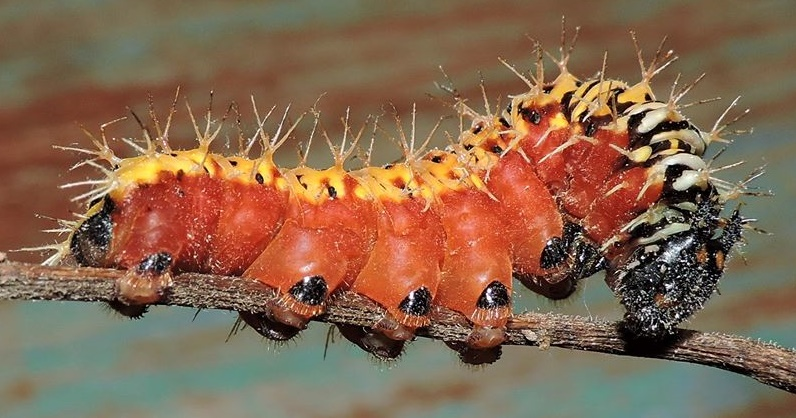
Caterpillar of Historis odius

This species can be found in North America.The MONA or Hodges number for Historis odius is 4545.

== Subspecies ==
These three subspecies belong to the species Historis odius:

- Historis odius dious Lamas, 1995^{i g}
- Historis odius odius (Fabricius, 1775)^{i g}
- Historis odius orion Fabricius, 1775^{c g}

Data sources: i = ITIS, c = Catalogue of Life, g = GBIF, b = Bugguide.net
