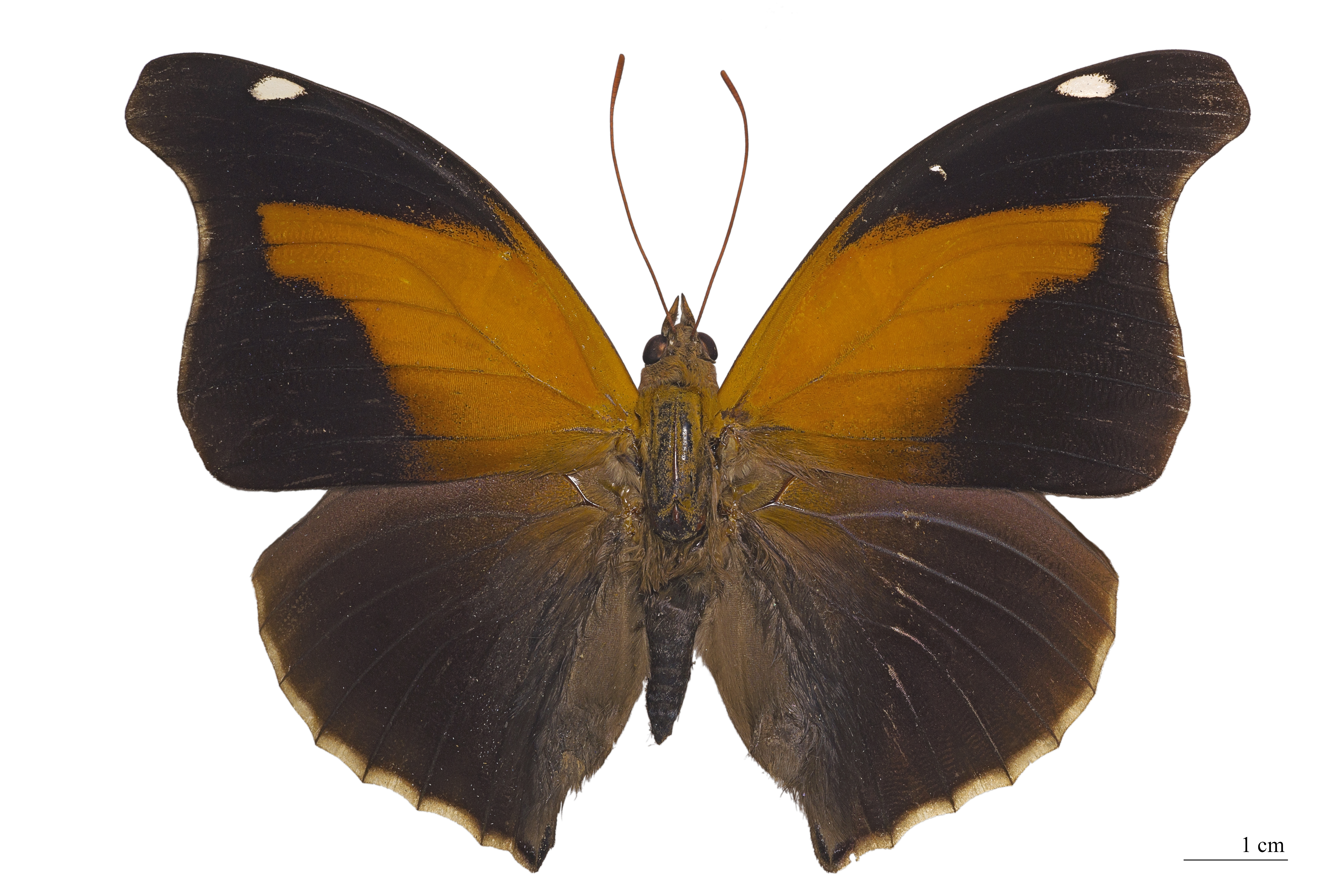
- Historis odius (male) - MHNT

Scientific classification
- Domain: Eukaryota
- Kingdom: Animalia
- Phylum: Arthropoda
- Class: Insecta
- Order: Lepidoptera
- Family: Nymphalidae
- Subfamily: Nymphalinae
- Tribe: Coeini; Scudder, 1893

Genera
- See text

= Coeini =

Tribe of butterflies

Coeini is a tribe of brush-footed butterflies. Its members are found in the Neotropical realm.

== List of genera ==
- Baeotus Hemming, 1939
- Colobura Billberg, 1820
- Historis Hübner, 1819
- Pycina Doubleday, 1849
- Smyrna Hübner, 1823
- Tigridia Hübner, 1819 (sometimes in Nymphalini)
