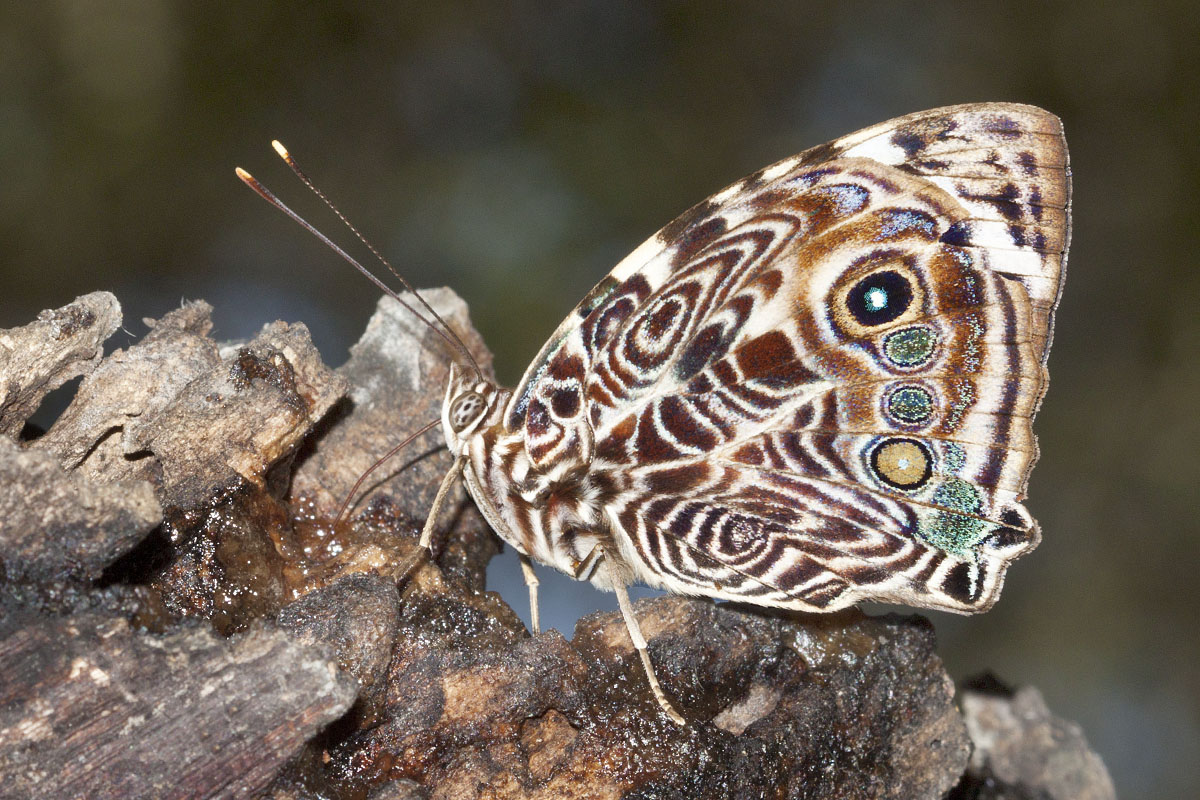
- Smyrna blomfildia

Scientific classification
- Kingdom: Animalia
- Phylum: Arthropoda
- Clade: Pancrustacea
- Class: Insecta
- Order: Lepidoptera
- Family: Nymphalidae
- Tribe: Coeini
- Genus: Smyrna; Hübner, [1823]

= Smyrna (butterfly) =

Genus of insects

Smyrna is a genus of butterflies in the family Nymphalidae found from Mexico to South America. They have a typical wingspan of 3 to 3.5 inches and mostly eat rotting fruit.

== Species ==
- Smyrna blomfildia (Fabricius, 1781) – Blomfild's beauty
- Smyrna karwinskii Geyer, [1833] – Karwinski's beauty
