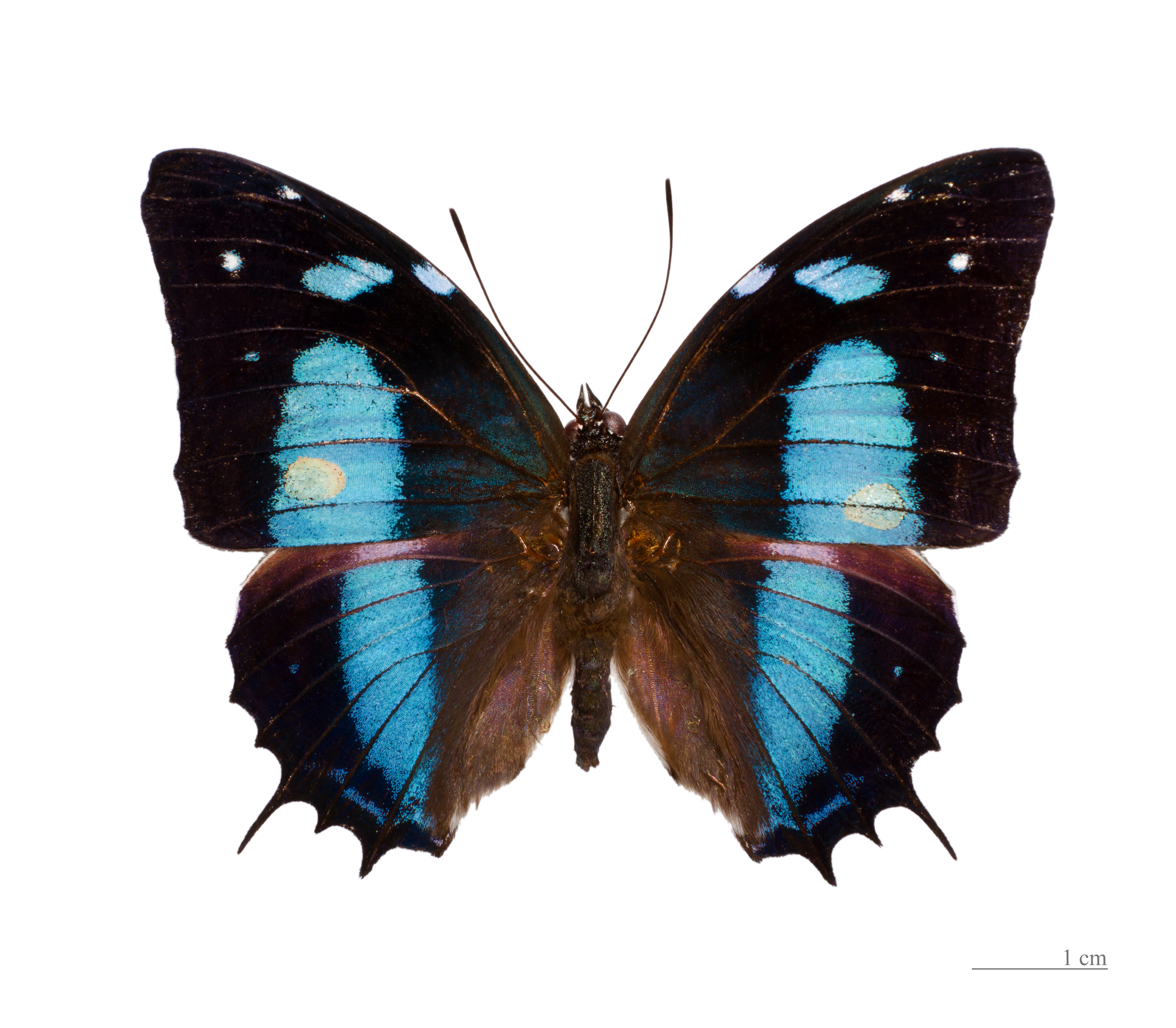
- Baeotus aeilus - MHNT

Scientific classification
- Domain: Eukaryota
- Kingdom: Animalia
- Phylum: Arthropoda
- Class: Insecta
- Order: Lepidoptera
- Family: Nymphalidae
- Tribe: Coeini
- Genus: Baeotus; Hemming, 1939

= Baeotus =

Genus of butterflies

Baeotus is a genus of butterflies in the family Nymphalidae found in Central America, the Caribbean, and South America.

== Species ==
There are four recognised species:

- Baeotus aeilus (Stoll, 1780)
- Baeotus baeotus (Doubleday, 1849)
- Baeotus deucalion (C. & R. Felder, 1860)
- Baeotus japetus (Staudinger, 1885)
