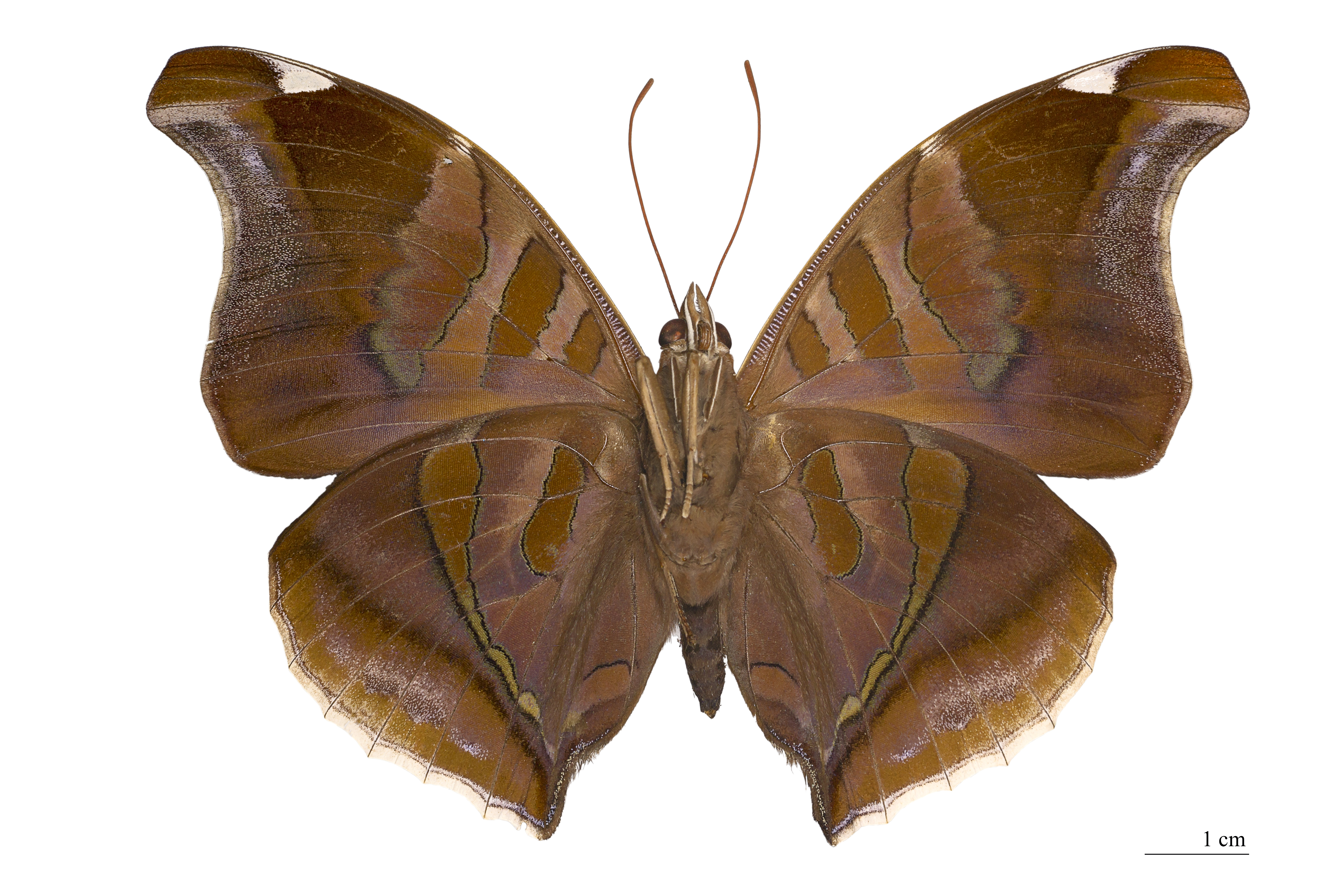
- Historis odius

Scientific classification
- Domain: Eukaryota
- Kingdom: Animalia
- Phylum: Arthropoda
- Class: Insecta
- Order: Lepidoptera
- Family: Nymphalidae
- Tribe: Coeini
- Genus: Historis; Hübner, [1819]

Synonyms
- Coea Hübner, [1819]; Aganisthos Boisduval & Le Conte, [1835]; Megistanis Doubleday, 1844

= Historis =

Genus of insects

Historis is a genus of butterflies in the family Nymphalidae found from Mexico to South America.

== Species ==
There are two recognised species:

- Historis acheronta (Fabricius, 1775) – dashwing, tailed cecropian
- Historis odius (Fabricius, 1775) – stinky leafwing, Orion
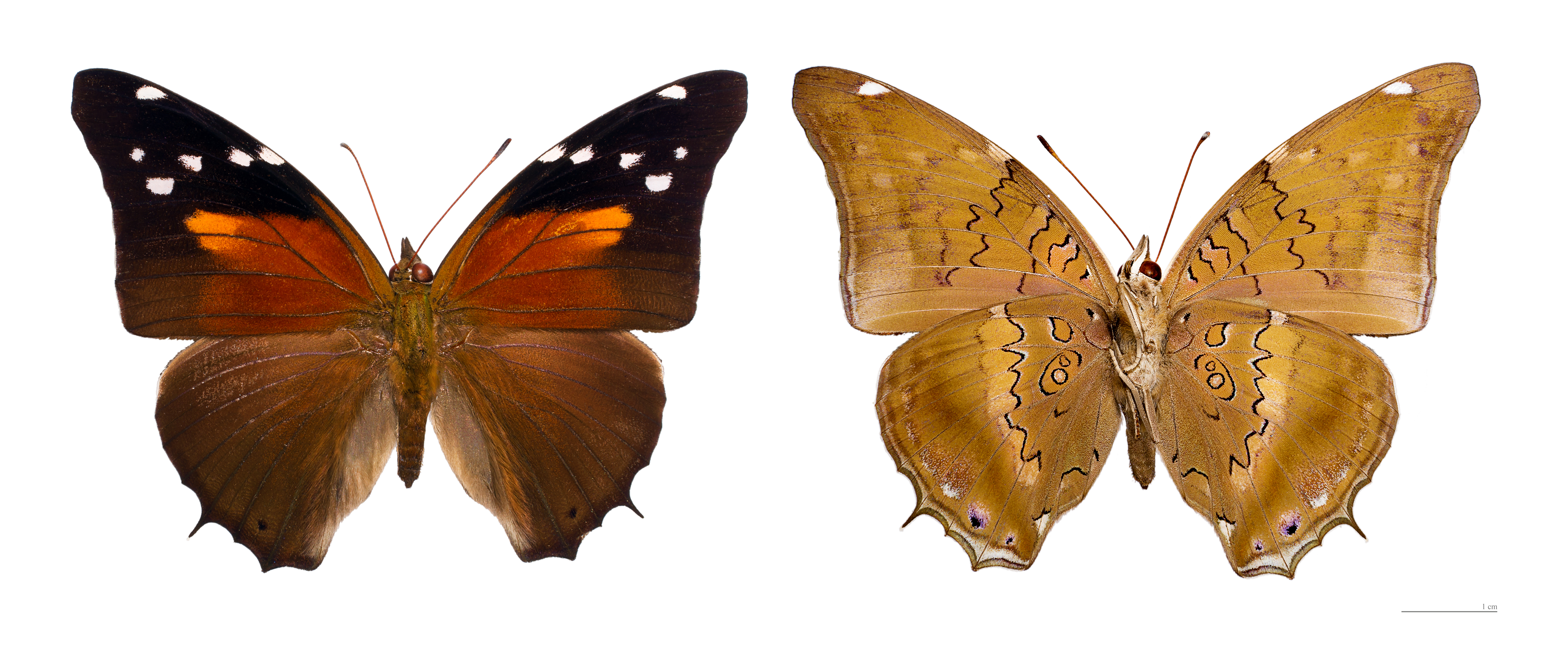
Historis acheronta - MHNT

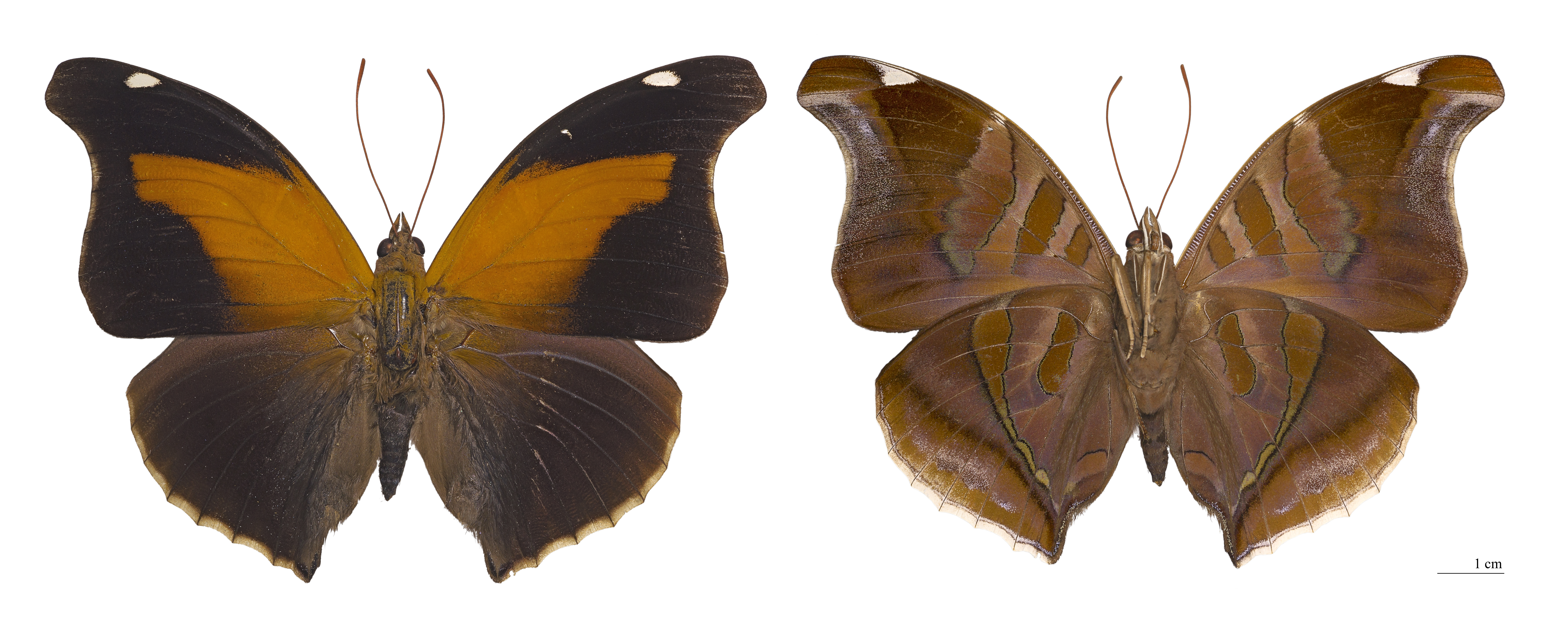
Historis odius – MHNT
