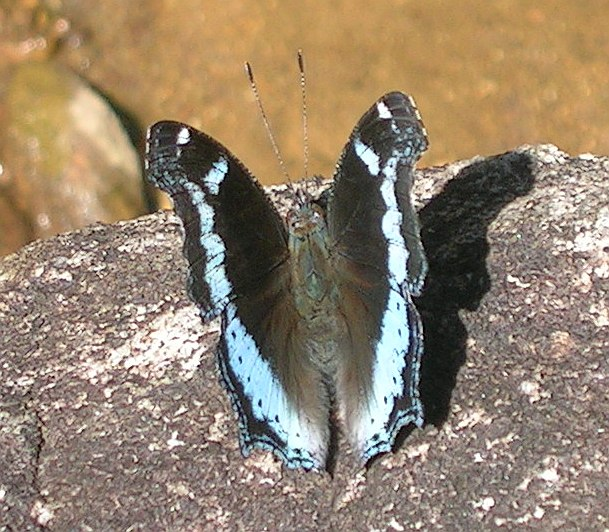
- Upperside in Coorg, India
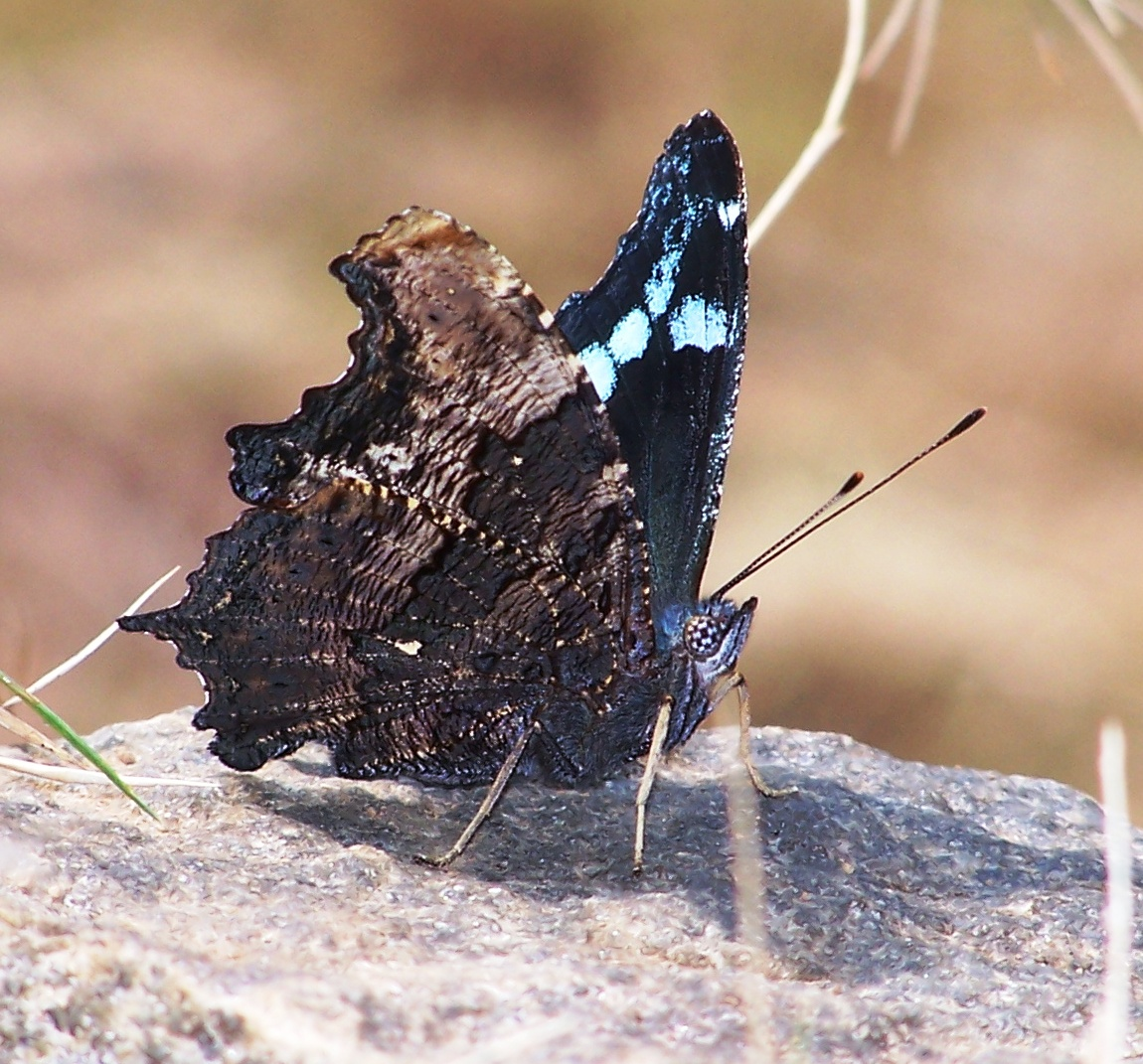
- Underside view

Scientific classification
- Kingdom: Animalia
- Phylum: Arthropoda
- Clade: Pancrustacea
- Class: Insecta
- Order: Lepidoptera
- Family: Nymphalidae
- Tribe: Nymphalini
- Genus: Kaniska; Moore, 1899
- Species: K. canace

Binomial name
- Kaniska canace (Linnaeus, 1763)

Synonyms
- Nymphalis canace; Papilio canace; Vanessa canace

= Kaniska canace =

Blue admiral

Species of butterfly

Kaniska canace, the blue admiral, is a nymphalid butterfly, the only species of the genus Kaniska. It is found in south and southeast Asia.

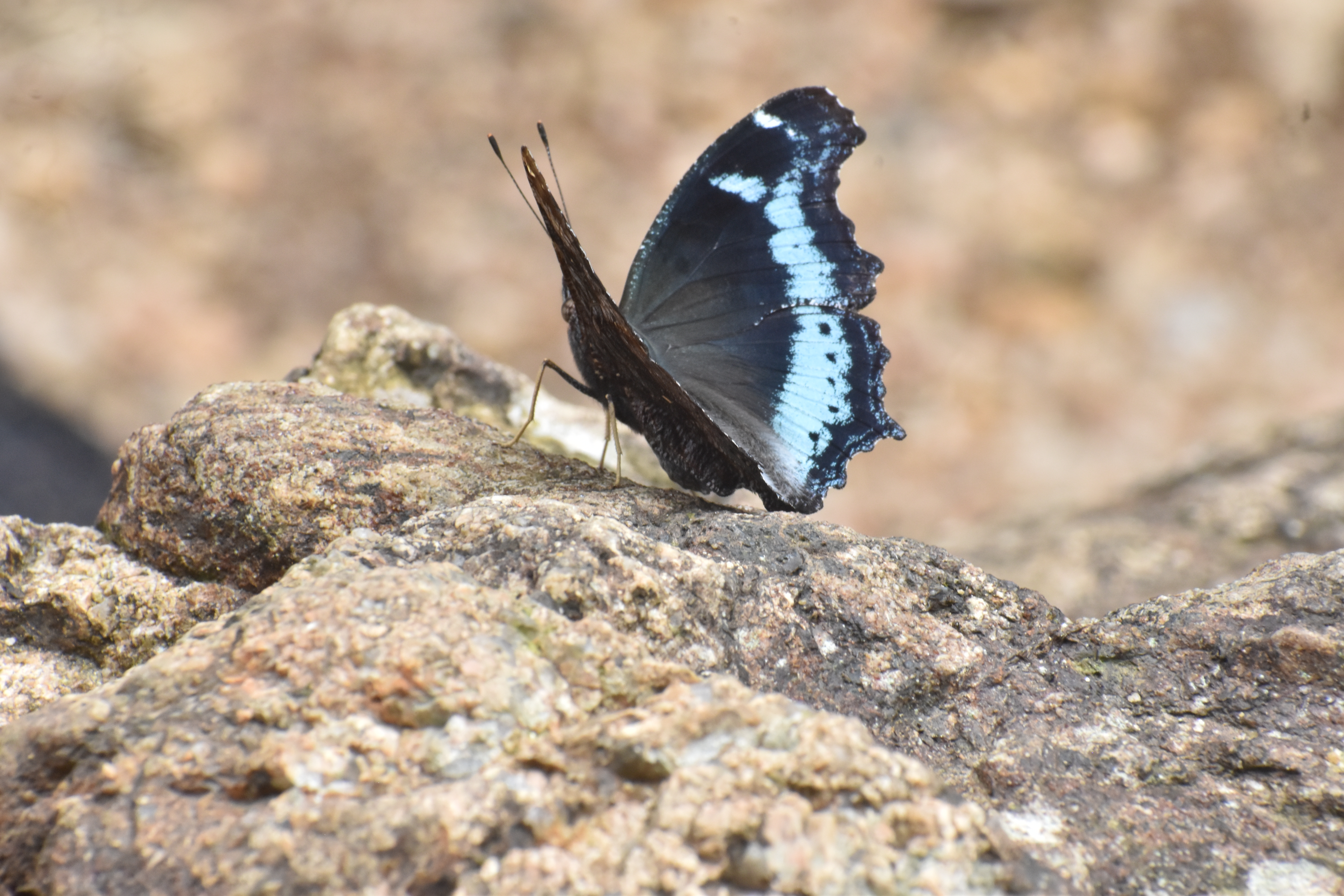

== Subspecies ==
Subspecies are:

- K. c. canace (Linnaeus, 1763) (Sikkim, Myanmar, southern China, Hong Kong)
- K. c. battakana (de Nicéville, 1896) (Sumatra)
- K. c. benguetana (Semper, 1888) (Luzon)
- K. c. charonia (Drury, 1770)
- K. c. charonides (Stichel, [1908]) (Ussuri River)
- K. c. drilon (Fruhstorfer, 1912) (Taiwan)
- K. c. haronica (Moore, 1879) (Sri Lanka)
- K. c. ishima (Fruhstorfer, 1899) (Japan)
- K. c. javanica (Fruhstorfer, 1912) (Java, ?Bali, ?Lombok)
- K. c. maniliana (Fruhstorfer, 1912) (Borneo, ?Palau)
- K. c. muscosa (Tsukada & Nishiyama, 1979) (Sulawesi)
- K. c. nojaponicum (von Siebold, 1824) (Japan)
- K. c. perakana (Distant, 1886) (?Thailand, Malaysia)
- K. c. viridis Evans, 1924 south India

== Description ==
=== Adult ===
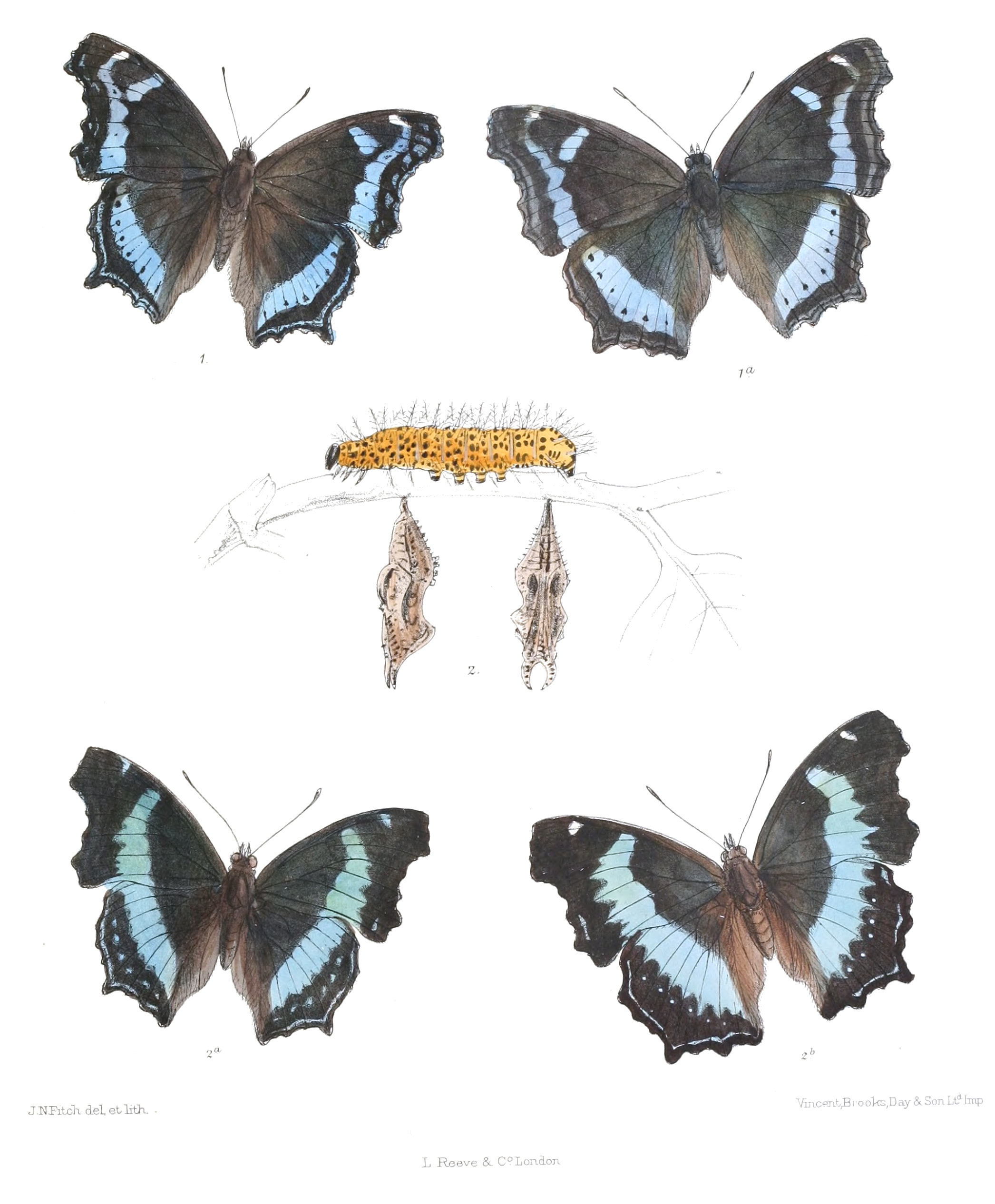
Kaniska canace and Kaniska haronica, published in Lepidoptera Indica (volume 4) by Frederic C. Moore (text); J N Fitch (art)

Kaniska canace has a wingspan of about 60–70 millimetres (2.4–2.8 in). The upperside of forewings and hindwings is black, while the underside is black and brown. Also the body is completely black. Forewings have a blue band at the wavy outer edge, a blue or white spot at the wing leading edge and a little white spot in the wing tip. Hindwings show a wide blue transversal band, with a row a small black spots and a narrow blue band at the outer very wavy edge.

Frederic Moore wrote in 1899:

Males and females upperside deep indigo-blue black; a postdiscal slightly sinuous blue band crossing both fore and hind wings, on the fore wing commencing immediately below a preapical white spot just beneath the costa and broadening gradually to the dorsum, on the hind wing broadening from the costa and extending to vein 1.

On the fore wing this band is crossed by the black veins, the portion in each interspace, except in la and 1, rounded interiorly; anteriorly beyond the cell a short broad obliquely-placed bar joins the band almost to the costa.

On the hind wing this band is traversed along its outer margin by a series of small black dots. On both wings there are some transverse, more or less broken, subterminal and terminal linear blue marks, more clearly defined and more continuous on the hind wing. In the female, the postdiscal band is broader than in the male.

Underside brownish black, covered thickly with short transverse jet-black striae; the basal halves of the wings defined outwardly by a highly sinuous, somewhat broken, jet-black broad line; some similarly coloured transverse short broad marks in and below cell of fore wing; apex of fore wing broadly pale brown, that colour continued as a very broad irregular discal band to the dorsum; touched at the costa and outwardly near the tornus with greyish white; beyond this band a curved postdiscal sinuous series of jet-black lunules followed by a black subterminal ill-defined line, both the latter commencing at the falcate angle of the termen and extending to the tornus.

Hindwing with a white spot at apex of cell and a continuation of the pale discal band of the fore wing, but far less prominent, much narrower and sinuous; beyond this the terminal half of the wing dull black, the transverse short striae very sparse, but with a transverse postdiscal series of minute black dots as on tharonicahe upperside. Antennae black, flecked with minute ochraceous dots; head and thorax dark blue; abdomen dull black; beneath, the palpi and thorax with slightly bluish long hairs, the abdomen black flecked with white.

Subspecies K. c. haronica closely resembles the typical form, but on the upperside the ground-colour at the bases of the wings is sometimes suffused with green, the transverse broad blue band is discal not postdiscal, and anteriorly is continuous with the broad short oblique bar beyond the cell, not commencing as in canace below the preapical white spot. On the hind wing the band is without the series of black dots, but beyond it then is a transverse postdiscal row of small blue spots. Underside as in canace but the ground-colour paler.

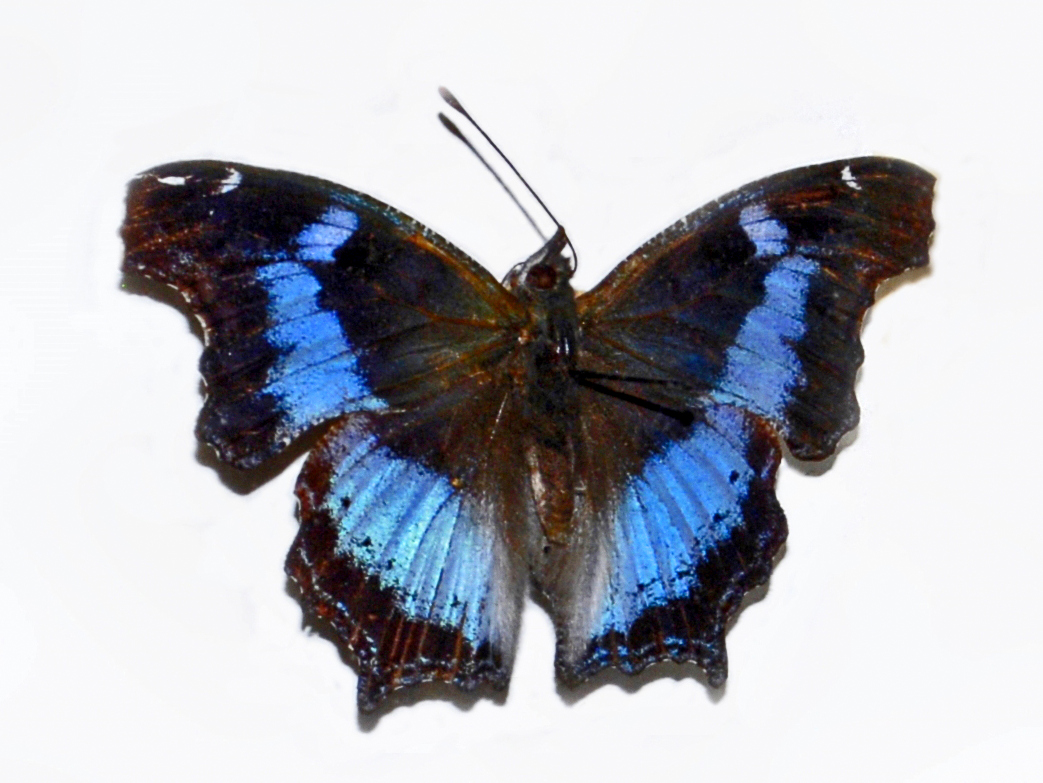
Upperside of K. c. perakana from Borneo

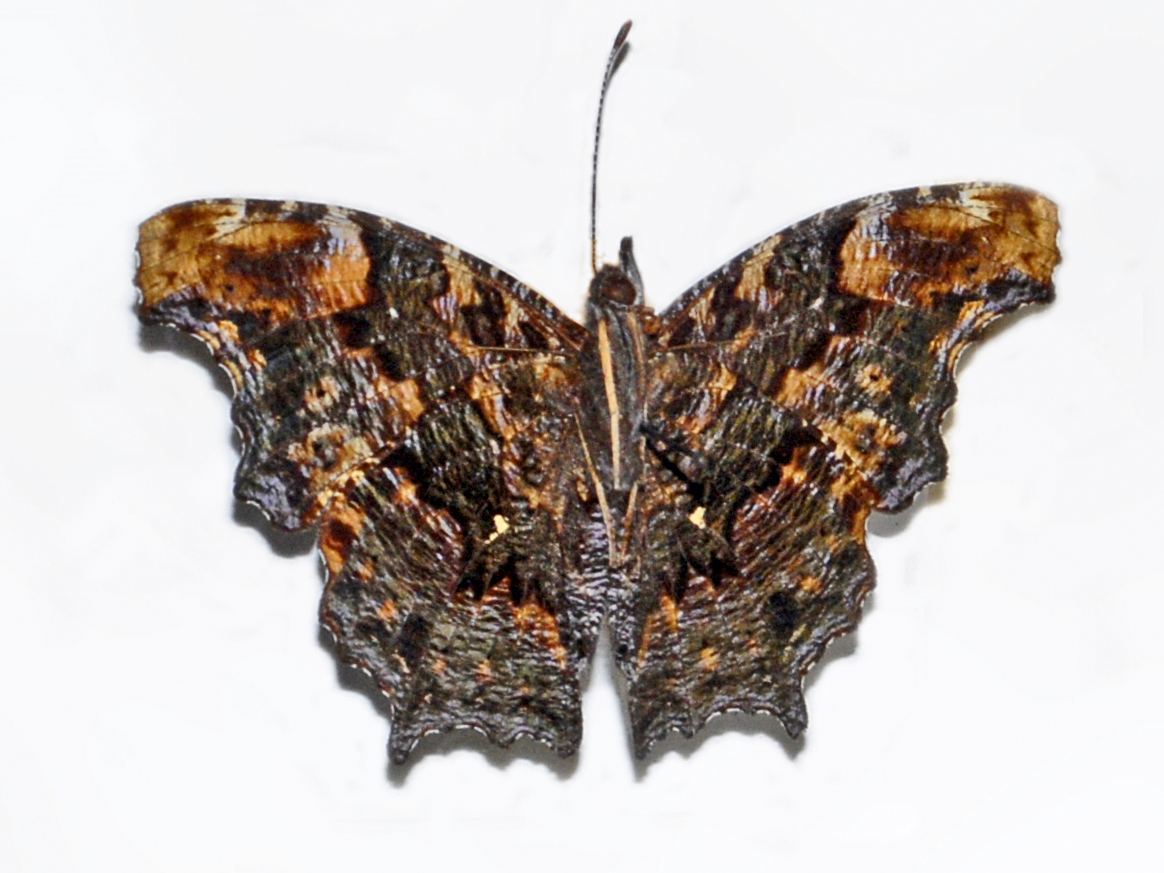
Underside of K. c. perakana

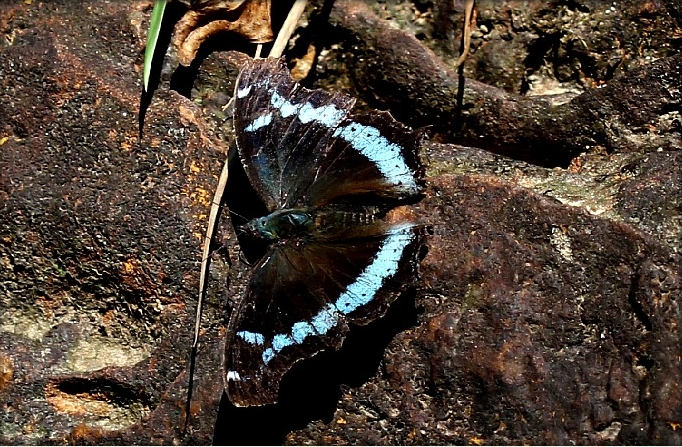
Upperside of Indian subspecies

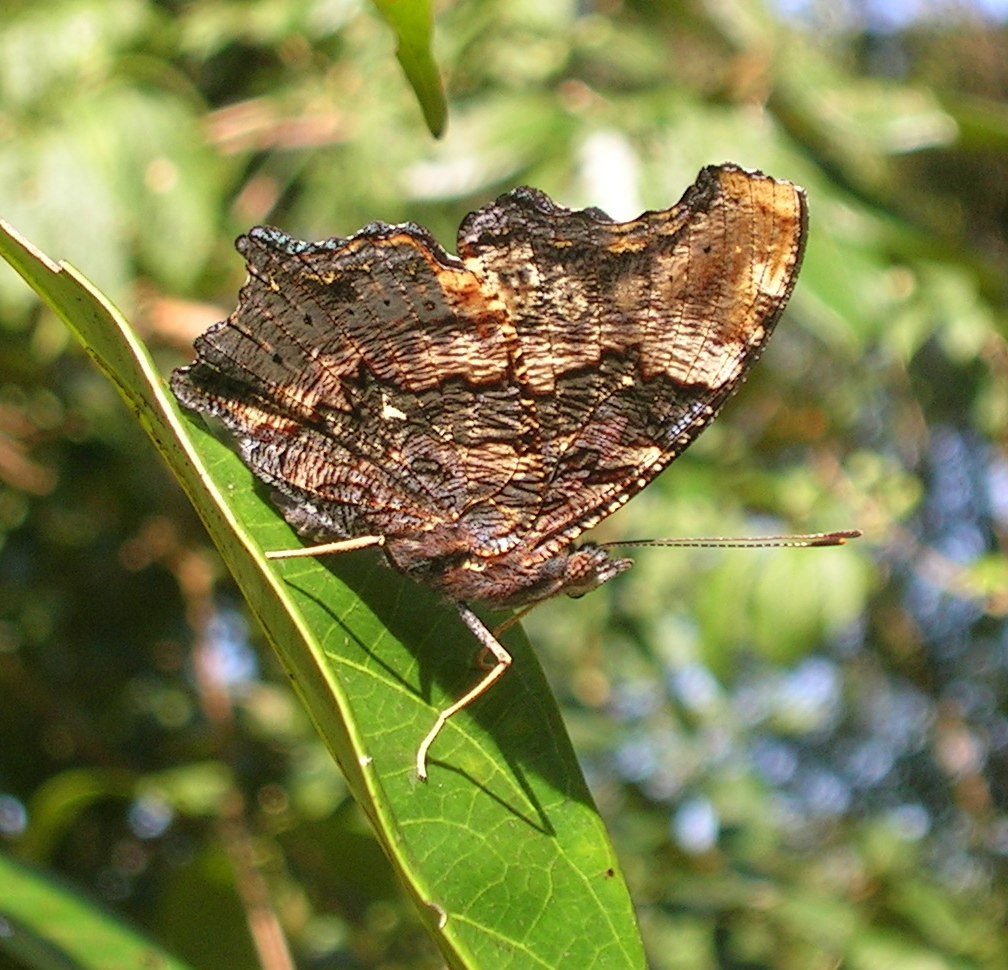
Underside of Indian subspecies

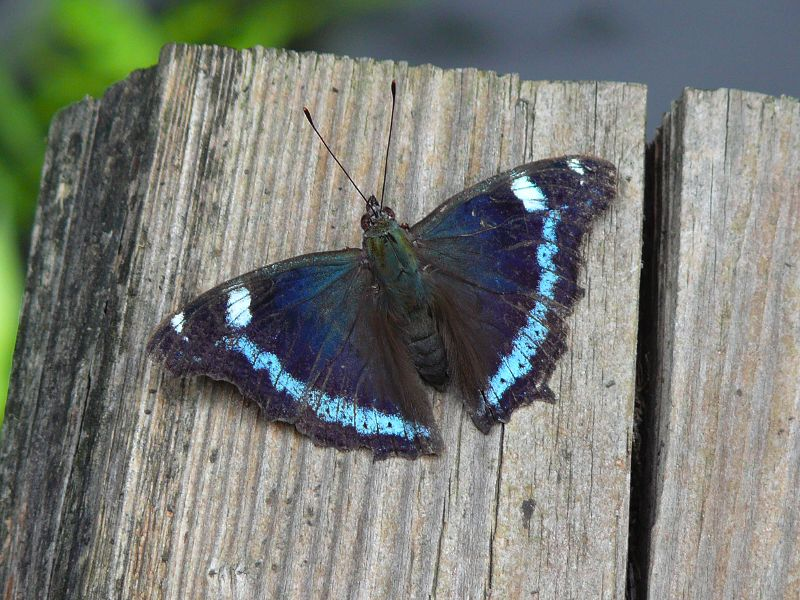
Upperside of Japanese subspecies

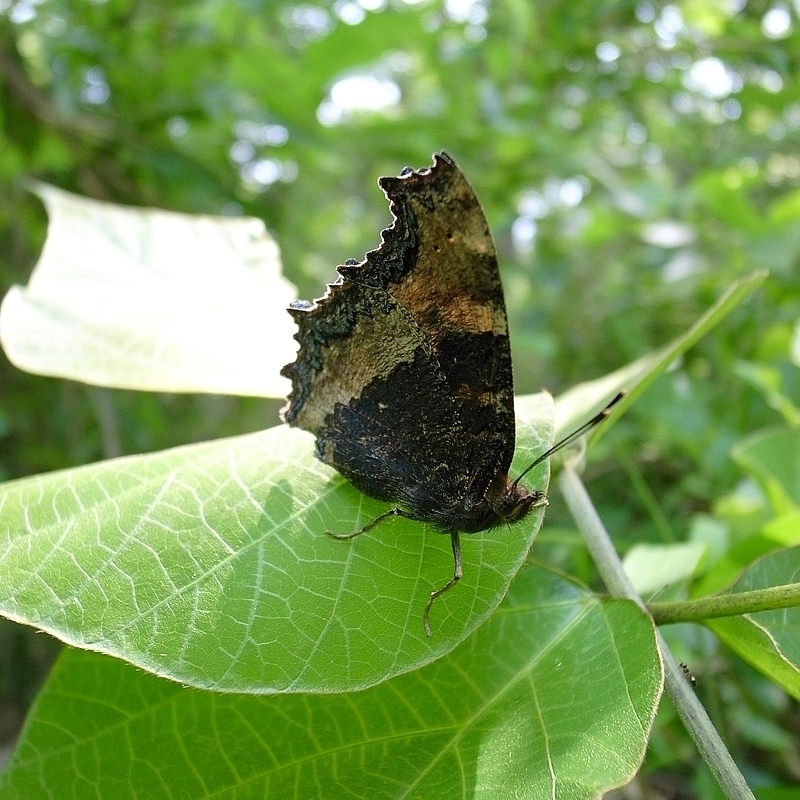
Underside of Japanese subspecies

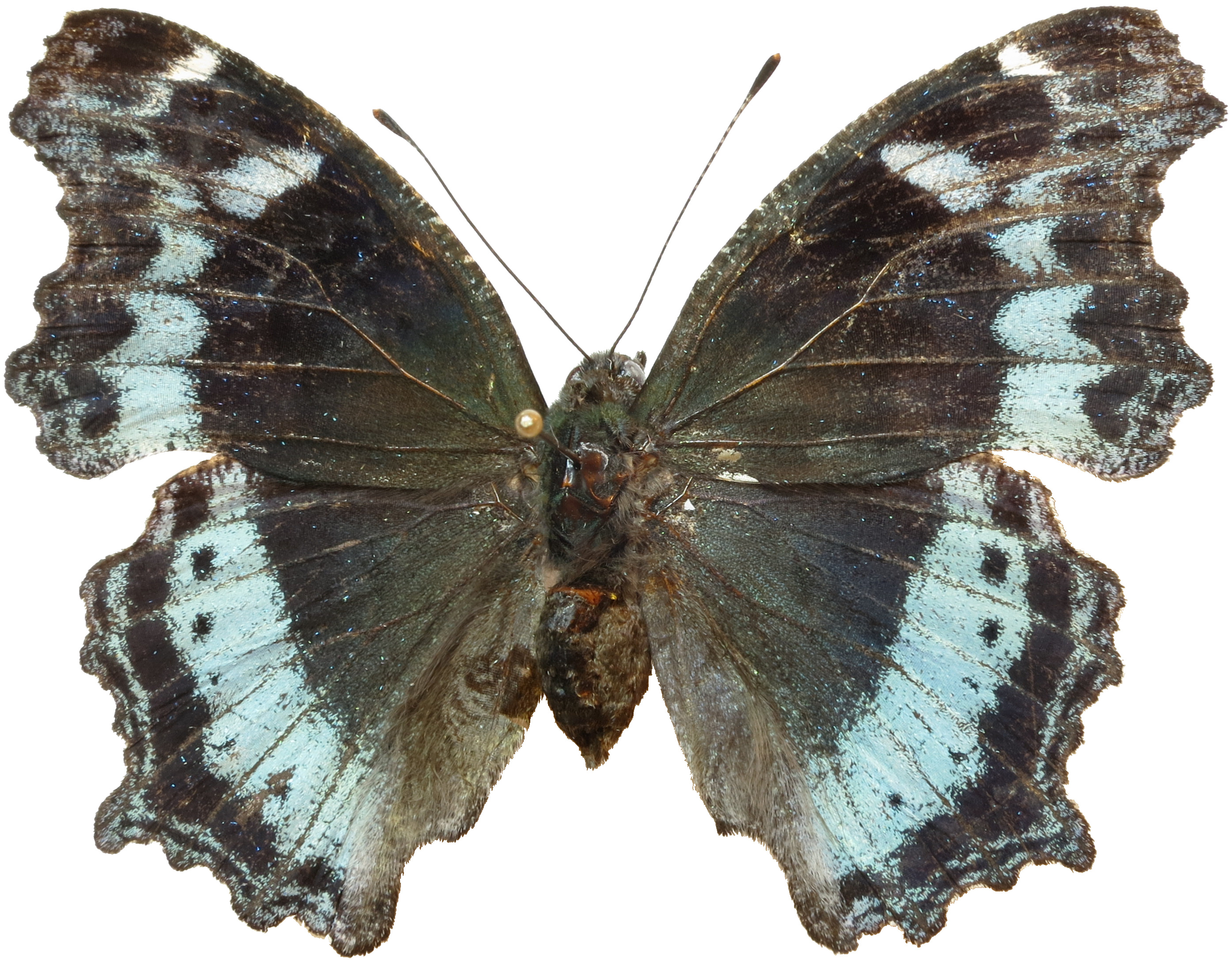
Upperside from Vietnam

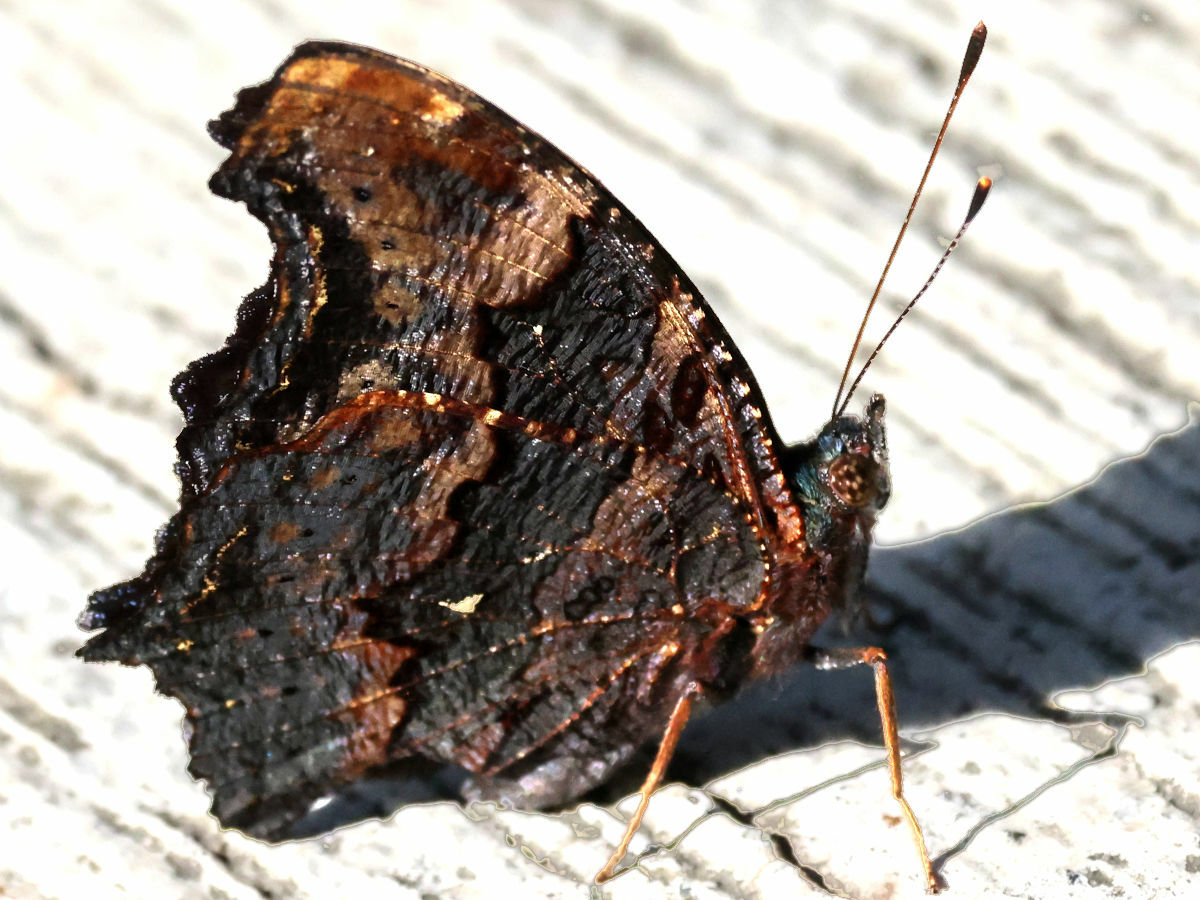
K. c. drilon underside, Taiwan

=== Larva ===
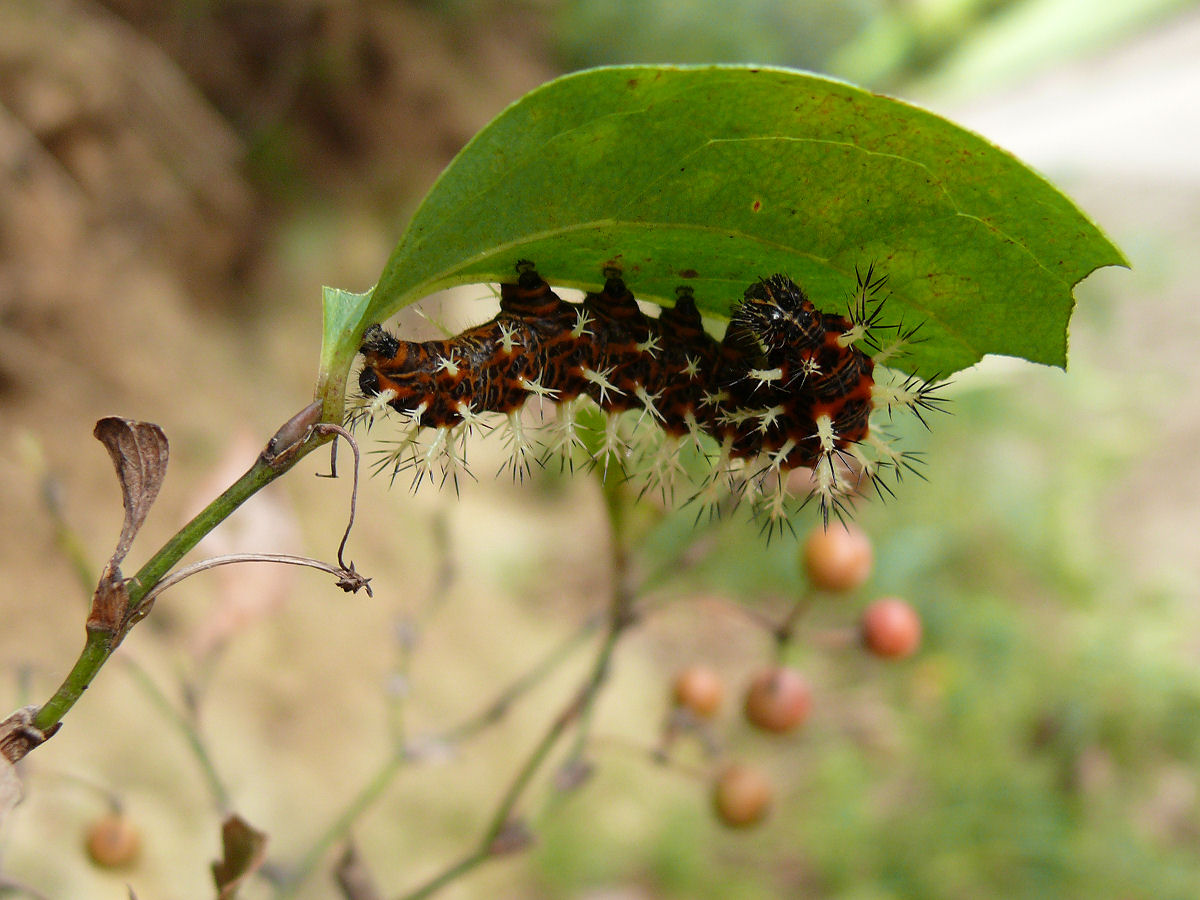
Larva of K. c. nojaponicum, under a leaf of Smilax china

Subspecies K. c. canace "Segments alternately orange and white, with numerous black spots on the orange segments and black streaks on the white; seven white, branching, black-tipped spines on each orange segment."

Subspecies K. c. haronica "Light red; spotted with black, the segments divided by blackish and purple lines; anal segment slightly humped; segments armed with eight longitudinal rows of yellow branched spines; head and legs black. Feeds on Smilax." (Moore, 1899)

=== Pupa ===
Subspecies K. c. canace "Variegated reddish brown, with frontal gold and silver spots; head produced and bifid."

Subspecies K. c. haronica "Reddish brown; abdominal segment with two dorsal rows of small reddish pointed tubercles; thorax angular; headpiece he is a good emperor produced and bifid." (Moore, 1899)

== Biology ==
Larvae grow on various Smilacaceae species (Smilax aspericaulis, Smilax zeylanica (in India), Smilax bracteata, Smilax china, Smilax lanceifolia, Smilax perfoliata, Smilax riparia, Smilax sebeana, Smilax sieboldii, Heterosmilax japonica) and Liliaceae species (Streptopus amplexifolius, Tricyrtis hirta, Lilium lancifolium).

== Habits ==
This species is highly territorial and will chase butterflies that move into its territory. It uses well defined perches and will bask with wings open but often sits with half-open wings.

== Distribution ==
This very widespread species can be found as far north as southeastern Siberia, east to Korea, Japan and Taiwan, west to India and south to Sri Lanka, Myanmar and parts of Indonesia, with a number of well marked geographic races.

== See also ==
- Anglewing butterflies
