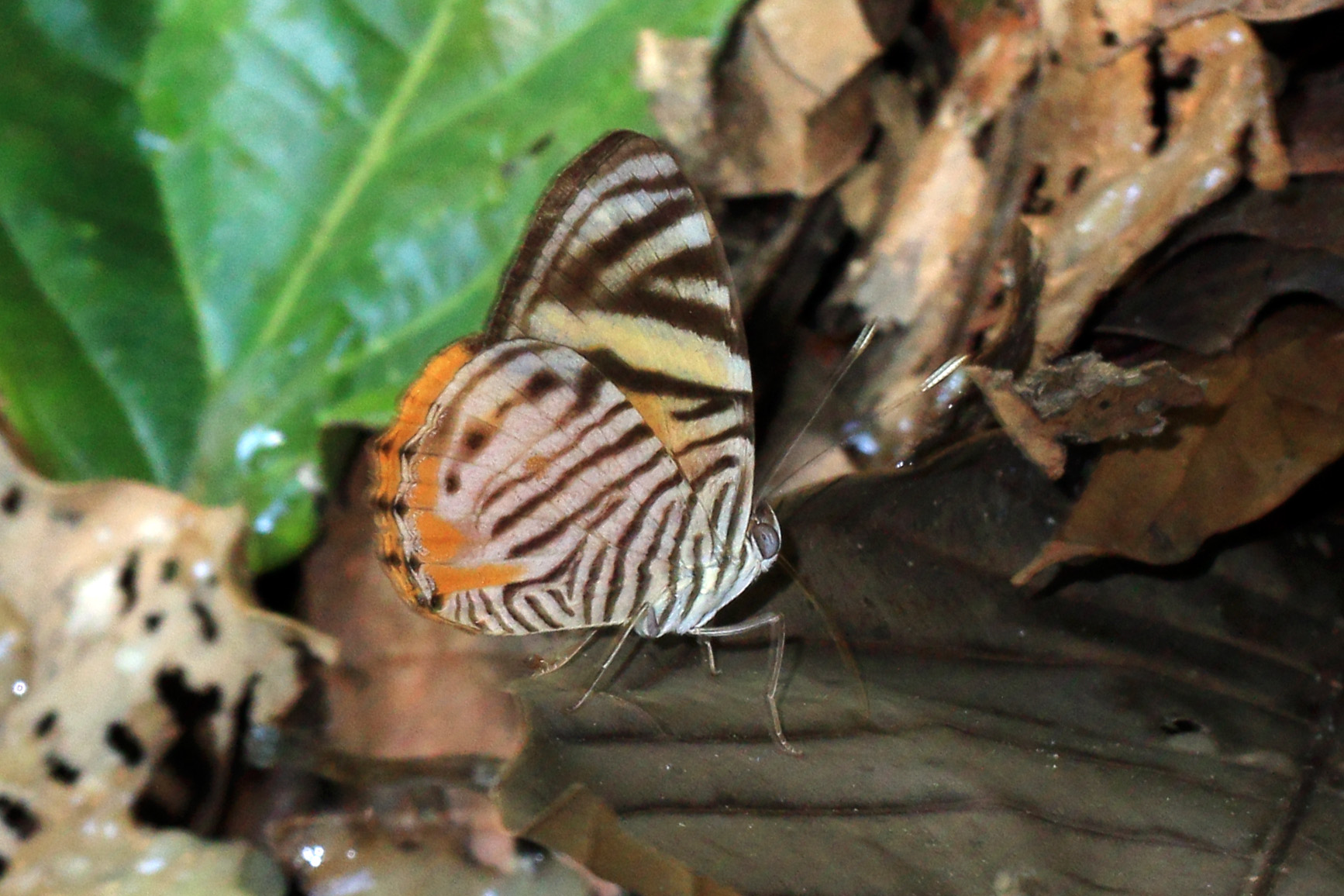
- Tigridia acesta tapajona, Brazil

Scientific classification
- Kingdom: Animalia
- Phylum: Arthropoda
- Class: Insecta
- Order: Lepidoptera
- Family: Nymphalidae
- Subfamily: Nymphalinae
- Tribe: Nymphalini
- Genus: Tigridia; Hübner, 1819
- Species: T. acesta

Binomial name
- Tigridia acesta (Linnaeus, 1758)

Synonyms
- Papilio acesta Linnaeus, 1758

= Tigridia acesta =

Species of butterfly

Tigridia acesta, the tiger beauty, is a butterfly of the monotypic genus Tigridia in the family Nymphalidae found from Mexico to South America.

It is sometimes placed in the tribe Coeini and sometimes in the tribe Nymphalini.

== Subspecies ==
- Tigridia acesta acesta (Linnaeus, 1758) (Mexico)
- Tigridia acesta columbina (Neustetter, 1929) (Colombia)
- Tigridia acesta fulvescens (Butler, 1873) (Peru, Ecuador)
- Tigridia acesta latifascia (Butler, 1873) (Colombia)
- Tigridia acesta ochracea (Bryk, 1953) (Peru)
- Tigridia acesta tapajona (Butler, 1873) (Brazil)
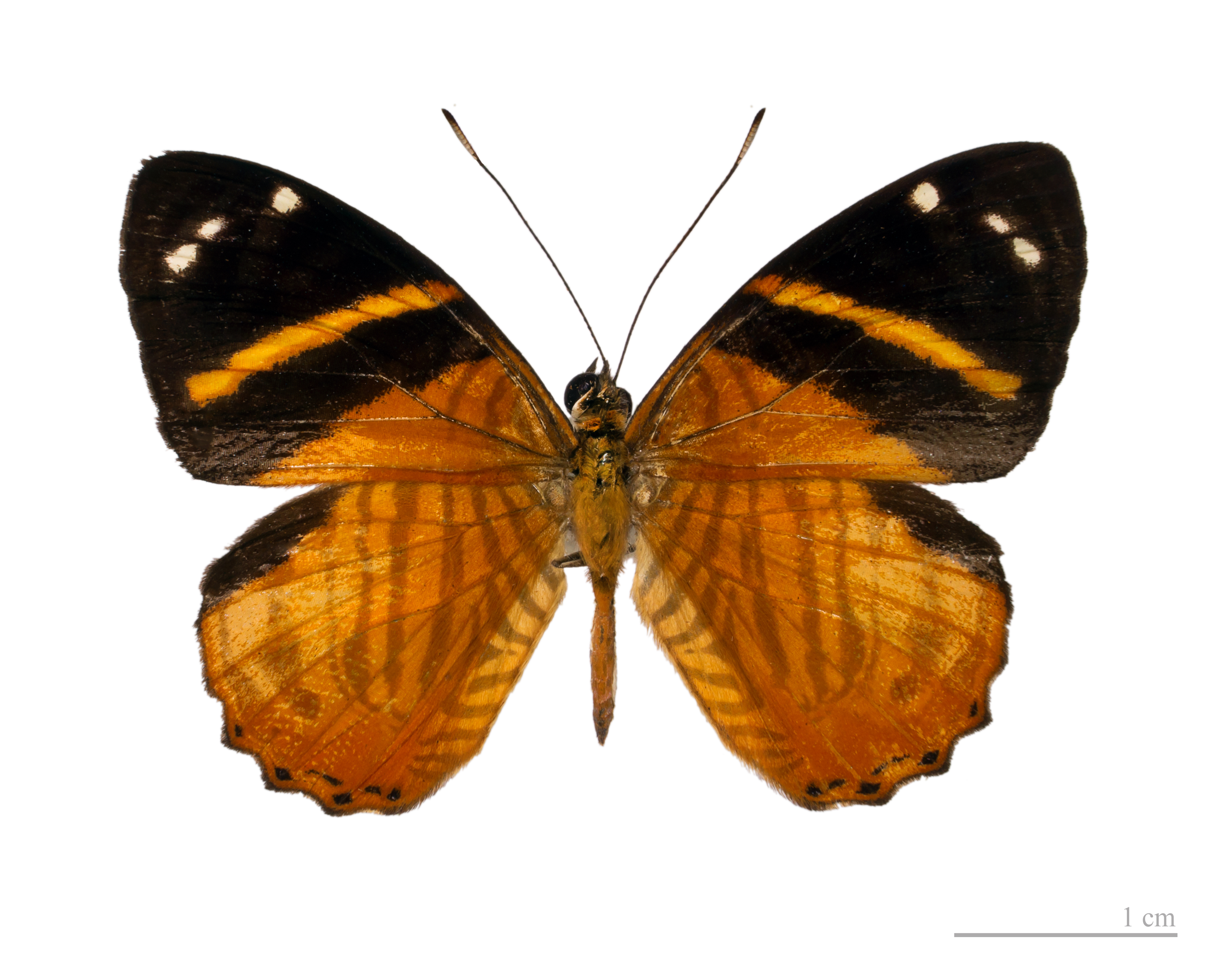
Male - MHNT

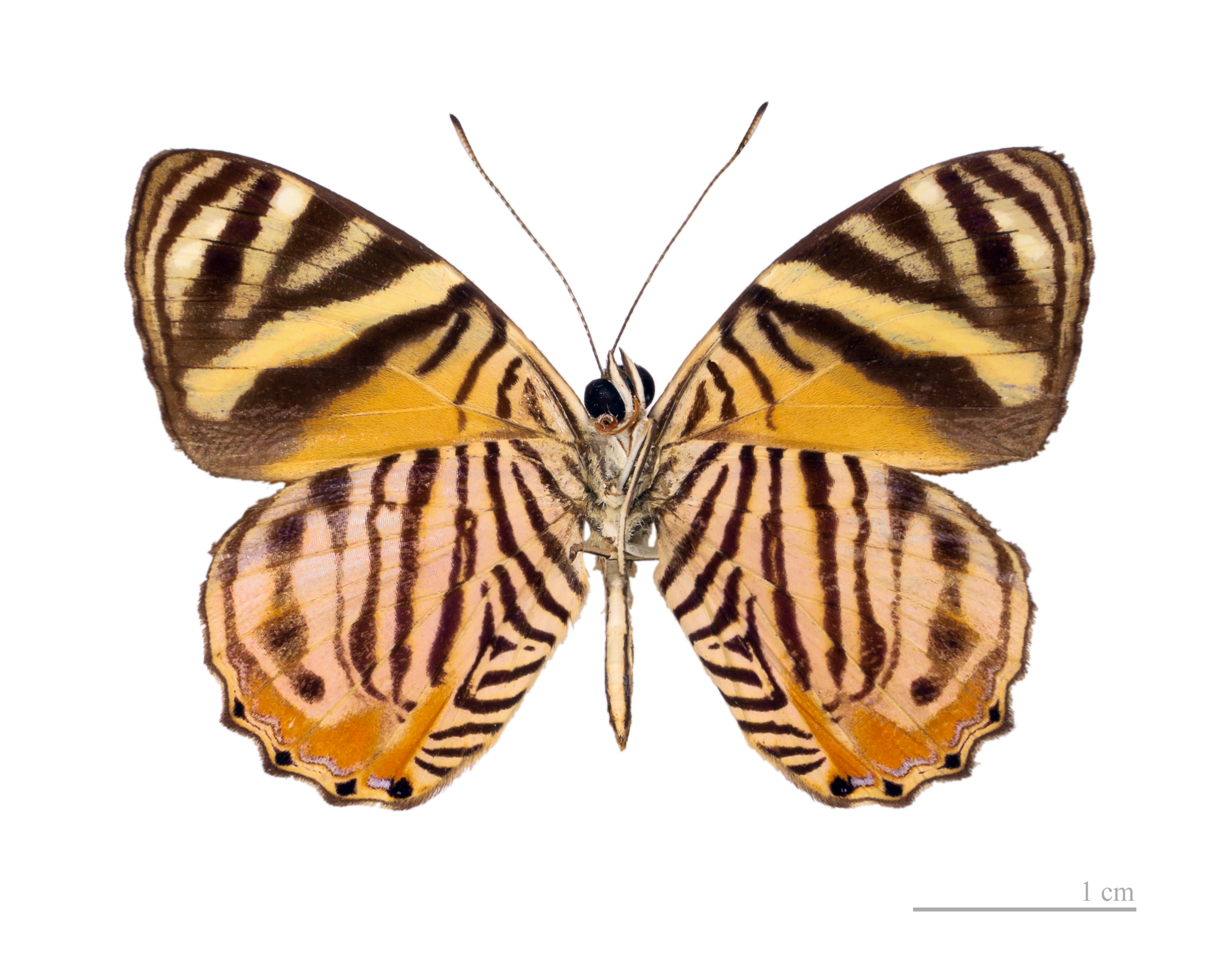
Male underside - MHNT
