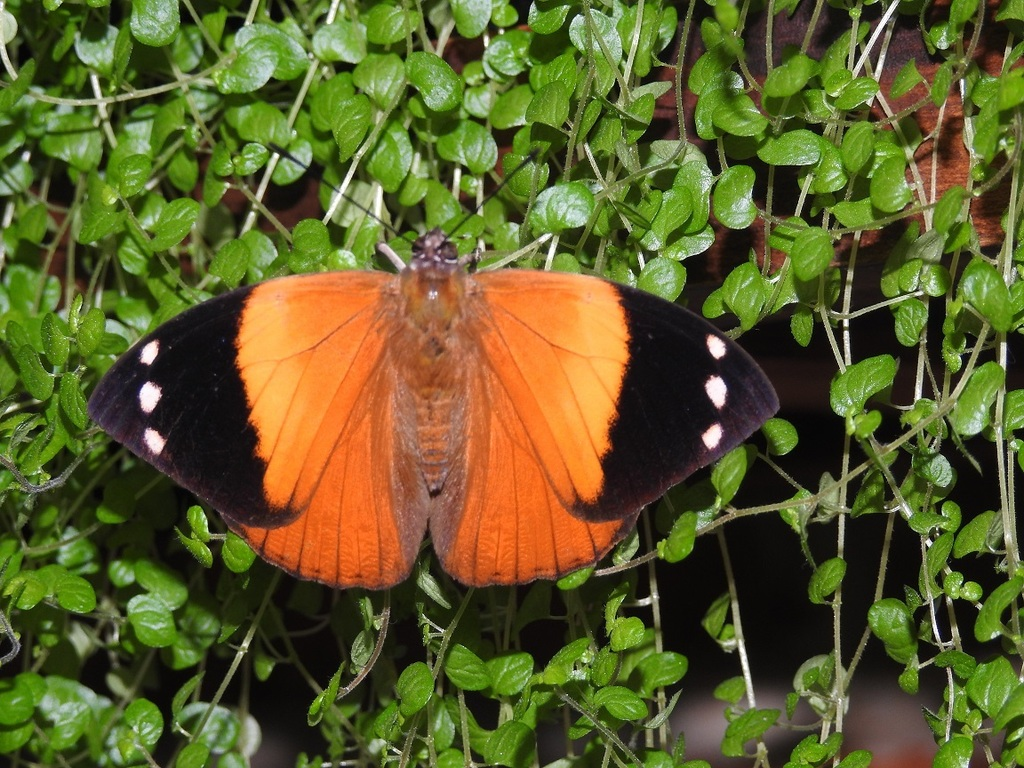

Scientific classification
- Kingdom: Animalia
- Phylum: Arthropoda
- Clade: Pancrustacea
- Class: Insecta
- Order: Lepidoptera
- Family: Nymphalidae
- Genus: Smyrna
- Species: S. karwinskii

Binomial name
- Smyrna karwinskii Geyer, 1833

= Smyrna karwinskii =

Species of butterfly

Smyrna karwinskii, or Karwinski's beauty, is a species of butterfly in the family Nymphalidae.
