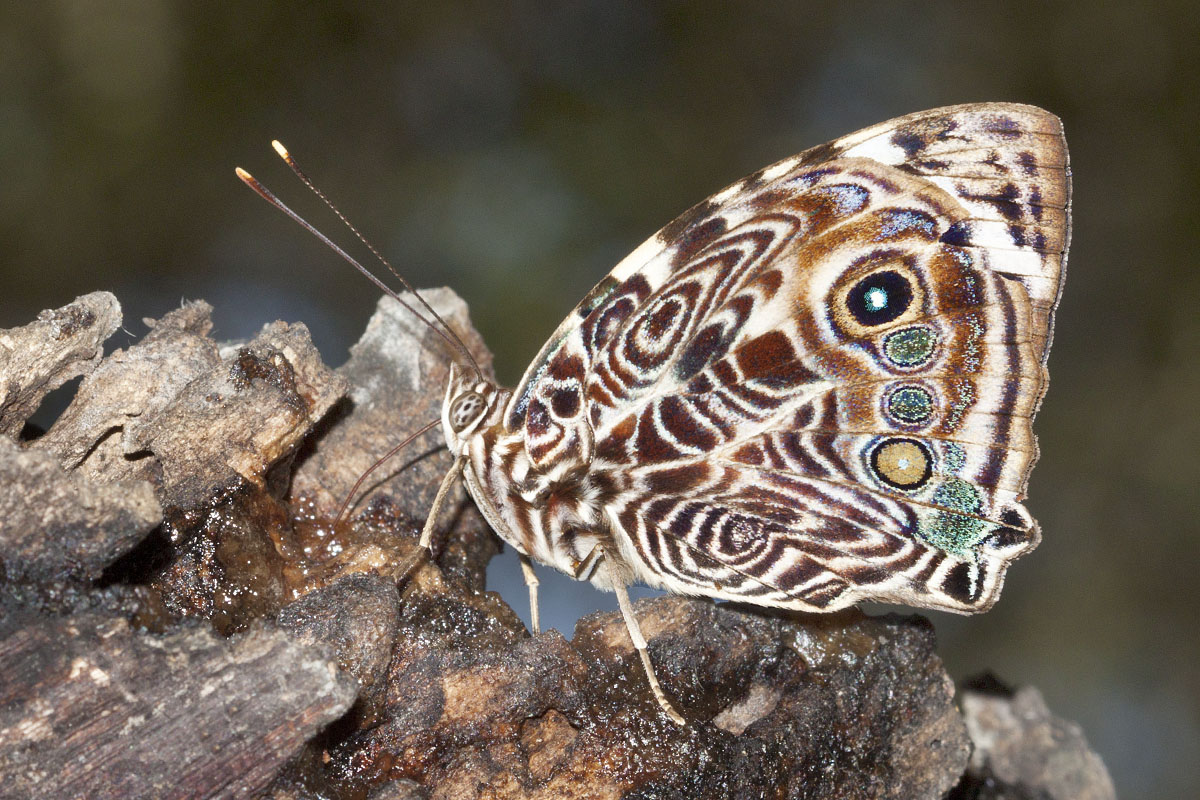

Scientific classification
- Domain: Eukaryota
- Kingdom: Animalia
- Phylum: Arthropoda
- Class: Insecta
- Order: Lepidoptera
- Family: Nymphalidae
- Genus: Smyrna
- Species: S. blomfildia

Binomial name
- Smyrna blomfildia (Fabricius, 1781)

Synonyms
- Papilio blomfildia Fabricius, 1781; Papilio proserpina Fabricius, 1793; Satyrus pluto Westwood, 1851

= Smyrna blomfildia =

Species of butterfly

Smyrna blomfildia, the Blomfild's beauty, is a species of butterfly in the family Nymphalidae.

== Subspecies ==
- Smyrna blomfildia blomfildia Fabricius, 1793 (Brazil)
- Smyrna blomfildia datis Fruhstorfer, 1908 (Mexico to Panama)

== Distribution and habitat ==
Blomfild's beauty can be found from south Texas and Mexico to Peru through Central America. These butterflies live in tropical forests at an elevation of 0–1,200 metres (0–3,937 ft) above sea level.

== Description ==
Smyrna blomfildia has a wingspan of about 75–90 millimetres (3.0–3.5 in). The basic color of the wings is red orange in males, brown in females. The upperside of the forewings show a black apex with three white spots. The underside of hindwings has brown and tan wavy markings with a few submarginal spots.

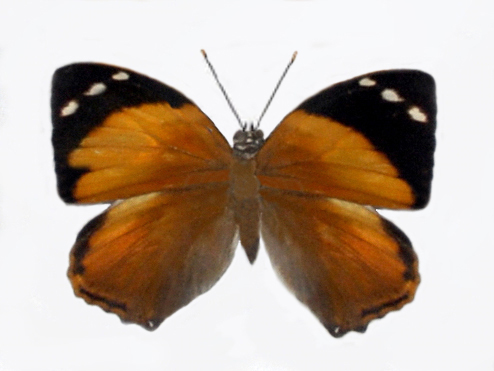
Smyrna blomfildia. Mounted specimen, upperside

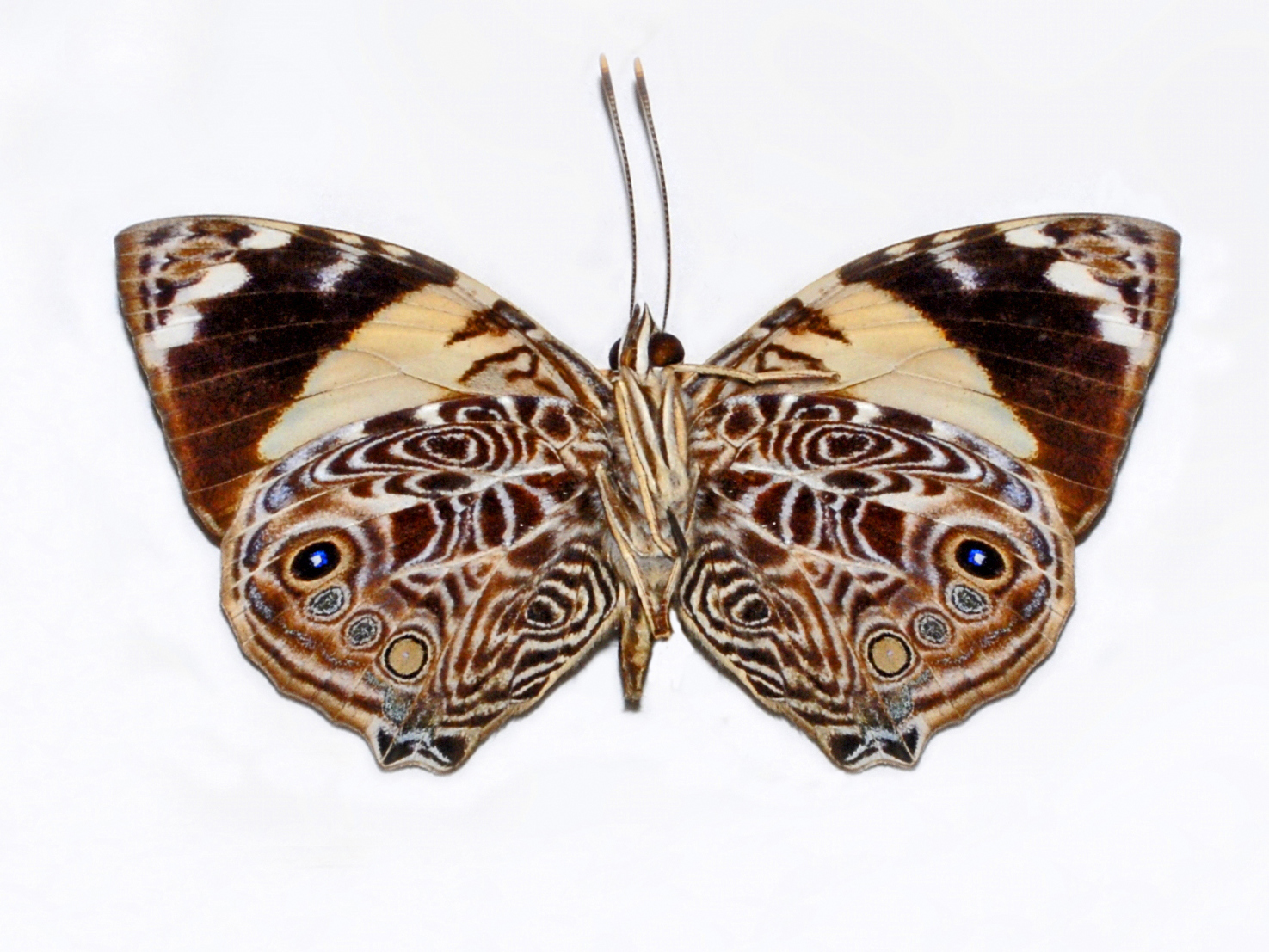
Underside

== Biology ==
The larvae are black, with a bright orange head and strong spines along the white sides. They feed on Urticaceae (Urticastrum, Urrera baccifera), while adults feed on rotting fruits. Males of these butterflies are usually seen in large aggregations imbibing mineralized moisture.

The female Smyrna blomfildia will lay its eggs all throughout the plant. This offspring will eventually build frass chains that serve as their resting spot.
