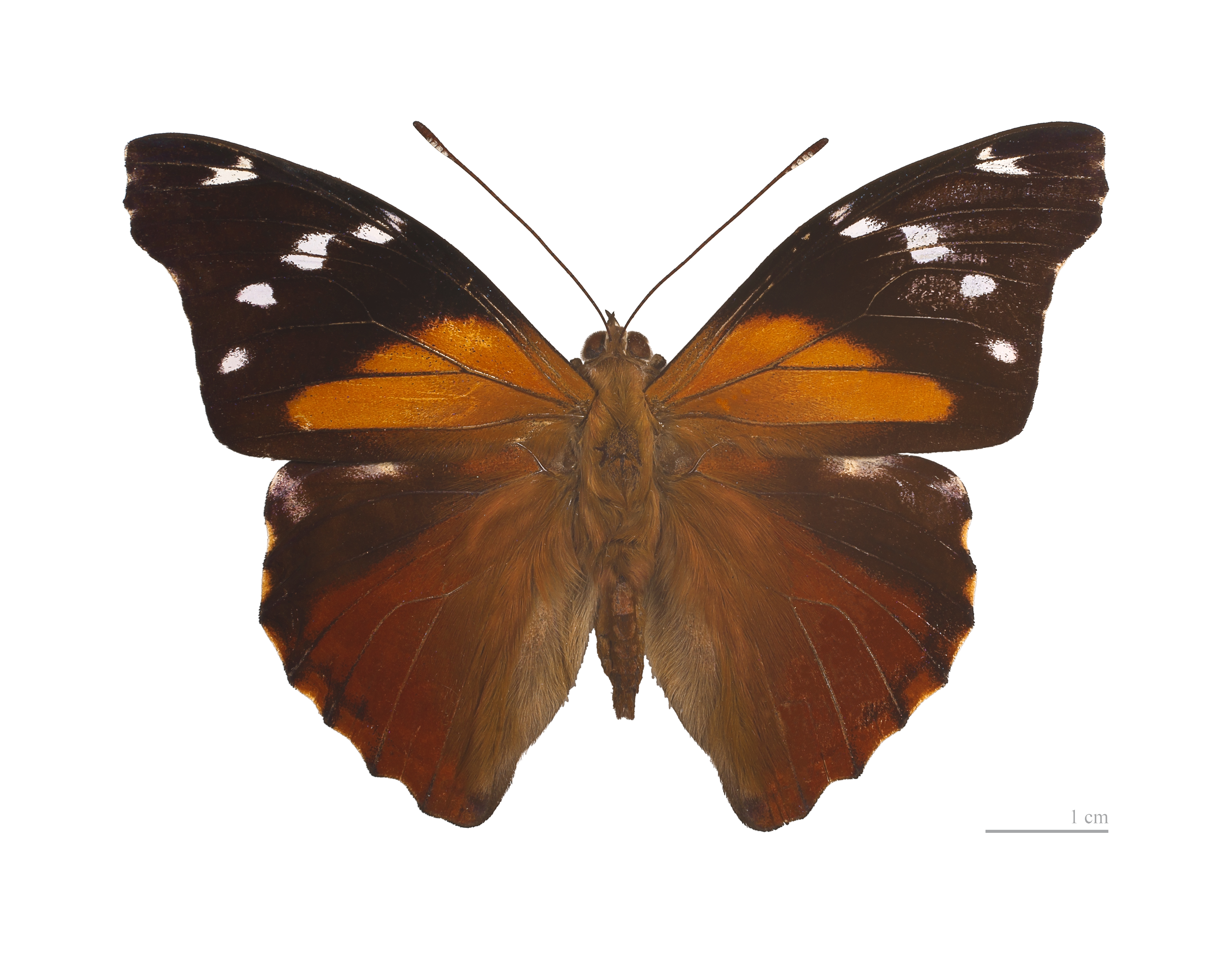
- Pycina zamba - male - Peru
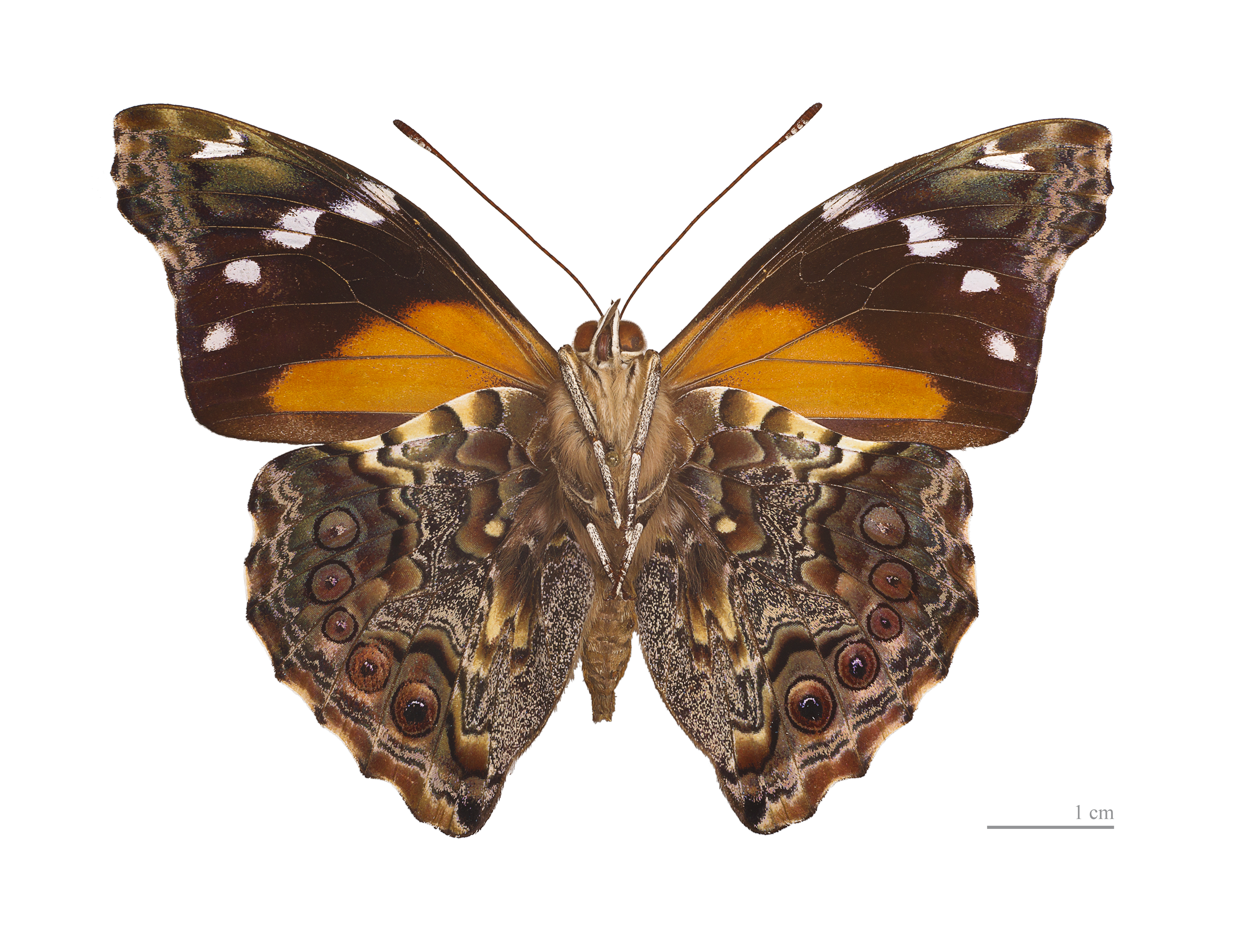
- Pycina zamba - male underside - Peru

Scientific classification
- Domain: Eukaryota
- Kingdom: Animalia
- Phylum: Arthropoda
- Class: Insecta
- Order: Lepidoptera
- Family: Nymphalidae
- Tribe: Coeini
- Genus: Pycina; Doubleday, 1849

= Pycina =

Genus of butterflies

Pycina is a genus of butterflies in the family Nymphalidae found from Mexico to South America.

== Species ==
There are two recognised species:

- Pycina zamba Doubleday, 1849
- Pycina zelys Godman & Salvin, 1884
