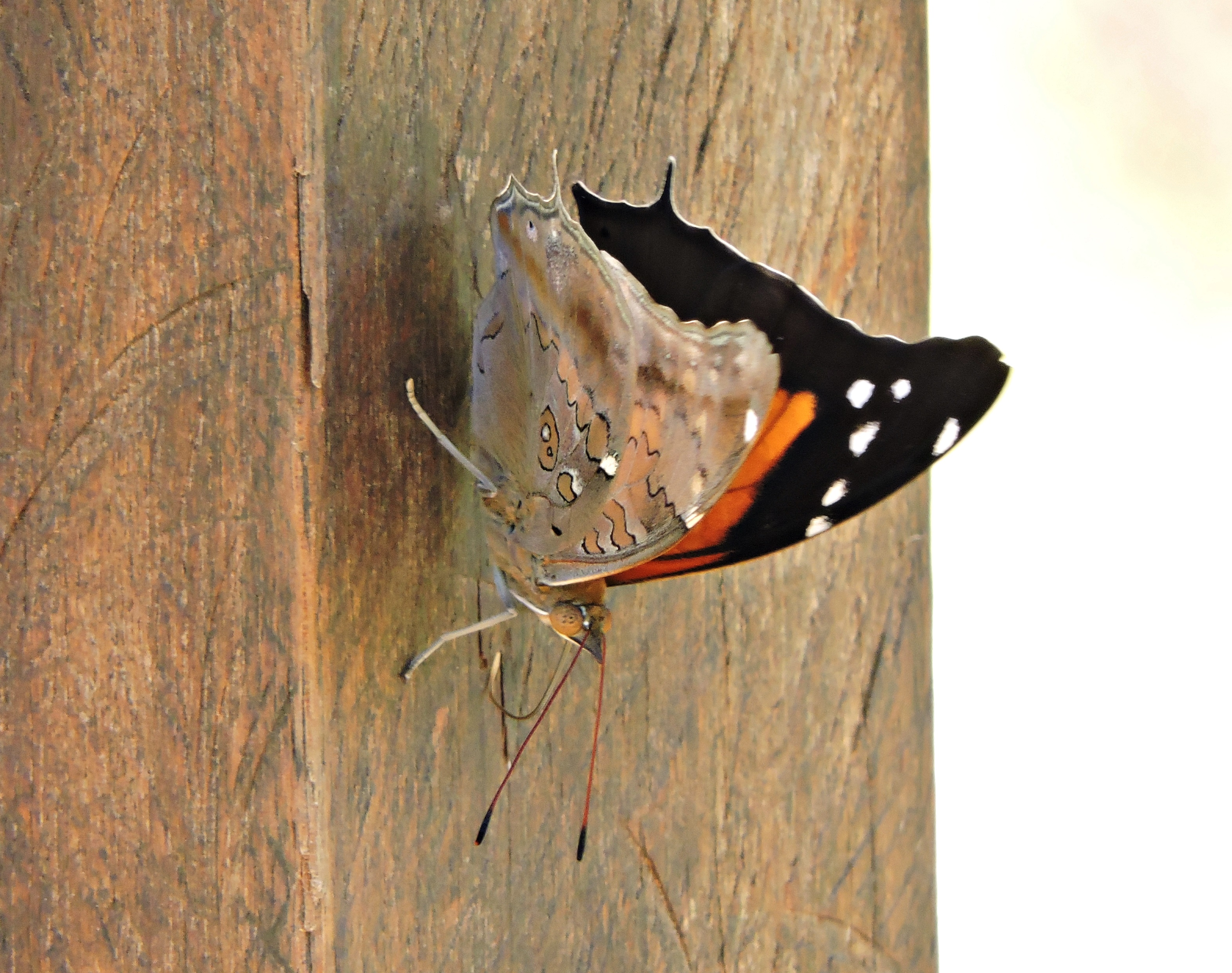

Scientific classification
- Kingdom: Animalia
- Phylum: Arthropoda
- Clade: Pancrustacea
- Class: Insecta
- Order: Lepidoptera
- Family: Nymphalidae
- Genus: Historis
- Species: H. acheronta

Binomial name
- Historis acheronta (Fabricius, 1775)

= Historis acheronta =

Species of butterfly

Historis acheronta, the tailed cecropian, is a species of butterfly in the family Nymphalidae.

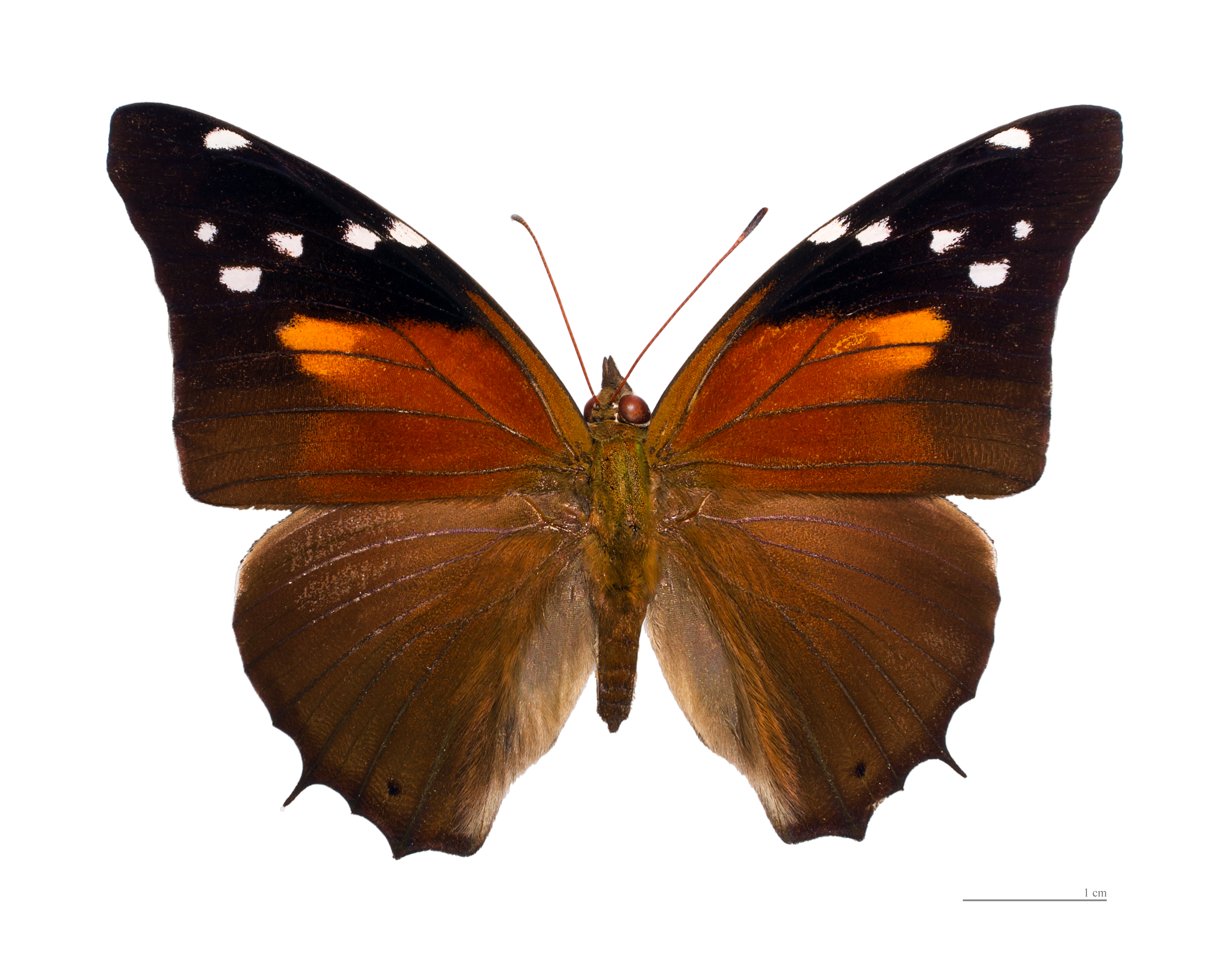
Tailed cecropian, Historis acheronta

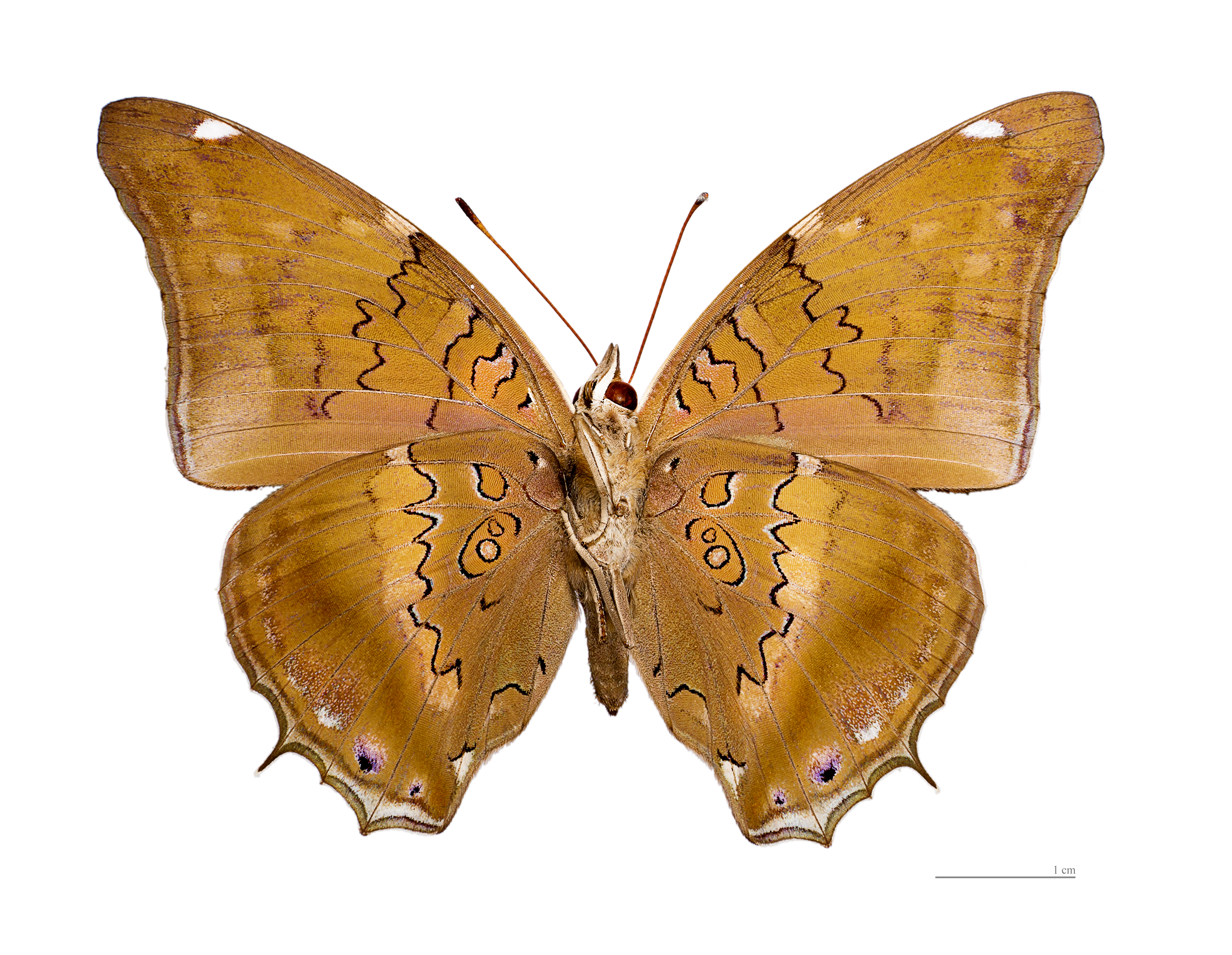
Tailed cecropian, Historis acheronta
