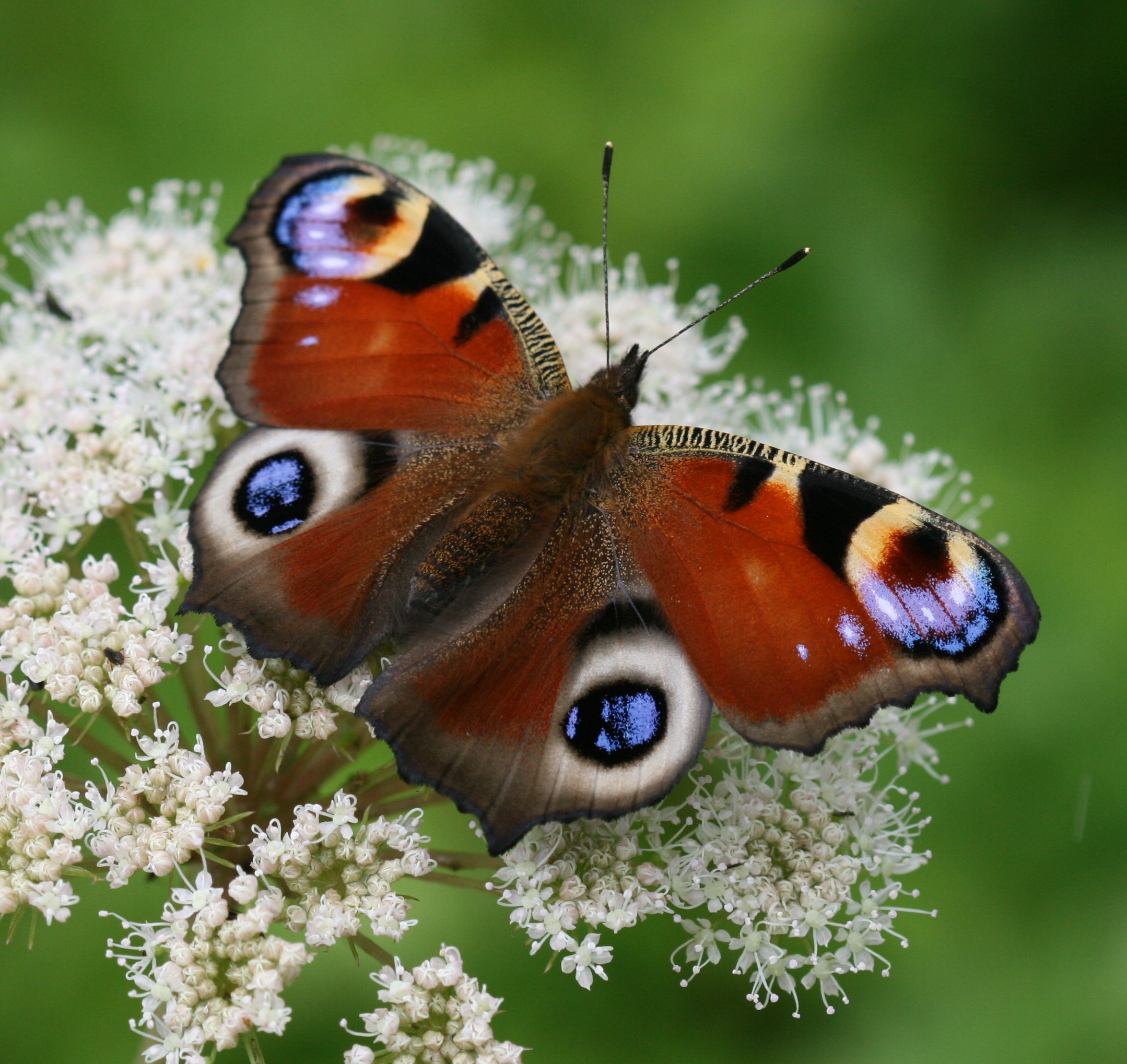
- Aglais io

Scientific classification
- Domain: Eukaryota
- Kingdom: Animalia
- Phylum: Arthropoda
- Class: Insecta
- Order: Lepidoptera
- Family: Nymphalidae
- Subfamily: Nymphalinae
- Tribe: Nymphalini; Rafinesque, 1815

Genera
- Numerous, see text

= Nymphalini =

Tribe of butterflies

Nymphalini is a tribe of nymphalid brush-footed butterflies. Common names include admirals, anglewings, commas, and tortoiseshells, but none of these is specific to one particular genus.

The name anglewing butterflies is an English translation of a Latin term papiliones angulati, [Denis & Schiffermüller], ([1775, 1776]). Based on an overall similarity in the angulate wing shape, a collective name: Papiliones angulati was employed for Papilio atalanta, P. antiopa, P. cardui, P. c-album, P. io, P. polychloros, P. urticae, P. xanthomelas, P. vaualbum, P. levana and P. prorsa. The term papiliones angulati is applied as a collective taxon name, which therefore needs no type species as specified in Article 42.3.1 of the International Code of Zoological Nomenclature. Papiliones angulati has thus been re-defined to apply only to a clade: Nymphalis sensu lato, and to specifically exclude Papilio atalanta [→ Vanessa], P. cardui [→ Cynthia], P. levana, and P. prorsa [→ Araschnia].

This monophyletic group of nymphaline butterflies inhabiting the Northern Hemisphere are characterized by a jagged outline of their wings and the ability to survive the winter months as adults in an obligatory hibernal diapause, hiding in various shelters (e.g., crevices, hollows, cavities, even unheated buildings). The signature mark of all butterflies is the cryptic colour and maculation (spots) of the ventral (under) side of their wings, serving to conceal the hibernating butterfly against the substrate on which it rests.

== Genera ==
Listed alphabetically:

- Aglais Dalman, 1816 – tortoiseshells
- Antanartia Rothschild & Jordan, 1903 – African red admirals
- Araschnia Hübner, 1819
- Hypanartia Hübner, 1821 – mapwings
- Inachis – European peacock (now in Aglais)
- Kaniska Moore, 1899 – blue admiral (often in Polygonia)
- Mynes Boisduval, 1832
- Nymphalis Kluk, 1781 – anglewings, tortoiseshells
- Polygonia Hübner, 1819 – anglewings, commas
- Symbrenthia Hübner, 1819 – jesters
- Vanessa Fabricius, 1807 – red admirals, Kamehameha butterflies, painted ladies

The monotypic genus Tigridia is sometimes placed here as a very basal offshoot close to Colobura, sometimes in the related tribe Coeini.

Prehistoric genera only known from fossils are:

- †Jupitella Carpenter, 1985
- †Mylothrites Scudder, 1875
