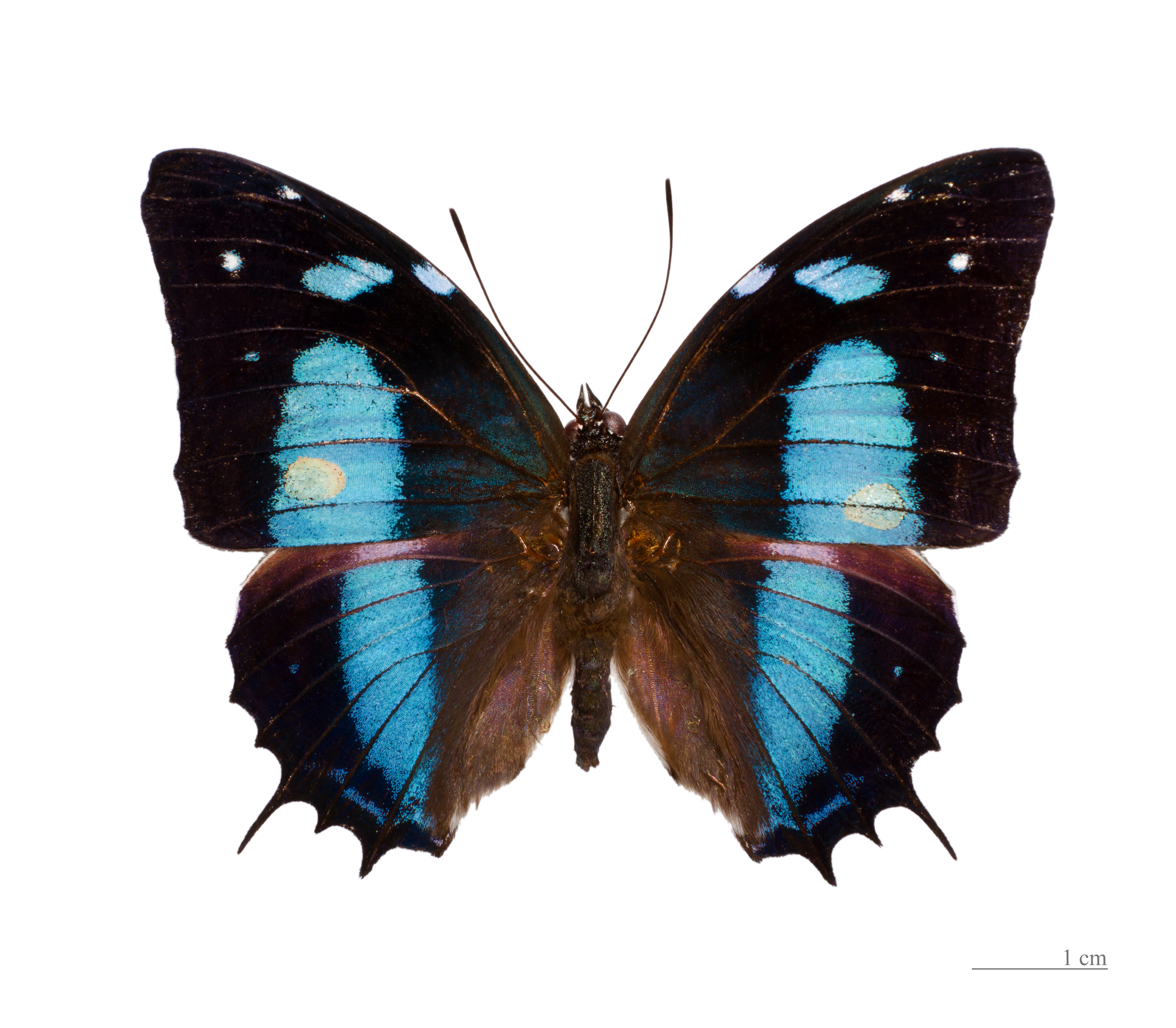
- Dorsal view - MHNT
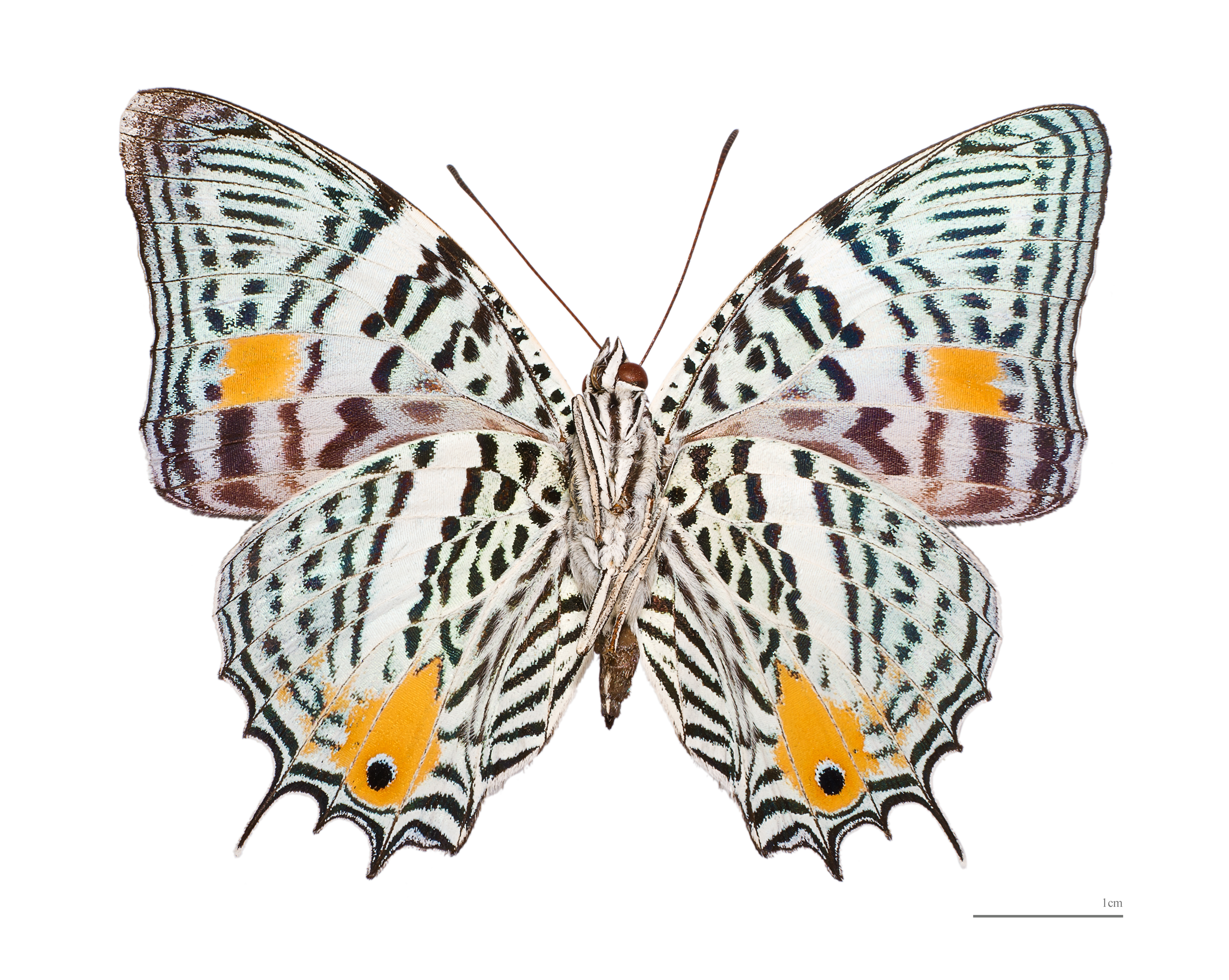
- Ventral view - same specimen

Scientific classification
- Domain: Eukaryota
- Kingdom: Animalia
- Phylum: Arthropoda
- Class: Insecta
- Order: Lepidoptera
- Family: Nymphalidae
- Genus: Baeotus
- Species: B. aeilus

Binomial name
- Baeotus aeilus (Stoll, 1780)

Synonyms
- Papilio aeilus Stoll, 1780; Eriboea aile Hübner, [1819]; Megistanis amazonicus Riley, 1919; Baeotus amazonicus

= Baeotus aeilus =

Species of butterfly

Baeotus aeilus, the Amazon beauty, is a species of butterfly of the family Nymphalidae. It is found in the upper Amazon areas of Brazil, Ecuador and Peru.

The wingspan is about 75 mm. Adults are sexually dimorphic.

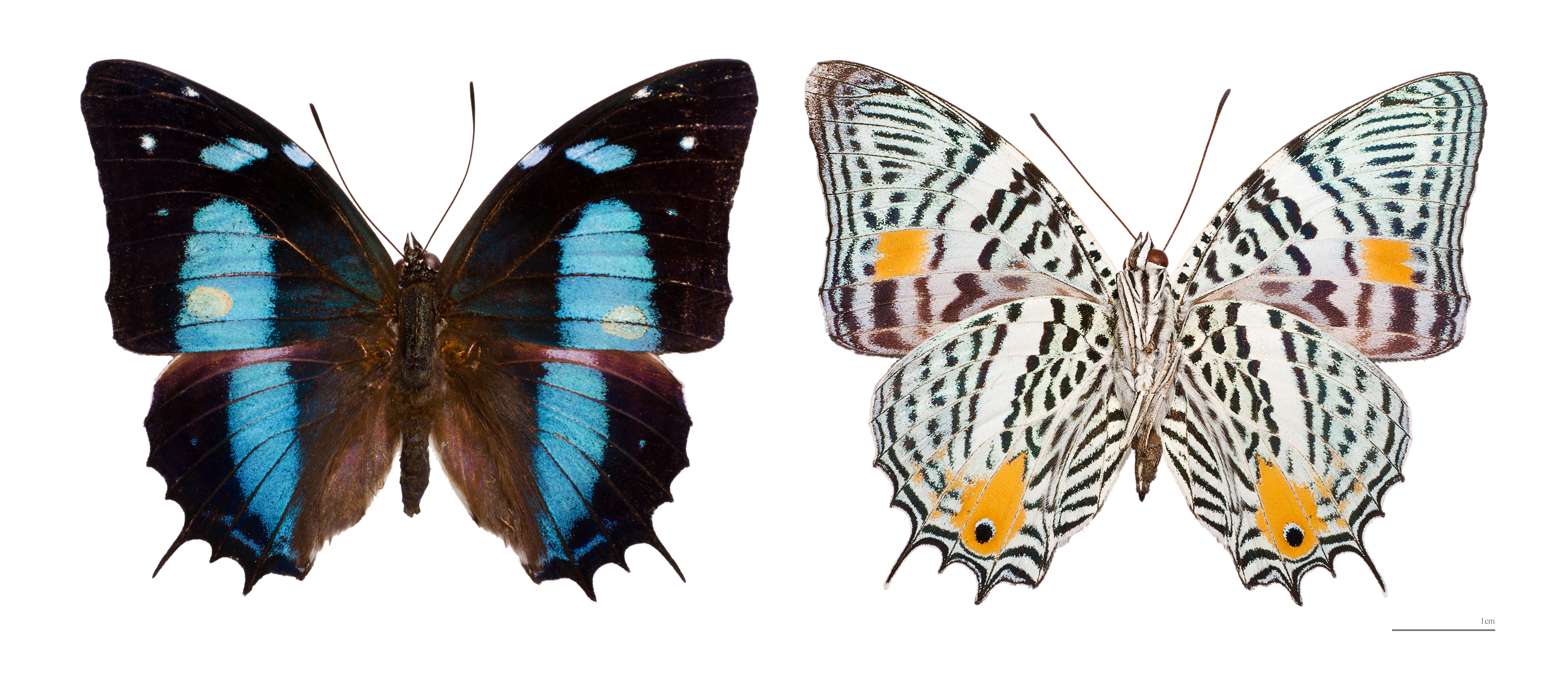
Dorsal and ventral views

== Taxonomy ==
This species was formerly known as Baeotus amazonicus.
