= List of butterflies of Georgia (U.S. state) =

This is a list of butterflies native to the U.S state of Georgia.

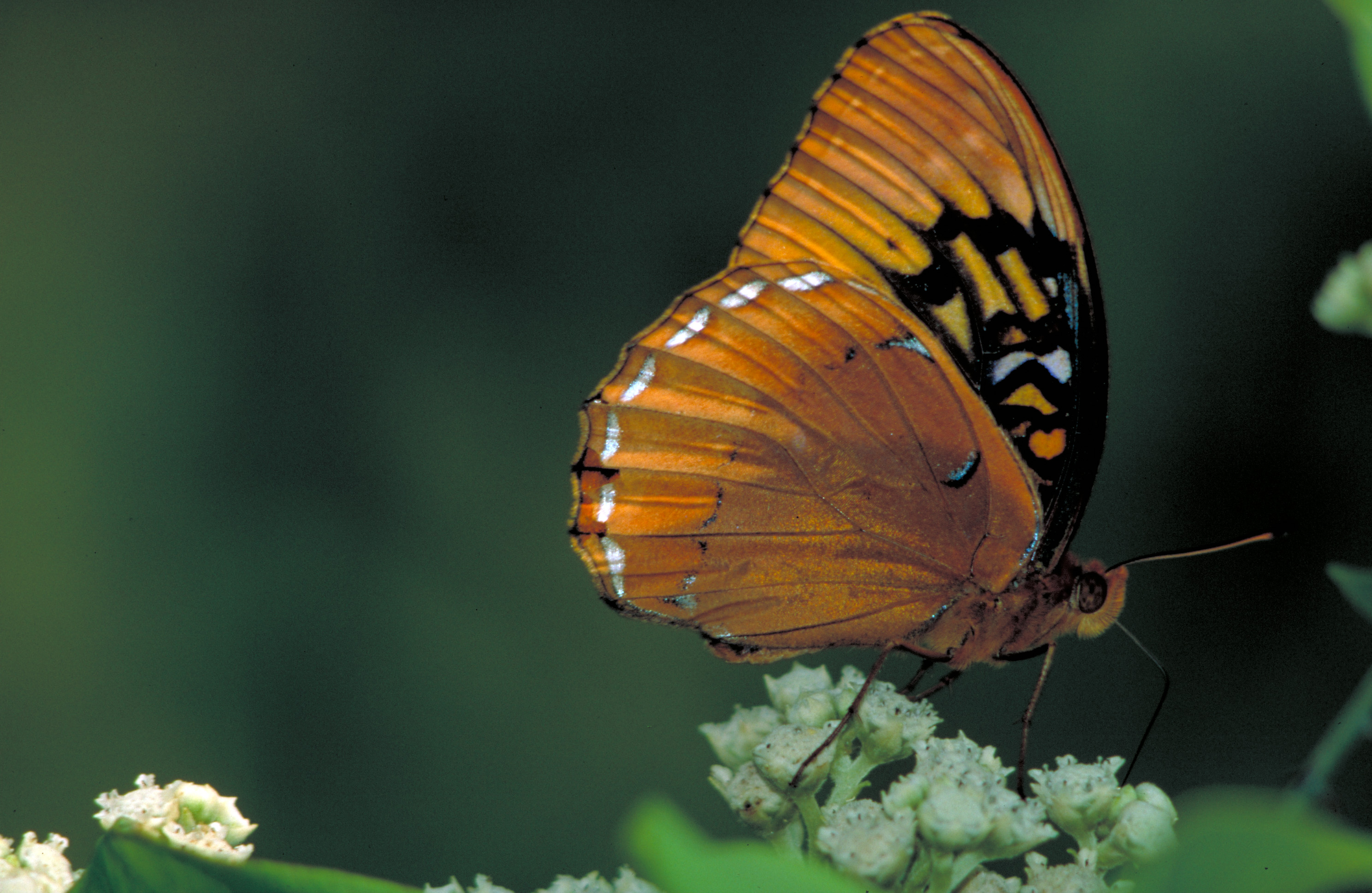
Diana fritillary, G2 - imperiled

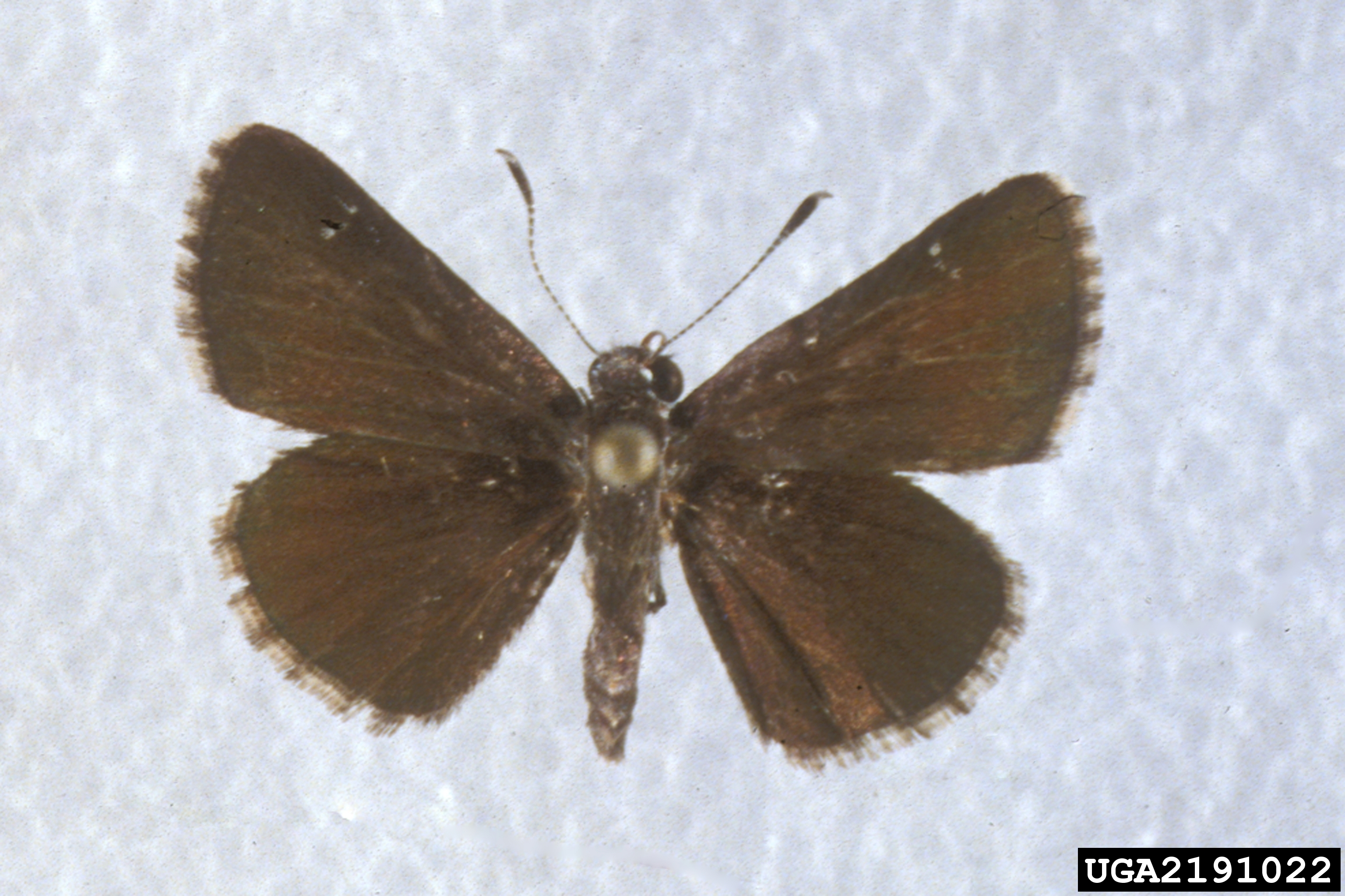
Dusky roadside skipper, G2 - imperiled

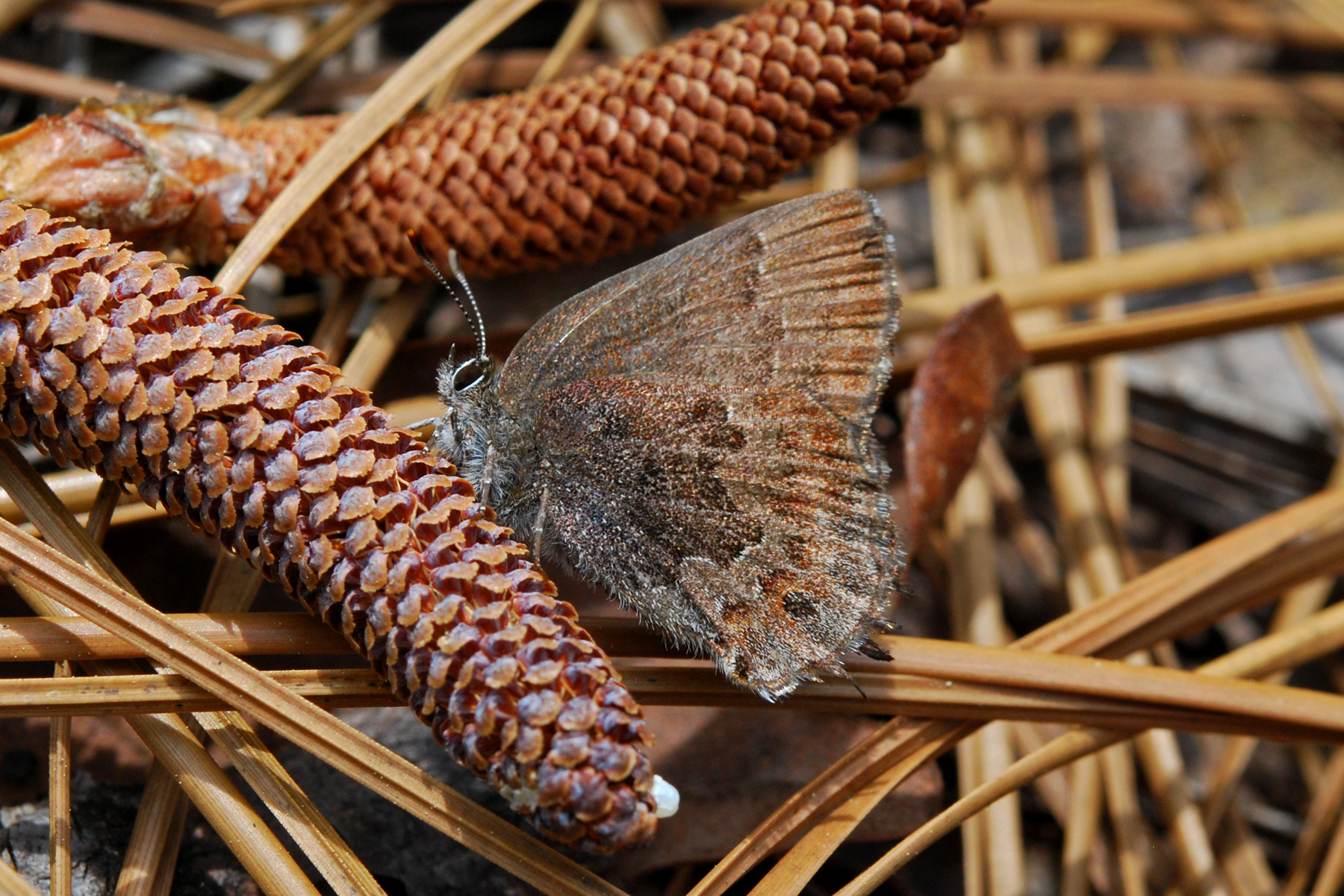
Frosted elfin, G2 - imperiled

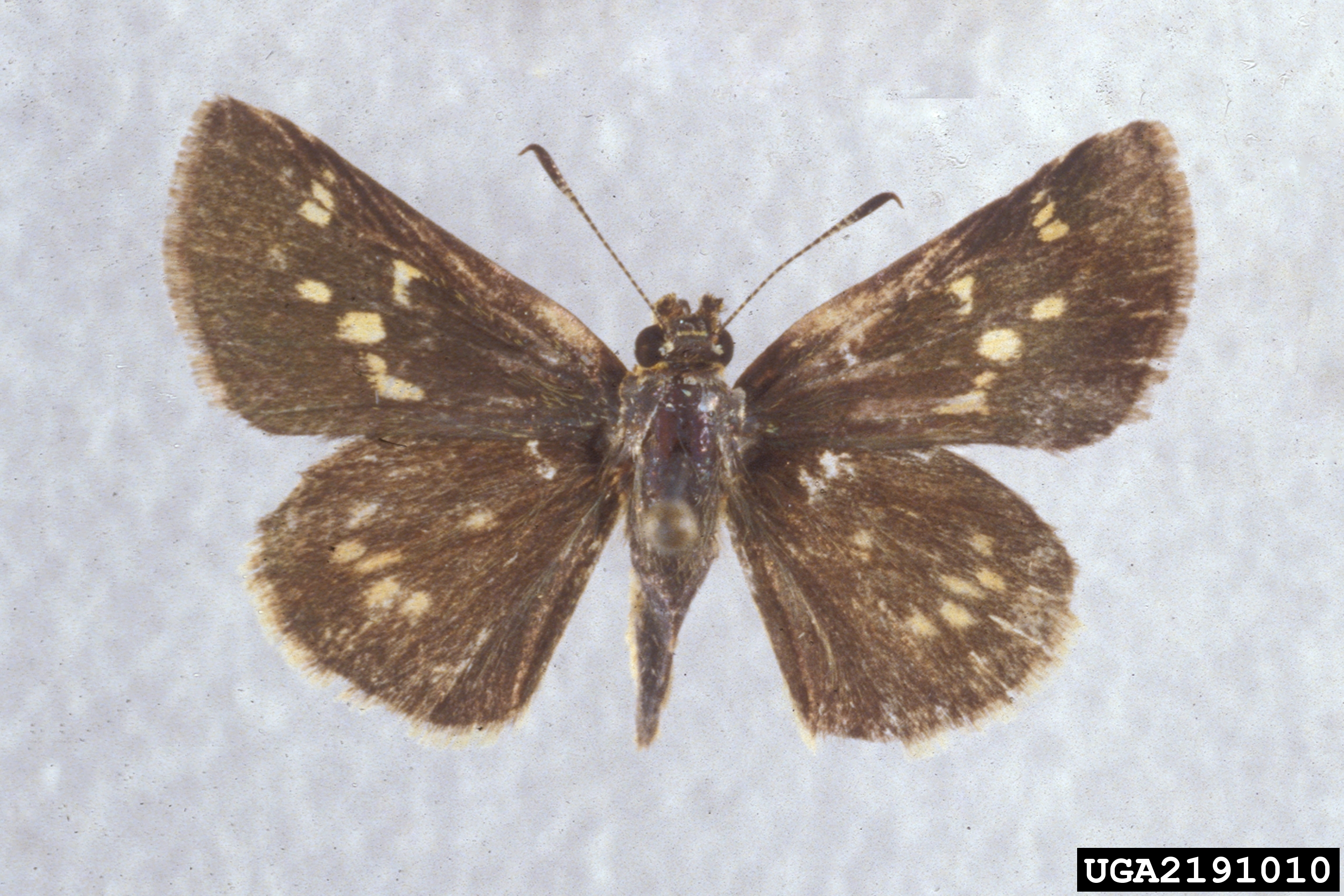
Carolina roadside skipper, G3 - vulnerable

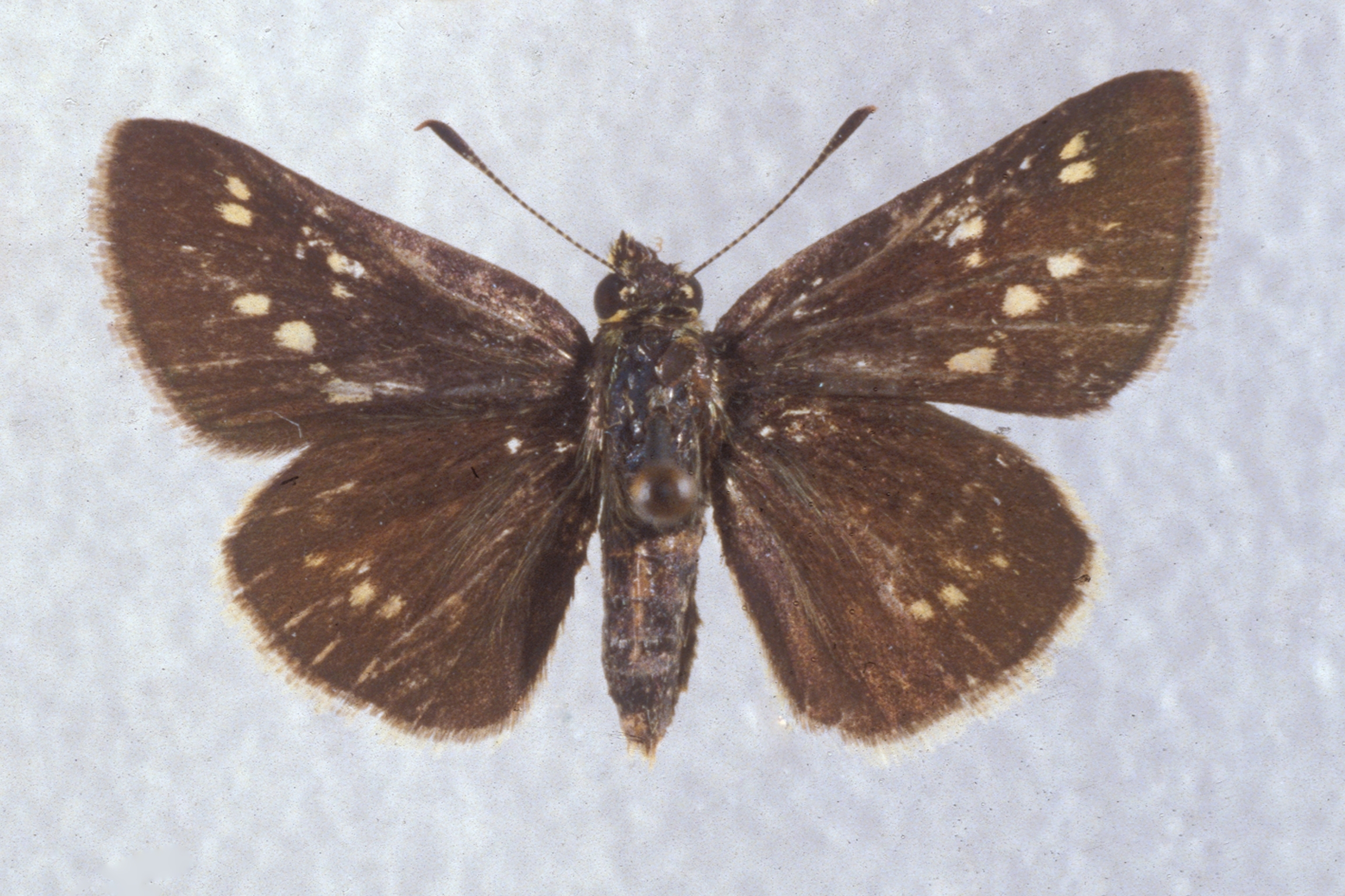
Reversed roadside skipper, G3 - vulnerable

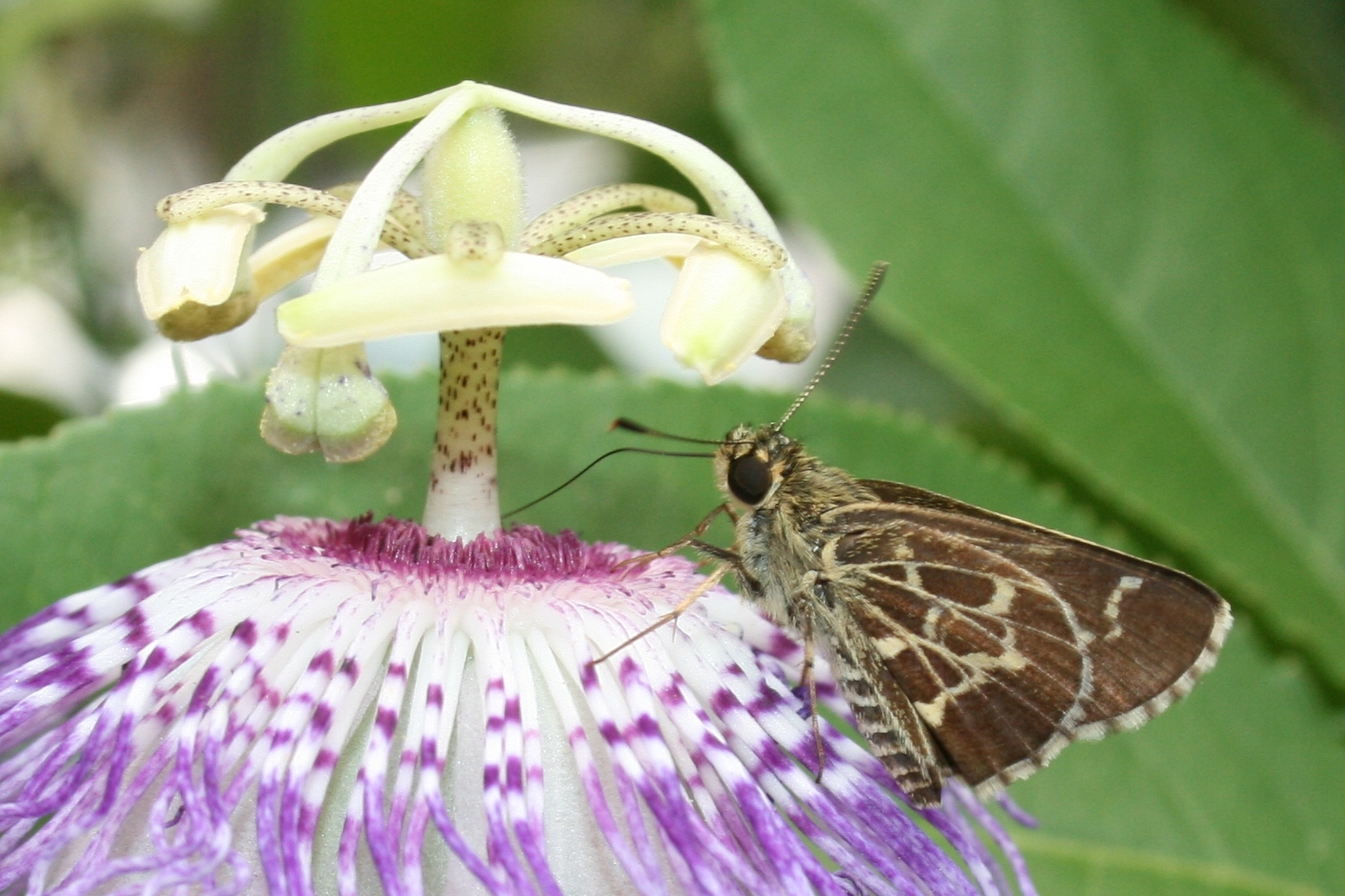
Lace-winged roadside skipper, G3 - vulnerable

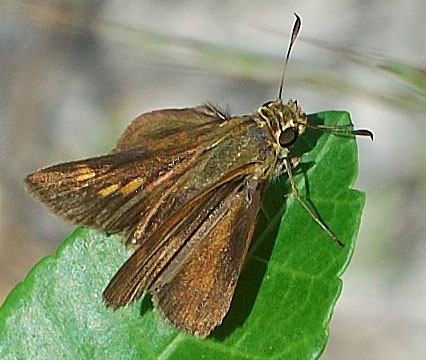
Palmetto skipper, G3 - vulnerable

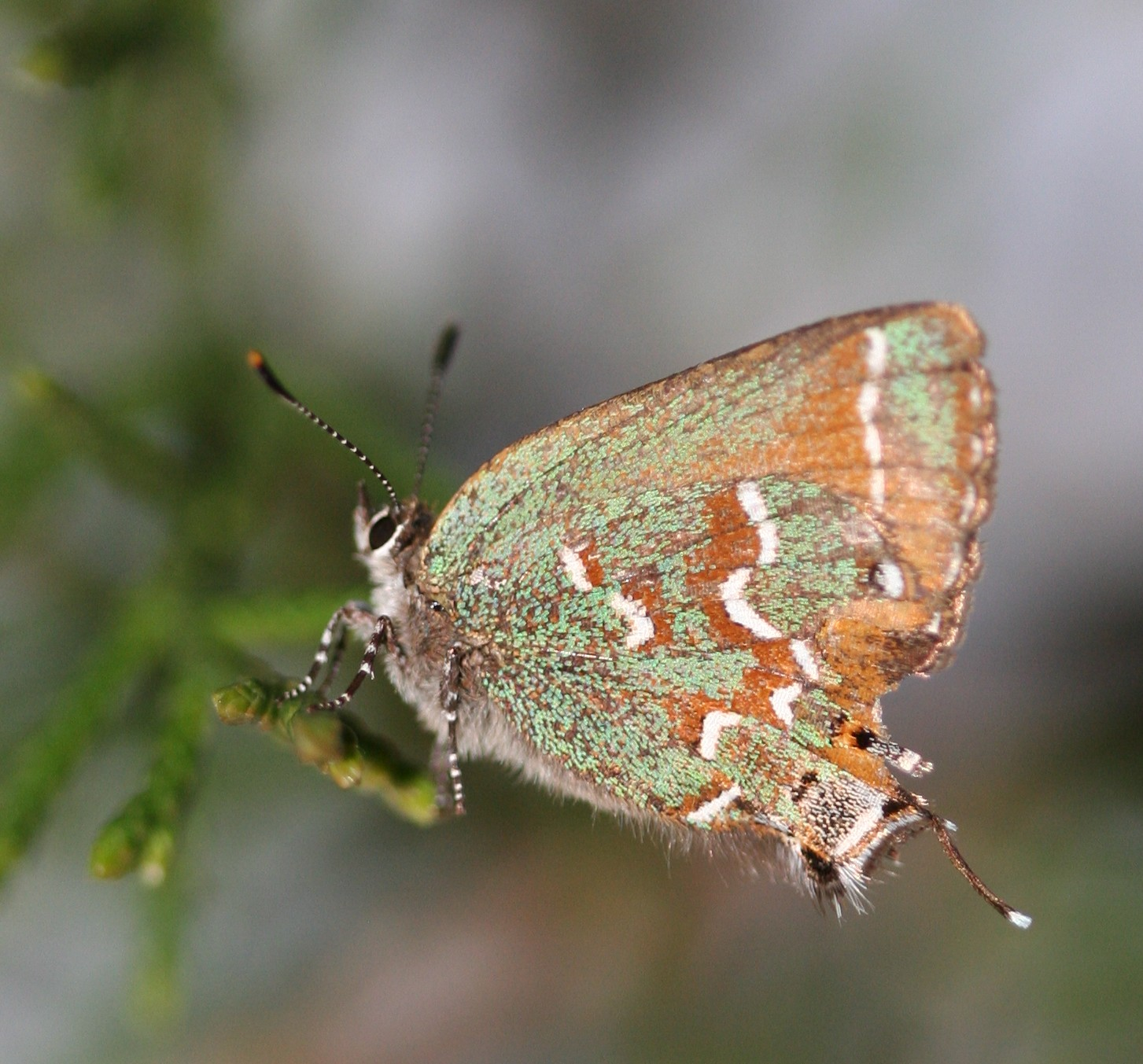
Juniper hairstreak, G2 - imperiled

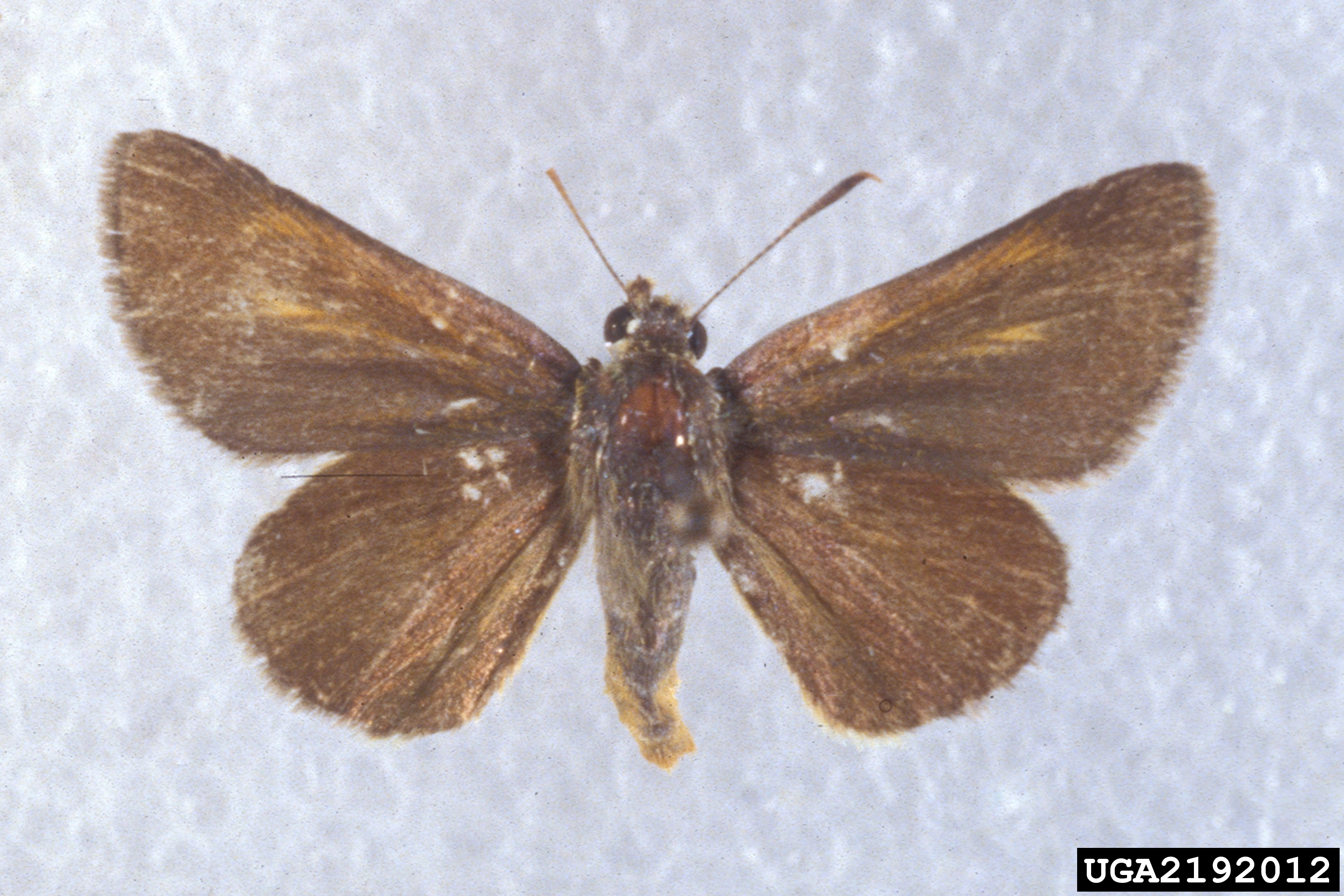
Arogos skipper, G2 - imperiled

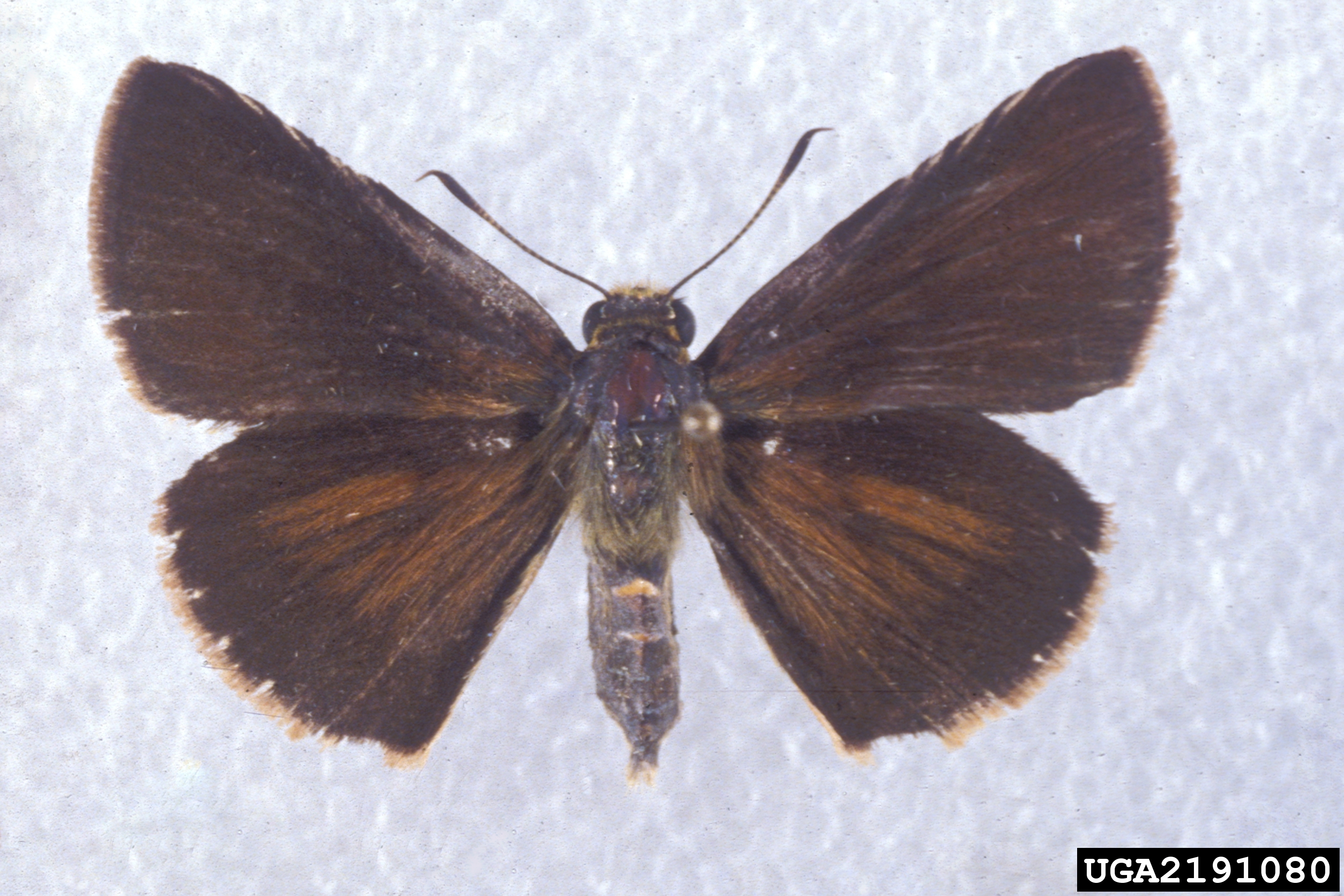
Dukes' skipper, G3 - vulnerable

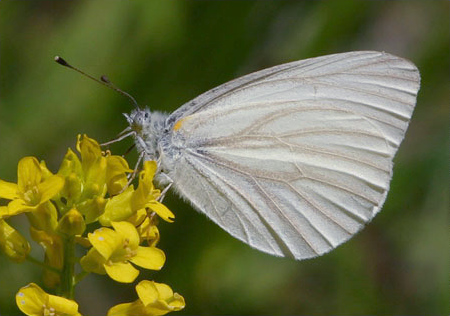
West Virginia white, G2 - imperiled

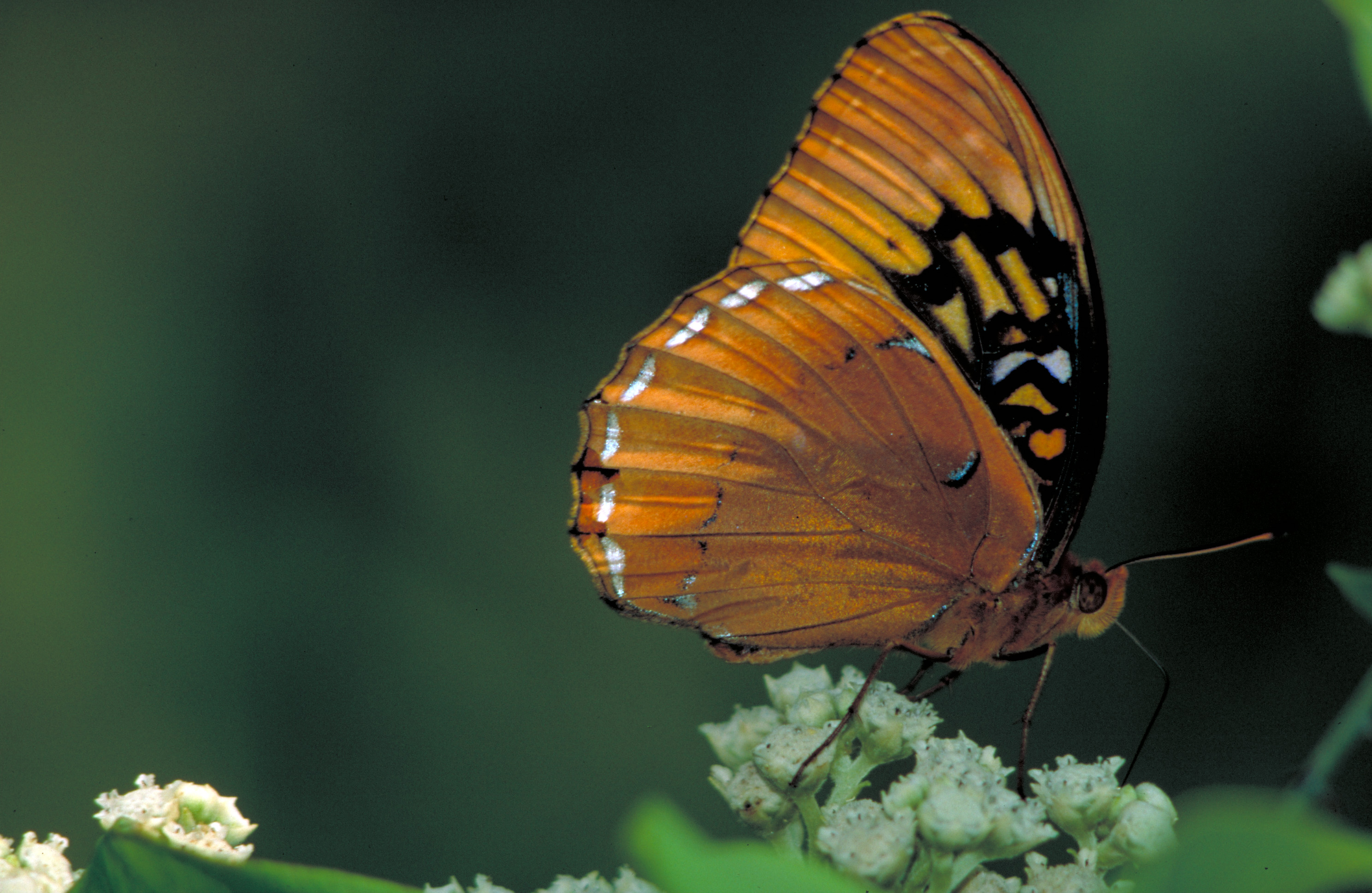
Diana fritillary, G2 - imperiled

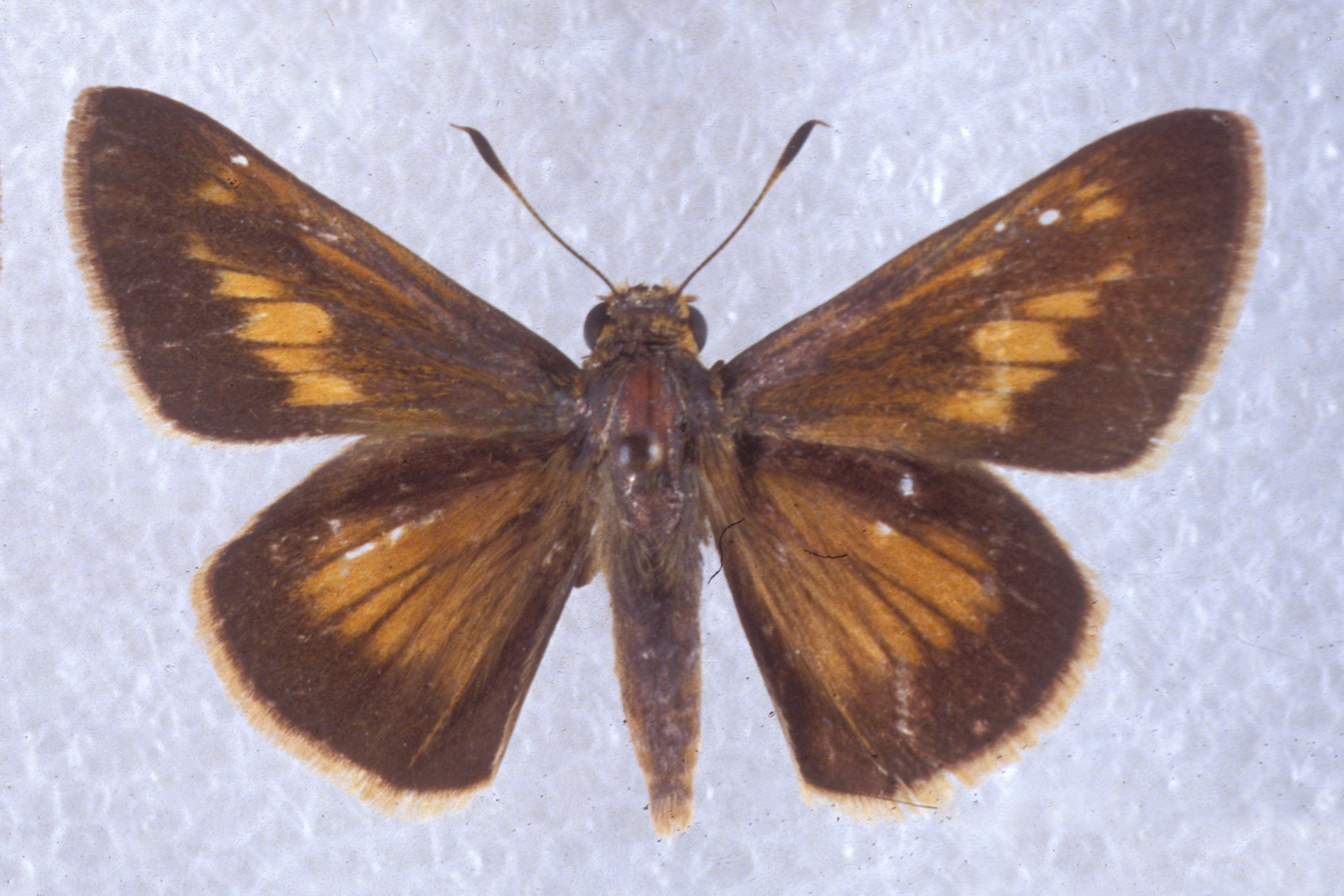
Palatka skipper, G3 - vulnerable

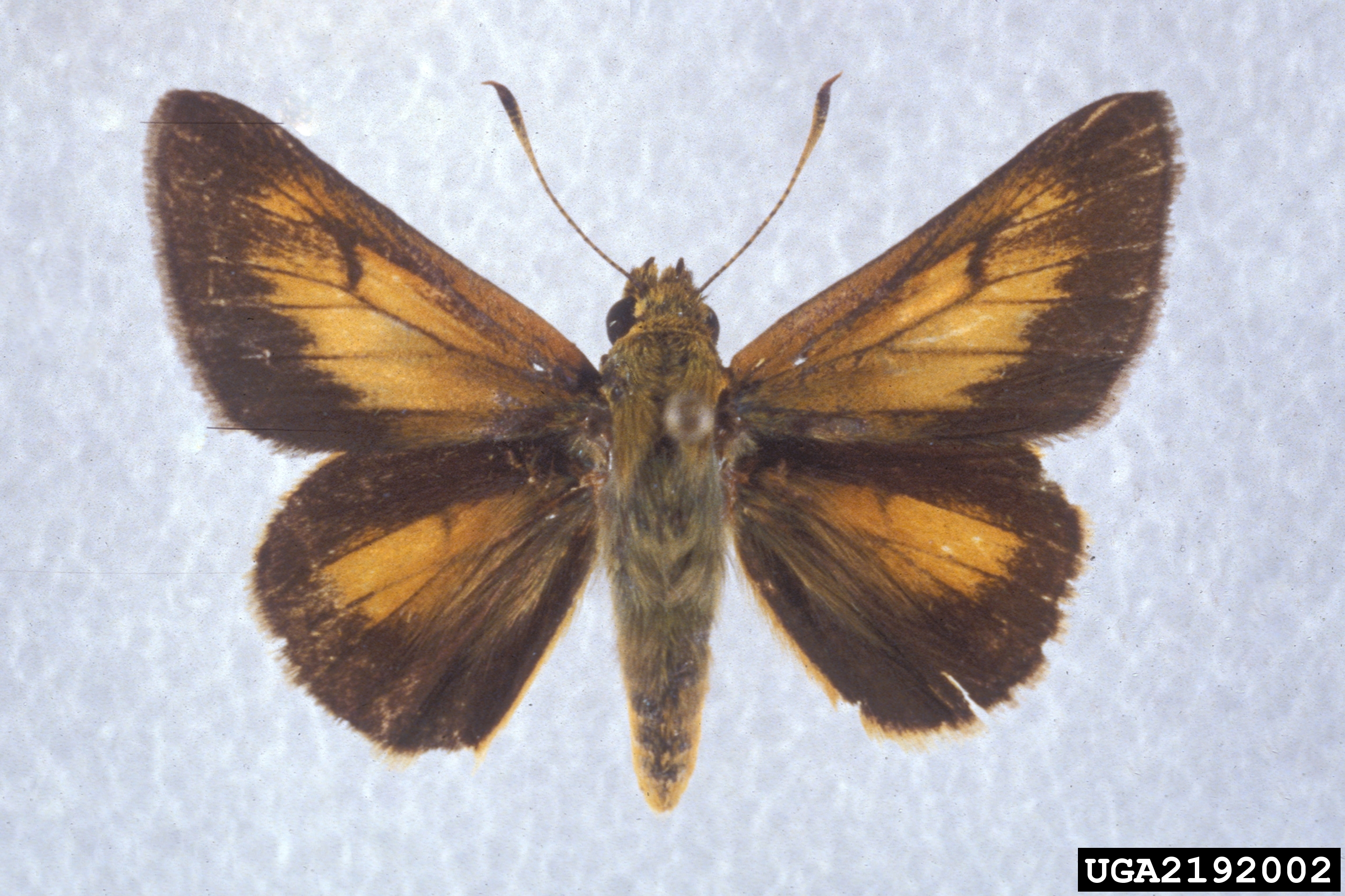
Rare skipper, G3 - vulnerable

Family	Scientific name	Common names	Range within Georgia	Conservation status
Hesperiidae	Pholisora catullus	Common sootywing	Resident throughout Georgia	G5 - secure
Lycaenidae	Atlides halesus	Great purple hairstreak	Resident throughout Georgia	G4 - apparently secure
Nymphalidae	Anthanassa texana	Texan crescent	Resident along the coast and southern border with Florida	G5 - secure
Nymphalidae	Vanessa atalanta	Red admiral	Resident in coastal plain, visitor in Piedmont and mountains	G5 - secure
Nymphalidae	Euphydryas phaeton	Baltimore checkerspot	Resident in northern mountains	G4 - apparently secure
Nymphalidae	Heliconius charithonia	Zebra longwing	Visitor in coastal plain	G5 - secure
Nymphalidae	Limenitis arthemis astyanax	Red-spotted purple, white admiral	Subspecies L. arthemis astyanax is resident statewide	T5 - secure subspecies
Papilionidae	Protographium marcellus	Zebra swallowtail	Resident statewide	G5 - secure
Papilionidae	Papilio polyxenes	Black swallowtail	Resident statewide	G5 - secure
Papilionidae	Battus philenor	Pipevine swallowtail	Resident statewide	G5 - secure
Nymphalidae	Nymphalis antiopa	Mourning cloak	Resident in mountains, Piedmont, and coastal plain. Visitor in lower coastal plain	G5 - secure
Nymphalidae	Speyeria diana	Diana fritillary	Resident in mountains and upper Piedmont	G2 - imperiled
Papilionidae	Papilio troilus	Spicebush swallowtail	Resident statewide	G5 - secure
Papilionidae	Papilio glaucus	Eastern tiger swallowtail	Resident statewide	G5 - secure
Papilionidae	Papilio palamedes	Palamedes swallowtail	Resident in coastal plain, stray in Piedmont and mountains.	G4 - apparently secure
Papilionidae	Battus polydamas	Polydamas swallowtail	Stray statewide	G5 - secure
Lycaenidae	Leptotes cassius	Cassius blue	Stray in lower coastal plain	G5 - secure
Lycaenidae	Hemiargus ceraunus	Ceraunus blue	Stray in Piedmont and coastal plain	G5 - secure
Lycaenidae	Everes comyntas	Eastern tailed-blue	Resident statewide	G5 - secure
Lycaenidae	Celastrina ladon	Spring azure	Resident statewide	G4 - apparently secure
Lycaenidae	Celastrina neglecta	Summer azure	Resident statewide	G5 - secure
Lycaenidae	Glaucopsyche lygdamus	Silvery blue	Resident in Mountains and upper Piedmont	G5 - secure
Lycaenidae	Celastrina neglectamajor	Appalachian azure	Resident in north Georgia	G4 - apparently secure
Lycaenidae	Parrhasius m-album	White M hairstreak	Resident statewide	G5 - secure
Lycaenidae	Atlides halesus	Great purple hairstreak	Resident stat-wide	G4 - apparently secure
Lycaenidae	Brephidium isophthalma	Eastern pygmy-blue	Resident along the coast	G4 - apparently secure
Lycaenidae	Everes comyntas	Eastern tailed-blue	Resident statewide	G5 - secure
Hesperiidae	Amblyscirtes alternata	Dusky roadside skipper	Resident in lower Piedmont and coastal plain	G2 - imperiled
Lycaenidae	Callophrys augustinus	Brown elfin	Resident in Mountains and upper Piedmont	G5 - secure
Lycaenidae	Callophrys irus	Frosted elfin	Resident statewide	G2 - imperiled
Hesperiidae	Polites baracoa	Baracoa skipper	Extreme south Georgia	G5 - secure
Hesperiidae	Nastra lherminier	Swarthy skipper	Resident statewide	G5 - secure
Hesperiidae	Polites themistocles	Tawny-edged skipper	Resident statewide	G5 - secure
Lycaenidae	Callophrys niphon	Eastern pine elfin	Resident statewide	G5 - secure
Lycaenidae	Callophrys henrici	Henry's elfin	Resident statewide	G5 - secure
Hesperiidae	Amblyscirtes hegon	Pepper-and-salt skipper	Resident in mountains and upper Piedmont	G5 - secure
Hesperiidae	Lerodea eufala	Eufala skipper	Resident in lower coastal plain, visitor in upper coastal plain and Piedmont	G5 - secure
Lycaenidae	Satyrium titus	Coral hairstreak	Resident in mountains and Piedmont	G5 - secure
Lycaenidae	Satyrium calanus	Banded hairstreak	Resident statewide	G5 - secure
Lycaenidae	Satyrium edwardsii	Edwards' hairstreak	Resident in mountains, Piedmont, and upper coastal plain	G4 - apparently secure
Lycaenidae	Satyrium caryaevorum	Hickory hairstreak	Resident in extreme north Georgia	G4 - apparently secure
Lycaenidae	Satyrium kingi	King's hairstreak	Resident in most of the state, excluding the far northwest and far southeast	G3 - vulnerable
Hesperiidae	Polites origenes	Crossline skipper	Resident statewide except extreme south Georgia.	G5 - secure
Hesperiidae	Polites peckius	Peck's skipper	Resident in extreme north Georgia	G5 - secure
Hesperiidae	Polites vibex	Whirlabout	Resident in coastal plains, visitor in Piedmont	G5 - secure
Lycaenidae	Fixsenia favonius	Southern hairstreak	Resident statewide	G4 - apparently secure
Lycaenidae	Satyrium liparops	Striped hairstreak	Resident statewide	G5 - secure
Hesperiidae	Amblyscirtes vialis	Common roadside-skipper	Resident in mountains	G5 - secure
Hesperiidae	Staphylus hayhurstii	Hayhurst's scallopwing	Resident statewide	G5 - secure
Hesperiidae	Panoquina panoquin	Salt marsh skipper	Resident along the coast	G5 - secure
Hesperiidae	Poanes zabulon	Zabulon skipper	Resident statewide	G5 - secure
Hesperiidae	Wallengrenia egeremet	Northern broken-dash	Resident statewide	G5 - secure
Hesperiidae	Wallengrenia otho	Southern broken-dash	Resident in southern coastal plain, visitor in the rest of the state	G5 - secure
Hesperiidae	Pompeius verna	Little glassywing	Resident statewide	G5 - secure
Hesperiidae	Atalopedes campestris	Sachem	Visitor in mountains and upper Piedmont, stray in the rest of the state	G5 - secure
Nymphalidae	Hermeuptychia sosybius	Carolina satyr	Resident statewide	G5 - secure
Hesperiidae	Amblyscirtes belli	Bell's roadside-skipper	Resident in mountains and upper Piedmont	G4 - apparently secure
Hesperiidae	Amblyscirtes carolina	Carolina roadside skipper	Resident in mountains, Piedmont, and upper coastal plain	G3 - vulnerable
Hesperiidae	Lerema accius	Clouded skipper	Resident in coastal plain, visitor in the rest of the state	G5 - secure
Hesperiidae	Hesperia metea	Cobweb skipper	Resident in north Georgia mountains	G4 - apparently secure
Hesperiidae	Euphyes vestris	Dun skipper	Resident statewide	G5 - secure
Hesperiidae	Amblyscirtes reversa	Reversed roadside skipper	Resident in Piedmont near South Carolina	G3 - vulnerable
Hesperiidae	Erynnis icelus	Dreamy duskywing	Resident in extreme northeast of the state	G5 - secure
Hesperiidae	Oligoria maculata	Twin-spot skipper	Resident in lower coastal plain and coast	G4 - apparently secure
Hesperiidae	Euphyes bimacula	Two-spotted skipper	Rare and local to Georgia, resident in a swath of the coastal plain	G4 - apparently secure
Hesperiidae	Amblyscirtes aesculapius	Lace-winged roadside-skipper	Resident stat-wide	G3 - vulnerable
Hesperiidae	Erynnis martialis	Mottled duskywing	Resident through most of the state, except southeast.	G3 - vulnerable
Hesperiidae	Thorybes confusis	Confused cloudywing	Resident in most of the state, visitor in upper Piedmont and mountains	G4 - apparently secure
Hesperiidae	Thorybes bathyllus	Southern cloudywing	Resident statewide	G5 - secure
Hesperiidae	Thorybes pylades	Northern cloudywing	Resident statewide	G5 - secure
Nymphalidae	Cyllopsis gemma	Gemmed Satyr	Resident statewide	G4 - apparently secure
Hesperiidae	Erynnis horatius	Horace's duskywing	Resident statewide	G5 - secure
Hesperiidae	Erynnis baptisiae	Wild indigo duskywing	Resident statewide	G5 - secure
Hesperiidae	Hesperia attalus	Dotted skipper	Resident solely in the extreme southeastern tip of the state	G3 - vulnerable
Hesperiidae	Poanes hobomok	Hobomok skipper	Resident in the extreme northern mountains	G5 - secure
Hesperiidae	Erynnis brizo	Sleepy duskywing	Resident statewide	G5 - secure
Hesperiidae	Poanes yehl	Yehl skipper	Resident in most of the state, except mountains	G4 - apparently secure
Hesperiidae	Atrytonopsis hianna	Dusted skipper	Resident satte-wide	G4 - apparently secure
Hesperiidae	Achalarus lyciades	Hoary edge	Resident statewide, except the coast	G5 - secure
Nymphalidae	Neonympha areolatus	Georgia satyr	Resident statewide except the mountains	G3 - vulnerable
Hesperiidae	Urbanus dorantes	Dorantes longtail	Stray in southeast Georgia	G5 - secure
Hesperiidae	Hesperia leonardus	Leonard's skipper	Resident in extreme northeast corner of the state	G4 - apparently secure
Hesperiidae	Panoquina ocola	Ocola skipper	Resident in southeast georgia, visitor in the rest of the state	G5 - secure
Nymphalidae	Megisto cymela	Little wood satyr	Resident statewide	G5 - secure
Hesperiidae	Erynnis juvenalis	Juvenal's duskywing	Resident statewide	G5 - secure
Hesperiidae	Erynnis zarucco	Zarucco duskywing	Resident statewide	G5 - secure
Nymphalidae	Libytheana carinenta	American snout	Resident in lower Piedmont and coastal plain, visitor in upper Piedmont and mountains.	G5 - secure
Hesperiidae	Autochton cellus	Golden-banded skipper	Resident in north Georgia	G4 - apparently secure
Hesperiidae	Urbanus proteus	Long-tailed skipper	Resident in south and southeast Georgia, visitor in most of the state, and stray in north Georgia mountains.	G5 - secure
Hesperiidae	Euphyes arpa	Palmetto skipper	Resident in extreme south Georgia along Florida border	G3 - vulnerable
Nymphalidae	Megisto viola	Viola's wood satyr	Resident in east Georgia along coast and southern South Carolina border	G5 - secure
Hesperiidae	Calpodes ethlius	Brazilian skipper	Visitor in south and coastal Georgia, stray in the rest of the state	G5 - secure
Nymphalidae	Satyrodes appalachia	Appalachian brown	Resident in southeast Georgia and north Georgia	G4 - apparently secure
Hesperiidae	Epargyreus clarus	Silver-spotted skipper	Resident statewide	G5 - secure
Nymphalidae	Junonia coenia	Common buckeye	Resident in coastal plain, visitor in Piedmont and mountains.	G5 - secure
Hesperiidae	Megathymus cofaqui	Cofaqui giant-skipper	Range limited to a north-south swath through the middle of Georgia	G3 - vulnerable
Nymphalidae	Enodia anthedon	Northern pearly eye	Resident in extreme north Georgia	G5 - secure
Nymphalidae	Asterocampa celtis	Hackberry butterfly	Resident statewide	G5 - secure
Nymphalidae	Cercyonis pegala	Common wood-nymph	Resident statewide	G5 - secure
Nymphalidae	Asterocampa clyton	Tawny emperor	Resident statewide	G5 - secure
Nymphalidae	Enodia portlandia	Southern pearly eye	Resident statewide	G4 - apparently secure
Hesperiidae	Megathymus yuccae	Yucca giant-skipper	Resident statewide except mountains	G5 - secure
Nymphalidae	Enodia creola	Creole pearly eye	Resident statewide except extreme south Georgia	G4 - apparently secure
Papilionidae	Papilio cresphontes	Giant swallowtail	Resident statewide	G5 - secure
Lycaenidae	Calycopis cecrops	Red-banded hairstreak	Resident statewide	G5 - secure
Lycaenidae	Celastrina nigra	Dusky azure	Resident only in extreme northeast Georgia	G4 - apparently secure
Lycaenidae	Strymon melinus	Gray hairstreak	Resident statewide	G5 - secure
Lycaenidae	Erora laeta	Early hairstreak	Resident only in extreme northeast Georgia	G2 - imperiled
Lycaenidae	Callophrys hesseli	Hessel's hairstreak	Rare, in small pockets in coastal plain	G5 - secure
Lycaenidae	Callophrys gryneus	Juniper hairstreak	Resident in most of the state, except a swath of western south Georgia. Found in stands of Eastern redcedar	G3 - vulnerable
Hesperiidae	Copaeodes minima	Southern skipperling	Resident in southeast Georgia and coastline, visitor in coastal plain and Piedmont	G5 - secure
Lycaenidae	Calephelis virginiensis	Little metalmark	Resident statewide except in mountains	G4 - apparently secure
Hesperiidae	Ancyloxypha numitor	Least skipper	Resident statewide	G5 - secure
Hesperiidae	Thymelicus lineola	European skipper	Visitor in the extreme northeast of the state	G5 - secure
Nymphalidae	Phyciodes phaon	Phaon crescent	Resident in Gulf coast and southeast Georgia, visitor further north and west	G5 - secure
Hesperiidae	Hylephila phyleus	Fiery skipper	Resident in south and coastal Georgia, visitor statewide	G5 - secure
Hesperiidae	Polites vibex	Whirlabout	Resident in coastal plain, visitor in Piedmont	G5 - secure
Lycaenidae	Lycaena phlaeas	American copper	Resident in north Georgia mountains	G5 - secure
Lycaenidae	Feniseca tarquinius	Harvester	Resident statewide	G5 - secure
Hesperiidae	Anatrytone logan	Delaware skipper	Resident statewide	G5 - secure
Hesperiidae	Poanes zabulon	Zabulon skipper	Resident statewide	G5 - secure
Nymphalidae	Chlosyne gorgone	Gorgone checkerspot	Resident in a swath of north Georgia	G5 - secure
Hesperiidae	Atalopedes campestris	Sachem	Visitor in mountains and upper Piedmont, stray throughout the rest of the state	G5 - secure
Hesperiidae	Atrytone arogos	Arogos skipper	Resident in a small area of east Georgia	G2 - imperiled
Hesperiidae	Hesperia sassacus	Indian skipper	Resident in a narrow band in the mountains	G5 - secure
Hesperiidae	Hesperia meskei	Meske's skipper	Resident in colonies in eastern Georgia	G3 - vulnerable
Nymphalidae	Phyciodes tharos	Pearl crescent	Resident statewide	G5 - secure
Hesperiidae	Poanes aaroni	Aaron's skipper	Resident in extreme southeast Georgia	G4 - apparently secure
Hesperiidae	Poanes hobomok	Hobomok skipper	Resident in north Georgia mountains	G5 - secure
Nymphalidae	Phyciodes batesii	Tawny crescent	Resident in extreme northeast Georgia	G5 - secure
Hesperiidae	Poanes yehl	Yehl skipper	Resident in most of Georgia, except mountains	G4 - apparently secure
Hesperiidae	Euphyes dion	Dion skipper	Resident in coastal plain	G5 - secure
Hesperiidae	Euphyes berryi	Berry's skipper	Resident in south, southeast, and coastal Georgia	G2 - imperiled
Hesperiidae	Problema byssus	Byssus skipper	Resident in bands across mid-north Georgia and south Georgia to the coast	G4 - apparently secure
Hesperiidae	Euphyes dukesi	Dukes' skipper	Resident along the coast	G3 - vulnerable
Pieridae	Eurema nicippe	Sleepy orange	Resident in most of the state, visitor in the mountains	G5 - secure
Nymphalidae	Chlosyne nycteis	Silvery checkerspot	Resident in northern parts of Georgia	G5 - secure
Hesperiidae	Poanes viator	Broad-winged skipper	Resident along coast and inland from coast	G5 - secure
Hesperiidae	Problema bulenta	Rare skipper	Resident along northern half of the coast	G3 - vulnerable
Hesperiidae	Euphyes pilatka	Palatka skipper	Resident along coast and inland from coast	G3 - vulnerable
Nymphalidae	Euptoieta claudia	Variegated fritillary	Resident in coastal plain, visitor in Piedmont and mountains	G5 - secure
Pieridae	Colias eurytheme	Orange sulphur	Resident statewide	G5 - secure
Nymphalidae	Vanessa cardui	Painted lady	Visitor statewide	G5 - secure
Nymphalidae	Vanessa virginiensis	American painted lady	Resident in most of the state, visitor in the mountains	G5 - secure
Nymphalidae	Polygonia faunus	Green comma	Resident in the northeast corner of the state	G5 - secure
Nymphalidae	Polygonia comma	Eastern comma	Resident statewide	G5 - secure
Nymphalidae	Polygonia progne	Gray comma	Stray in the extreme northeast corner of the state	G5 - secure
Nymphalidae	Anaea andria	Goatweed butterfly	Visitor in the western and southern borders, and southwest Georgia. Stray further east and north in Georgia.	G4 - apparently secure
Nymphalidae	Polygonia interrogationis	Question mark	Resident statewide	G5 - secure
Nymphalidae	Agraulis vanillae	Gulf fritillary	Resident in south Georgia, visitor in the rest of the state	G5 - secure
Nymphalidae	Limenitis archippus	Viceroy	Resident statewide	G5 - secure
Nymphalidae	Speyeria aphrodite	Aphrodite fritillary	Resident in the northeast corner of the state	G5 - secure
Nymphalidae	Danaus gilippus	Queen	Visitor in south and coastal Georgia, and stray in the rest of the state	G5 - secure
Nymphalidae	Speyeria cybele	Great spangled fritillary	Resident in north Georgia	G5 - secure
Nymphalidae	Danaus plexippus	Monarch	Visitor statewide	G4 - apparently secure
Nymphalidae	Speyeria diana	Diana fritillary	Resident in north Georgia	G2 - imperiled
Hesperiidae	Pyrgus communis	Common checkered-skipper	Resident statewide	G5 - secure
Hesperiidae	Pyrgus oileus	Tropical checkered skipper	Resident in extreme south Georgia	G5 - secure
Pieridae	Eurema daira	Barred sulphur	Resident in south and coastal Georgia, visitor in coastal plain, and stray in Piedmont and mountains	G5 - secure
Pieridae	Pieris virginiensis	West Virginia white	Resident in mountains	G2 - imperiled
Pieridae	Anthocharis midea	Falcate orangetip	Resident statewide except south Georgia	G5 - secure
Pieridae	Pontia protodice	Checkered white	Resident in most of the state, visitor in mountains	G5 - secure
Pieridae	Pieris rapae	Cabbage white	Resident statewide	G5 - secure
Pieridae	Ascia monuste	Great southern white	Visitor on coast, stray further inland	G5 - secure
Nymphalidae	Anartia jatrophae	White peacock	Stray along coast	G5 - secure
Pieridae	Colias philodice	Clouded sulphur	Resident in most of the state, except south Georgia and inland from the coast	G5 - secure
Papilionidae	Eurytides marcellus	Zebra swallowtail	Resident statewide	G5 - secure
Pieridae	Nathalis iole	Dainty sulphur	Visitor on the coast, stray inland and in south Georgia	G5 - secure
Pieridae	Eurema lisa	Little sulphur	Resident in south Georgia, visitor in the rest of the state	G5 - secure
Pieridae	Eurema daira	Barred sulphur	Resident in south and coastal Georgia, visitor in coastal plain, and stray in Piedmont and mountains	G5 - secure
Pieridae	Zerene cesonia	Southern dogface	Resident through most of the state, visitor in extreme south Georgia	G5 - secure
Pieridae	Colias philodice	Clouded sulphur	Resident in most of the state, except coast and south Georgia	G5 - secure
Pieridae	Phoebis sennae	Cloudless sulphur	Resident in south Georgia and along coastline, visitor in the rest of the state	G5 - secure
Pieridae	Phoebis statira	Statira sulphur	Stray in southeast Georgia	G5 - secure
Pieridae	Phoebis philea	Orange-barred sulphur	Stray statewide	G5 - secure
Papilionidae	Papilio glaucus	Eastern tiger swallowtail	Resident statewide	G5 - secure

== See also ==
- "Butterflies and Moths". New Georgia Encyclopedia.
