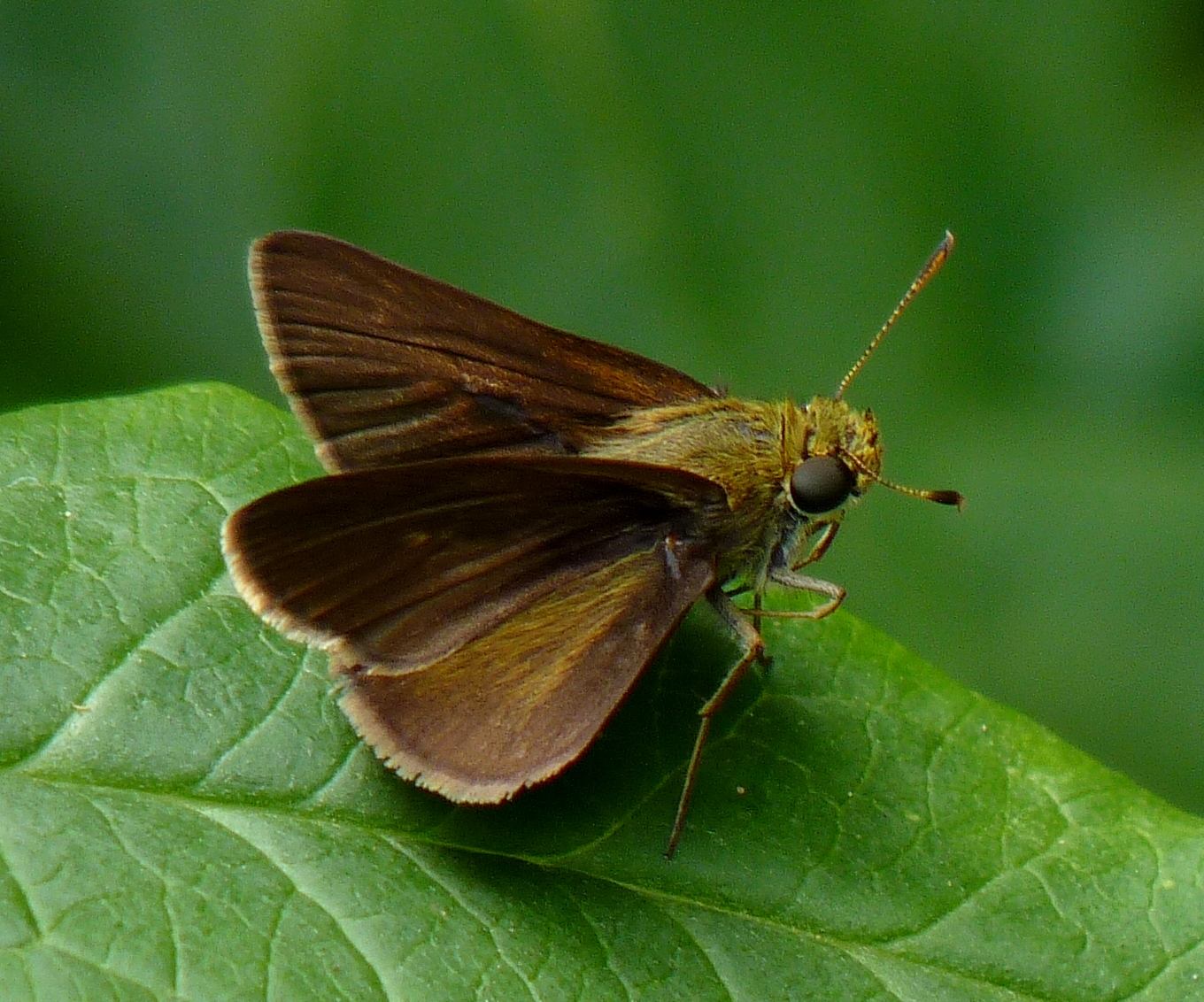
- Dun skipper, E. vestris
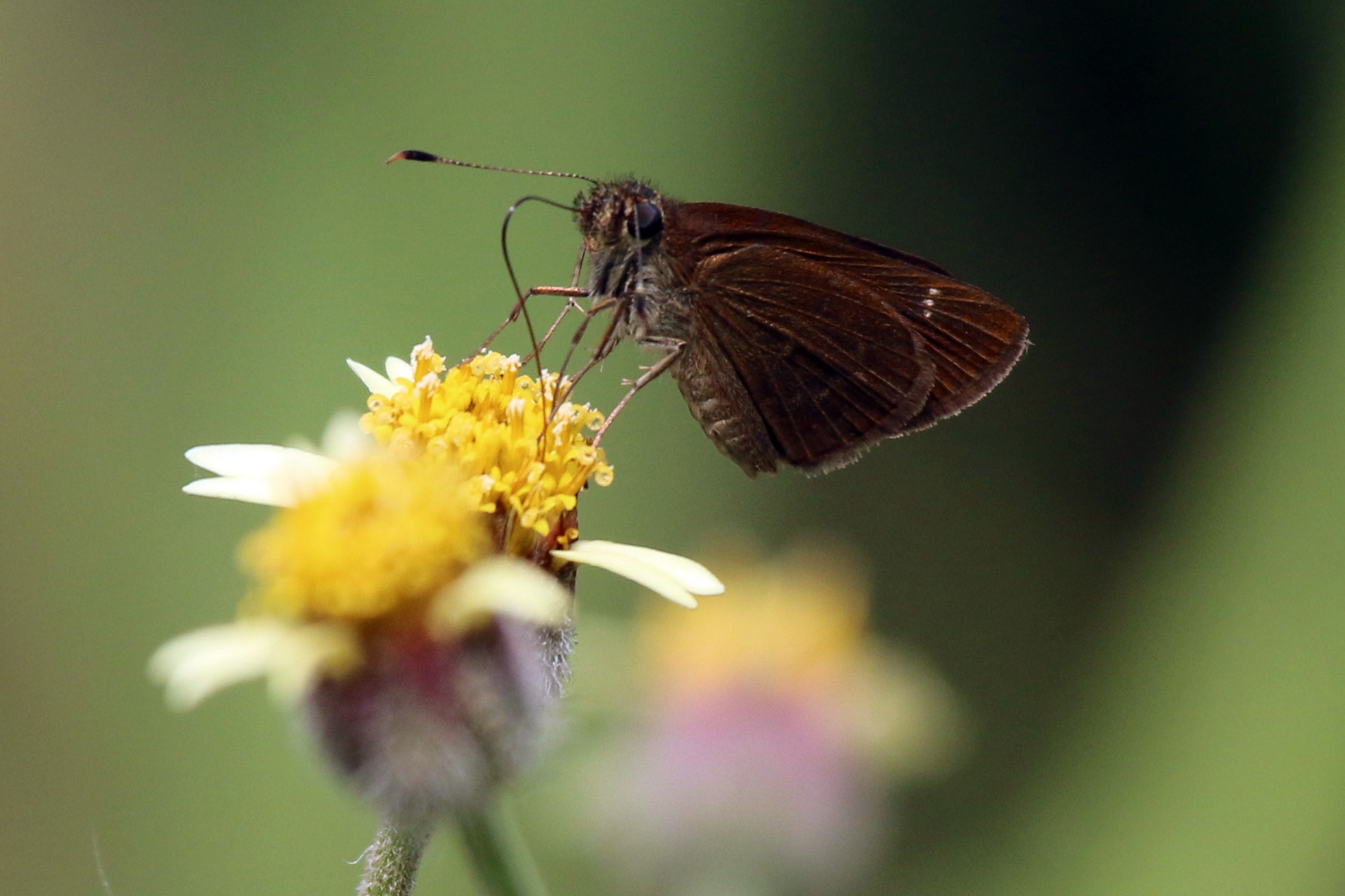
- Butler's branded skipper, E. singularis insolata

Scientific classification
- Kingdom: Animalia
- Phylum: Arthropoda
- Class: Insecta
- Order: Lepidoptera
- Family: Hesperiidae
- Tribe: Hesperiini
- Subtribe: Hesperiina
- Genus: Euphyes; Scudder, 1872

= Euphyes =

Genus of butterflies

The Euphyes is genus of North American butterfly of the family Hesperiidae (skippers), subfamily Hesperiinae (grass skippers).

== Species ==
The following species are recognised:

- Group peneia:
  - Euphyes cornelius (Latreille, [1824]) – Cornelius skipper
  - Euphyes eberti Mielke, 1972 – Ebert's skipper
  - Euphyes fumata Mielke, 1972 – fumata skipper
  - Euphyes leptosema Mabille, 1891 – leptosema skipper
  - Euphyes peneia (Godman, [1900]) – guardpost skipper
  - Euphyes singularis (Herrich-Schäffer, 1865) – singular skipper [Butler's branded skipper (E. s. insolata) in Jamaica
- Group subferruginea:
  - Euphyes antra Evans, 1955 – antra skipper
  - Euphyes cherra Evans, 1955 – cherra skipper
  - Euphyes subferrugineus (Hayward, 1934) – subferrugineus skipper
- Group dion:
  - Euphyes bayensis Shuey, 1989 – bay skipper
  - Euphyes berryi (E. Bell, 1941) – Berry's skipper
  - Euphyes conspicua (W. H. Edwards, 1863) – black dash
    - E. c. buchholzi (P. Ehrlich and Gillham, 1951)
    - E. c. conspicua (W. H. Edwards, 1863)
    - E. c. orono (Scudder, 1872)
  - Euphyes dion (W. H. Edwards, 1879) – dion skipper
  - Euphyes dukesi (Lindsey, 1923) – Dukes' skipper
    - E. d. calhouni Shuey, 1996
    - E. d. dukesi (Lindsey, 1923)
  - Euphyes pilatka (W. H. Edwards, 1867) – Palatka skipper or saw-grass skipper
    - E. p. klotsi L. Miller, Harvey and J. Miller, 1985
    - E. p. pilatka (W. H. Edwards, 1867)
- Group vestris:
  - Euphyes arpa (Boisduval & Le Conte, [1837]) – palmetto skipper
  - Euphyes bimacula (Grote & Robinson, 1867) – two-spotted skipper
    - E. b. arbotsti Gatrelle, 1999
    - E. b. bimacula (Grote & Robinson, 1867)
    - E. b. illinois (Dodge, 1872)
  - Euphyes kiowah (Reakirt, 1866)
    - Euphyes k. chamuli Freeman, 1969 – Chamul skipper
    - Euphyes k. kiowah (Reakirt, 1866)
  - Euphyes vestris (Boisduval, 1852) – dun skipper, sedge witch, or dun sedge skipper
    - E. v. harbisoni J. Brown and Mcguire, 1983
    - E. v. metacomet (T. Harris, 1862)
    - E. v. vestris (Boisduval, 1852)
- Incertae sedis:
  - Euphyes ampa Evans, 1955 – ampa skipper
  - Euphyes canda (Steinhauser & Warren, [2002]) – Candelaria skipper
