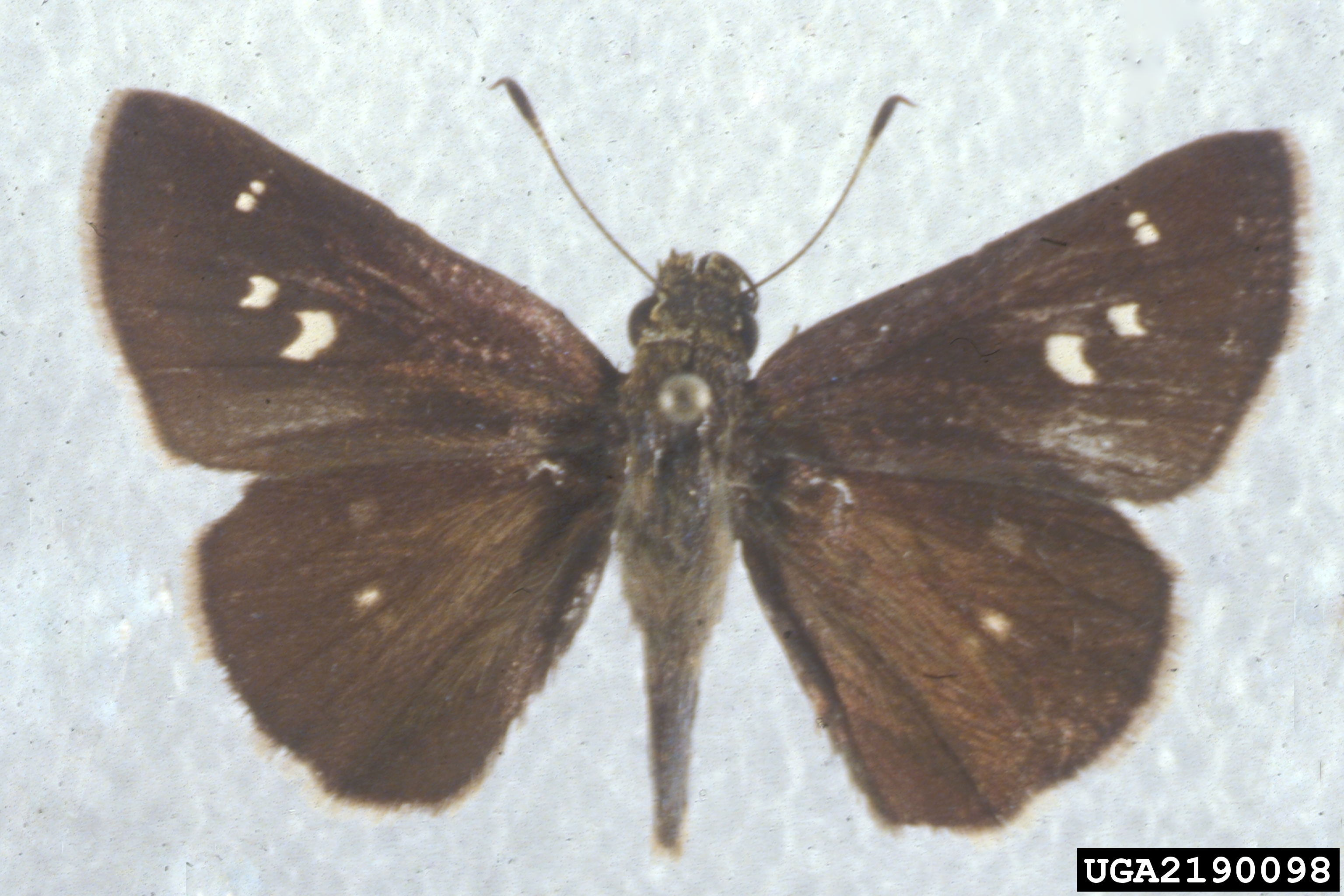

Conservation status
- Apparently Secure (NatureServe)

Scientific classification
- Domain: Eukaryota
- Kingdom: Animalia
- Phylum: Arthropoda
- Class: Insecta
- Order: Lepidoptera
- Family: Hesperiidae
- Genus: Oligoria
- Species: O. maculata

Binomial name
- Oligoria maculata (Edwards, 1865)

Synonyms
- List: Hesperia maculata Edwards, 1865; Cobalus grossula Herrich-Schäffer, 1869; Cobalus deleta Herrich-Schäffer, 1869; Hesperia norus Plötz, 1883; Oligoria orthomenes (Scudder, 1889)

= Oligoria maculata =

Species of butterfly

Oligoria maculata, the twin-spot skipper, is a species of butterfly in the family Hesperiidae. It is found in the United States along the coast of North Carolina south through Florida and west along the Gulf Coast to east Texas. Strays can be found as far north as Pennsylvania, Maryland and New Jersey.

The wingspan is 35–42 mm. The wings are rounded and brown black. There are four transparent spots on the upperside of the forewings. The underside of the hindwings has a pale red-brown overlay and three white spots. Adults are on wing from April to September in two or possibly three generations per year. They feed on flower nectar of various plant species, including Pontederia species.

The larvae feed on various Poaceae species.
