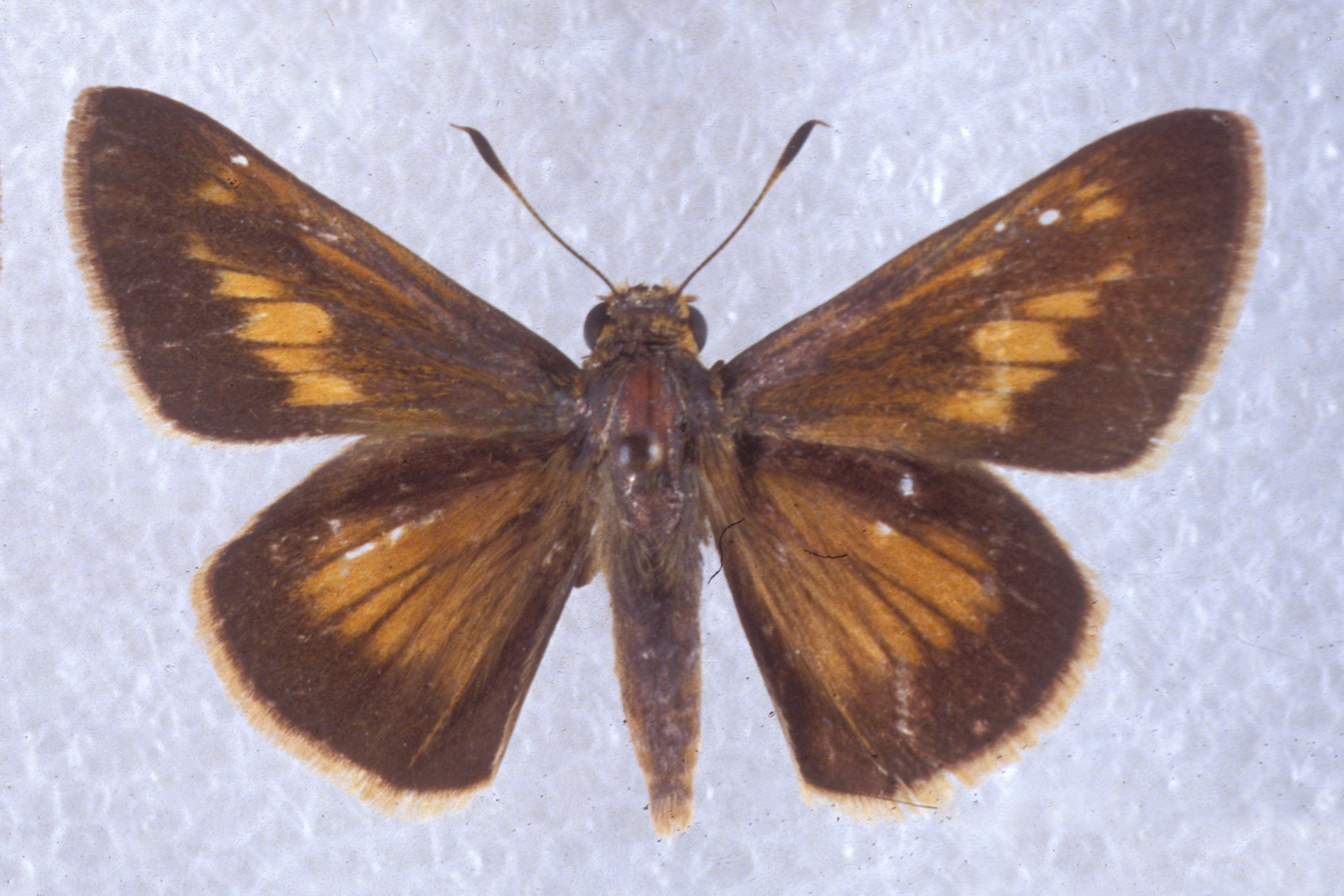

Conservation status
- Vulnerable (NatureServe)

Scientific classification
- Domain: Eukaryota
- Kingdom: Animalia
- Phylum: Arthropoda
- Class: Insecta
- Order: Lepidoptera
- Family: Hesperiidae
- Genus: Euphyes
- Species: E. pilatka

Binomial name
- Euphyes pilatka (Edwards, 1867)

Synonyms
- Hesperia pilatka Edwards, 1867; Limochroes palatka; Atrytone pilatka; Euphyes floridanensis (Plötz, 1883)

= Euphyes pilatka =

Species of butterfly

Euphyes pilatka, the Palatka skipper or saw-grass skipper, is a butterfly of the family Hesperiidae. It is found in the United States from southeastern Virginia south to peninsular Florida and the Florida Keys, then west along the Gulf Coast to southern Mississippi. Strays can be found up to northern Maryland and southwestern Louisiana.

The wingspan is 45–54 mm.

The larvae feed on the leaves of Cladium jamaicensis. They live in shelters of rolled leaves.

== Subspecies ==
- Euphyes pilatka pilatka
- Euphyes pilatka klotsi L. Miller, Harvey & J. Miller, 1985 (Florida Keys)
