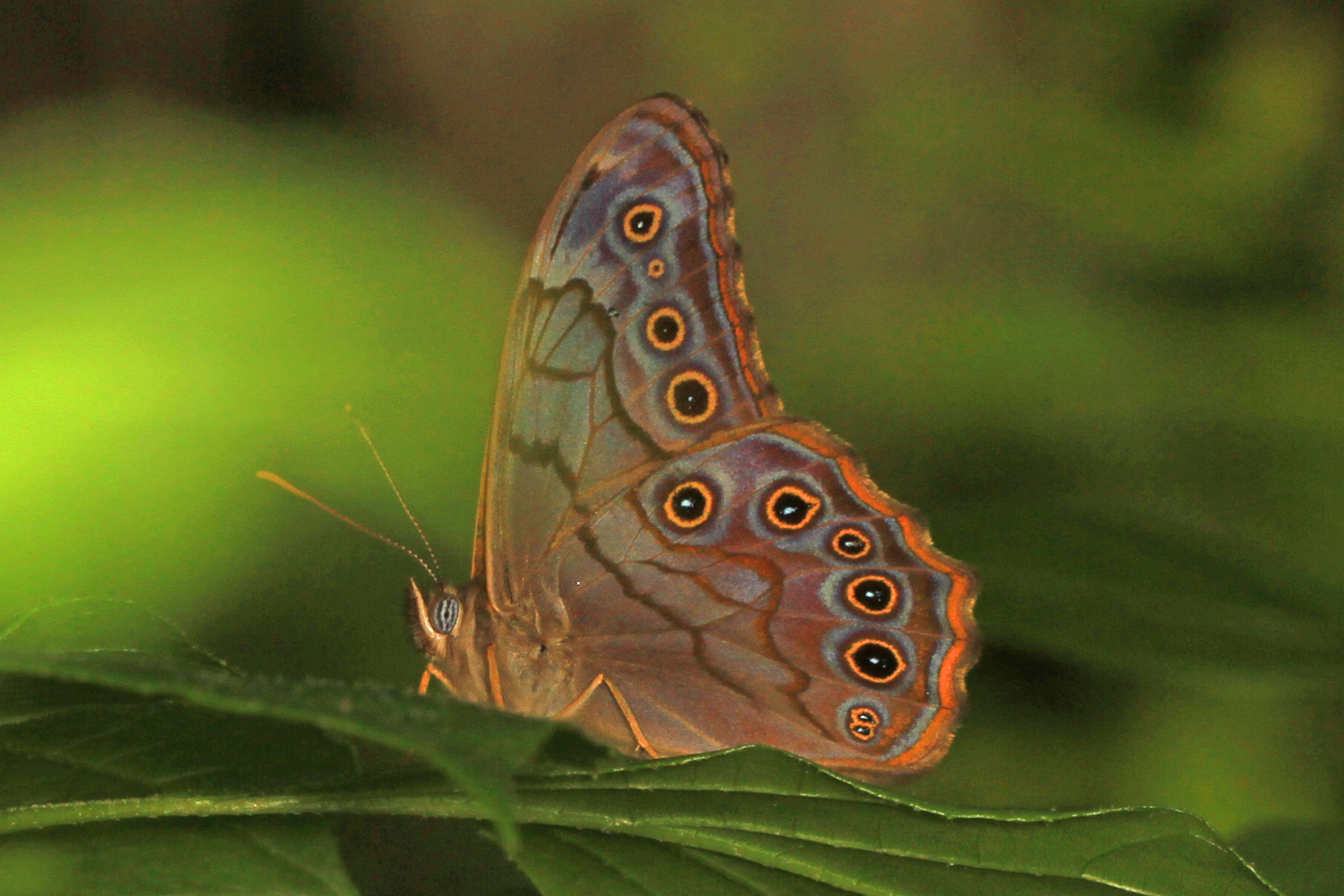

Conservation status
- Apparently Secure (NatureServe)

Scientific classification
- Kingdom: Animalia
- Phylum: Arthropoda
- Clade: Pancrustacea
- Class: Insecta
- Order: Lepidoptera
- Family: Nymphalidae
- Genus: Lethe
- Species: L. creola

Binomial name
- Lethe creola (Skinner, 1897)

Synonyms
- Enodia creola Skinner, 1897; Debis creola Skinner, 1897

= Lethe creola =

Species of butterfly

Lethe creola, the creole pearly-eye, is a species of brush-footed butterfly in the family Nymphalidae. It is found it the United States from North Carolina and central Georgia west to eastern Oklahoma and eastern Texas. Some authorities include this species in the genus Enodia as Enodia creola.
