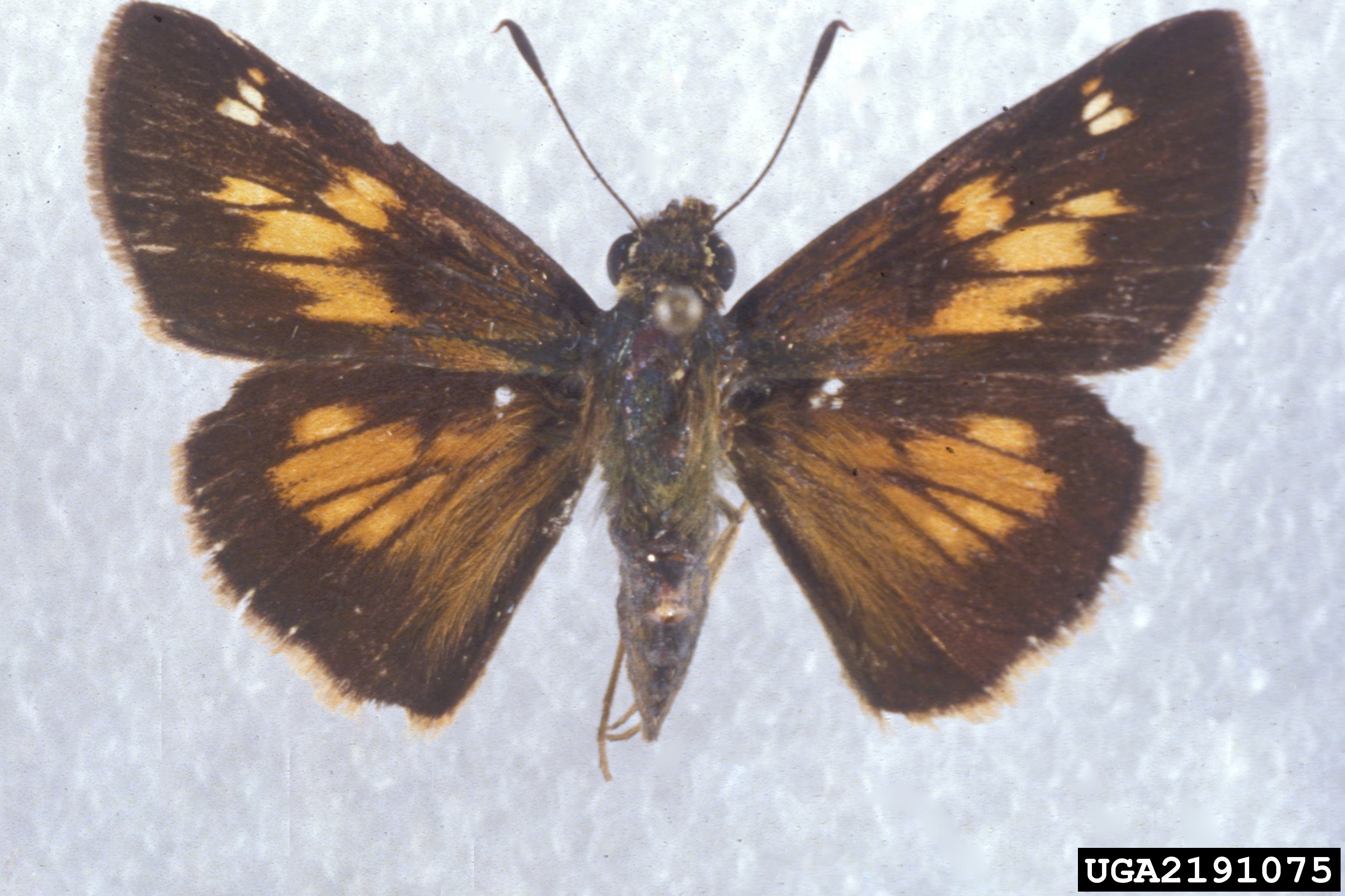
- Female
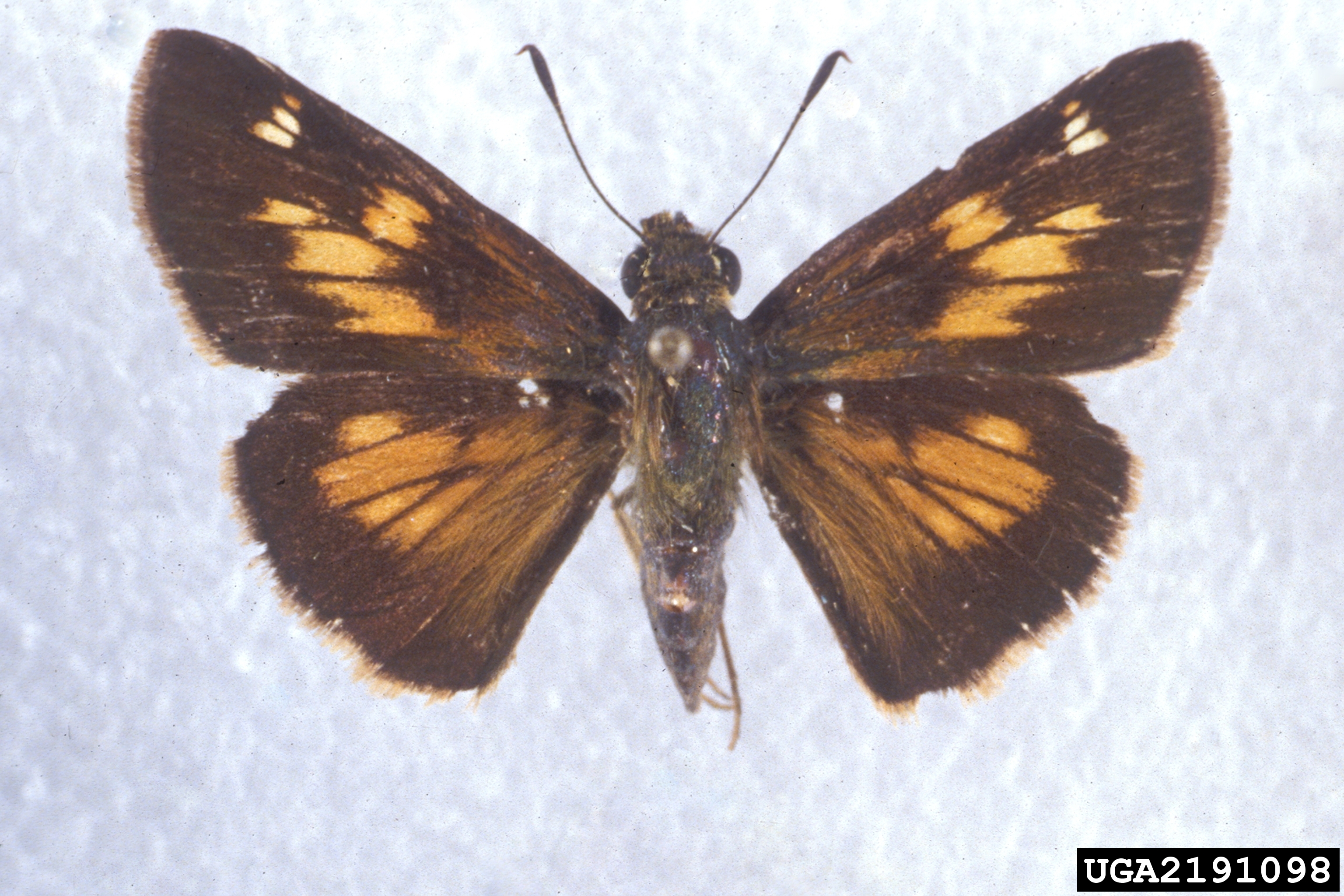
- Male

Conservation status
- Apparently Secure (NatureServe)

Scientific classification
- Kingdom: Animalia
- Phylum: Arthropoda
- Class: Insecta
- Order: Lepidoptera
- Family: Hesperiidae
- Genus: Poanes
- Species: P. yehl

Binomial name
- Poanes yehl (Skinner, 1893)

Synonyms
- Limochroes yehl

= Poanes yehl =

Species of butterfly

Poanes yehl, the Yehl skipper, is a butterfly of the family Hesperiidae. It is found from southeastern Virginia west to southwestern Missouri and south to eastern Texas, the Gulf Coast and northern Florida.

The wingspan is 34–45 mm. The upperside is bright orange with wide dark borders. The underside of the hindwings is dark brown in females and orange in males. Both sexes have three to five pale median spots. Adults feed on the nectar of various flowers, including sweet pepperbush, chinquapin, pickerelweed and swamp milkweed.

The larvae probably feed on Arundinaria species.
