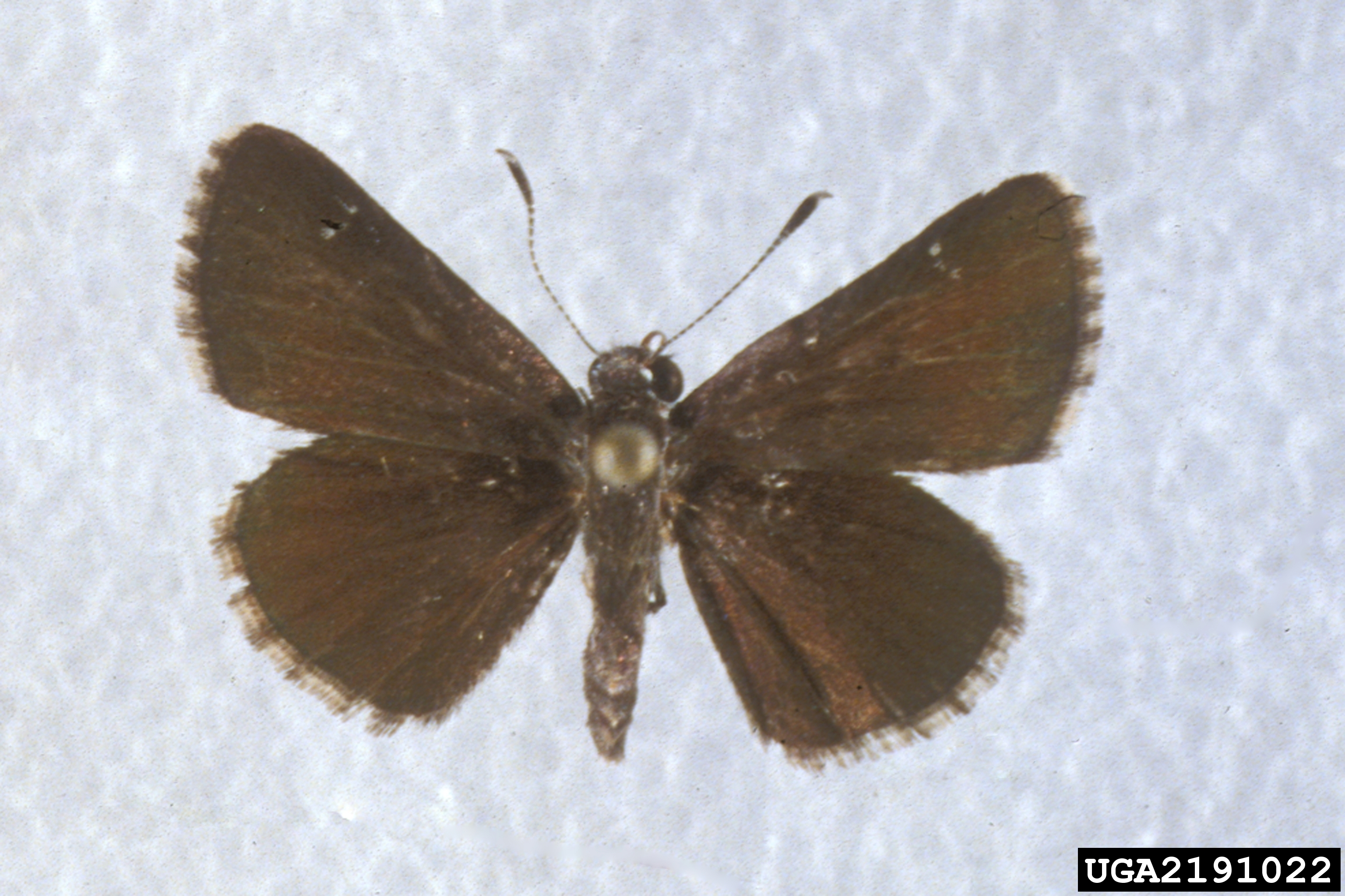

Conservation status
- Imperiled (NatureServe)

Scientific classification
- Kingdom: Animalia
- Phylum: Arthropoda
- Class: Insecta
- Order: Lepidoptera
- Family: Hesperiidae
- Genus: Amblyscirtes
- Species: A. alternata

Binomial name
- Amblyscirtes alternata (Grote & Robinson, 1867)

Synonyms
- Hesperia alternata Grote & Robinson, 1867; Amblyscirtes meridionalis Dyar, 1905

= Amblyscirtes alternata =

Species of butterfly

Amblyscirtes alternata (the dusky roadside skipper or blue-dusted roadside skipper) is a butterfly of the family Hesperiidae. It is found from south-eastern Virginia south to Florida, west to east Texas.

The wingspan is 22–25 mm. There are two generations with adults on wing from March to August in most of the range. There might be three generations with adults on wing as late as November in Florida, the Gulf states, and Texas.

Adults feed on flower nectar.
