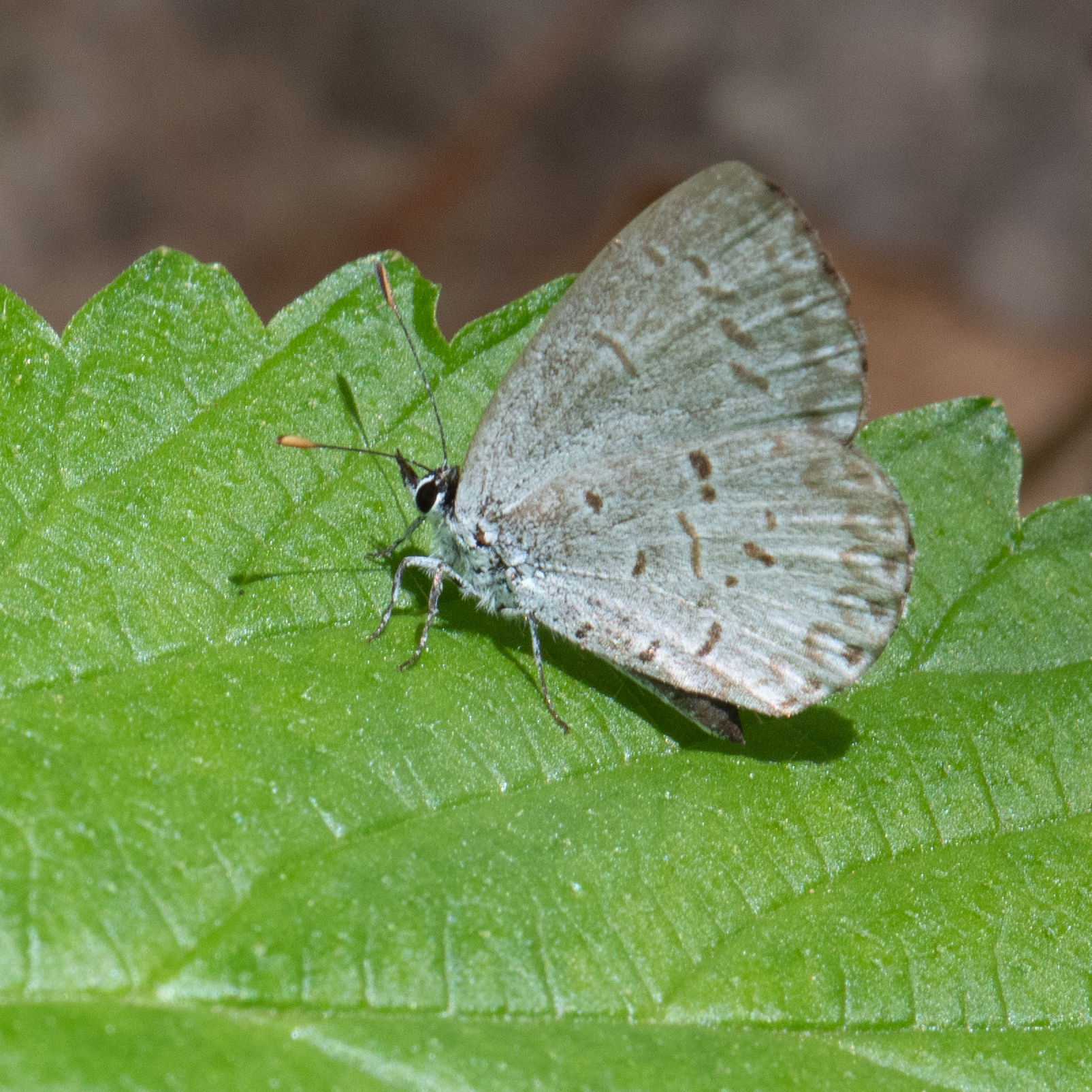

Conservation status
- Apparently Secure (NatureServe)

Scientific classification
- Kingdom: Animalia
- Phylum: Arthropoda
- Clade: Pancrustacea
- Class: Insecta
- Order: Lepidoptera
- Family: Lycaenidae
- Genus: Celastrina
- Species: C. nigra

Binomial name
- Celastrina nigra W. Forbes, 1960
- The range of Celastrina nigra in West Virginia

= Celastrina nigra =

Species of butterfly

Celastrina nigra, the dusky azure, is a butterfly in the family Lycaenidae. The species was first described by William Trowbridge Merrifield Forbes in 1960. It resides in the extreme northeast corner of the U.S. state of Georgia. The larval host plant is Aruncus dioicus (goat's beard).
