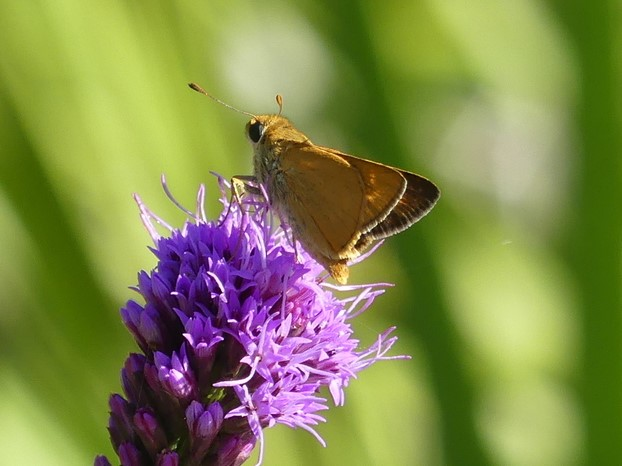
- Hesperia meskei straton

Conservation status
- Vulnerable (NatureServe)

Scientific classification
- Kingdom: Animalia
- Phylum: Arthropoda
- Clade: Pancrustacea
- Class: Insecta
- Order: Lepidoptera
- Family: Hesperiidae
- Genus: Hesperia
- Species: H. meskei

Binomial name
- Hesperia meskei (W. H. Edwards, 1877)

= Hesperia meskei =

Species of butterfly

Hesperia meskei, commonly known as Meske's skipper, is a species of grass skipper in the butterfly family Hesperiidae. It is found in North America.

== Subspecies ==
These three subspecies belong to the species Hesperia meskei:

- Hesperia meskei meskei (W. H. Edwards, 1877)
- Hesperia meskei pinocayo Gatrelle & Minno in Gatrelle, Minno & Grkovich, 2003
- Hesperia meskei straton (W. H. Edwards, 1881)
