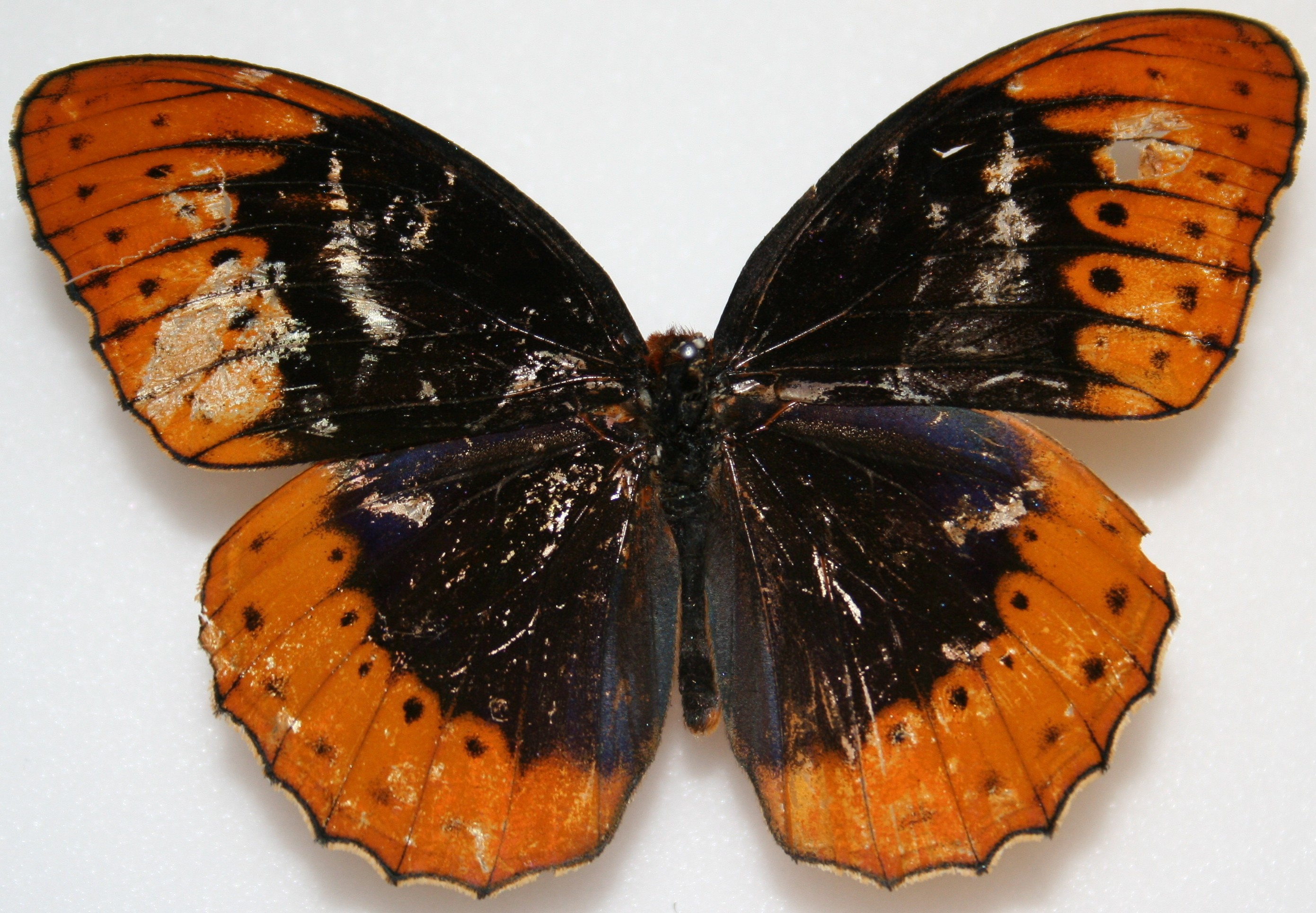
- Male

Conservation status
- Imperiled (NatureServe)

Scientific classification
- Kingdom: Animalia
- Phylum: Arthropoda
- Clade: Pancrustacea
- Class: Insecta
- Order: Lepidoptera
- Family: Nymphalidae
- Genus: Speyeria
- Species: S. diana

Binomial name
- Speyeria diana (Cramer, 1779)

= Diana fritillary =

Species of butterfly

The Diana fritillary (Speyeria diana) is a fritillary butterfly found in several wooded areas in southern and eastern North America (primarily in the Arkansas River valley, several counties in South Carolina, spots along the Appalachian mountain range, and a few places on the southern Cumberland Plateau).

On February 28, 2007, Act 156 of the Arkansas General Assembly designated the Diana fritillary as the official state butterfly. Introduced by Representative John Paul Wells of Logan County, the legislation for making the butterfly a state symbol took note of the butterfly's beauty, educational importance, and impact on tourism. Arkansas is the only state to designate the Diana fritillary as its state butterfly; pairing it with its state insect, the honeybee. Arkansas is the twenty-sixth state to designate a butterfly as a state symbol.

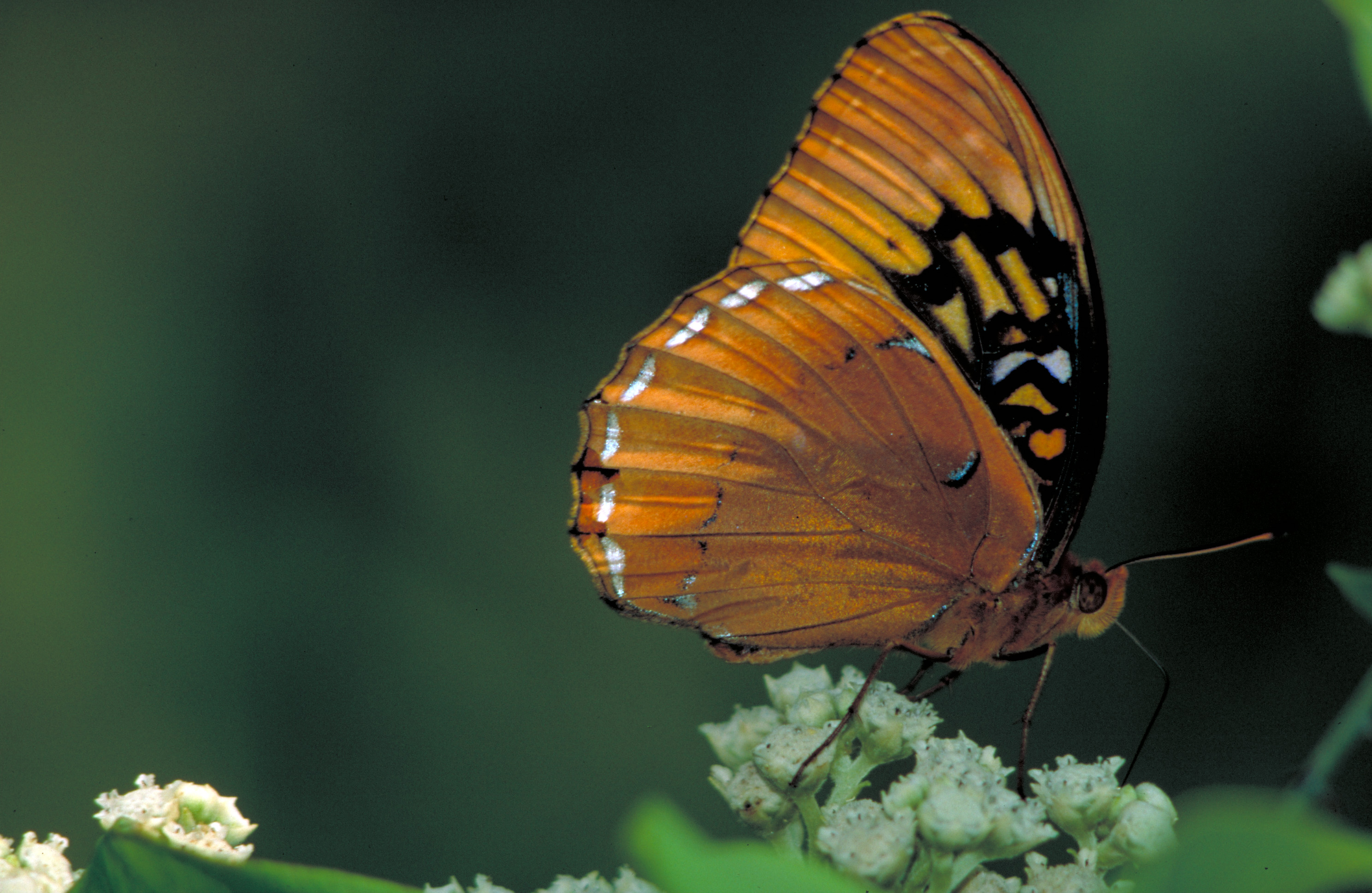
Living specimen (male)

== Description ==
The species exhibits marked sexual dimorphism, with males of the species exhibiting an orange color on the edges of their wings, with a burnt orange underwing. Females are dark blue, with dark, almost dusty underwings, and are also larger than males.

== Life cycle ==
The larvae feed on violet leaves. Dianas are unusual in that they do not lay their eggs directly on the host plant, instead scattering the eggs around the base of the plant. Upon hatching, larvae burrow into the ground over winter to emerge in spring. Adults feed on flower nectar and dung.

== Threats ==
A major threat to this species is climate change since it has altered and affected the Diana fritillary butterfly's natural habitat. The Diana fritillary population in the Appalachian Mountains and populations living out west will have a decrease of their kind. Other threats to the Diana fritillary butterflies include loss of habitat and agricultural development. Overall, the Diana fritillary species is expected to have a population decrease by the year 2050.
