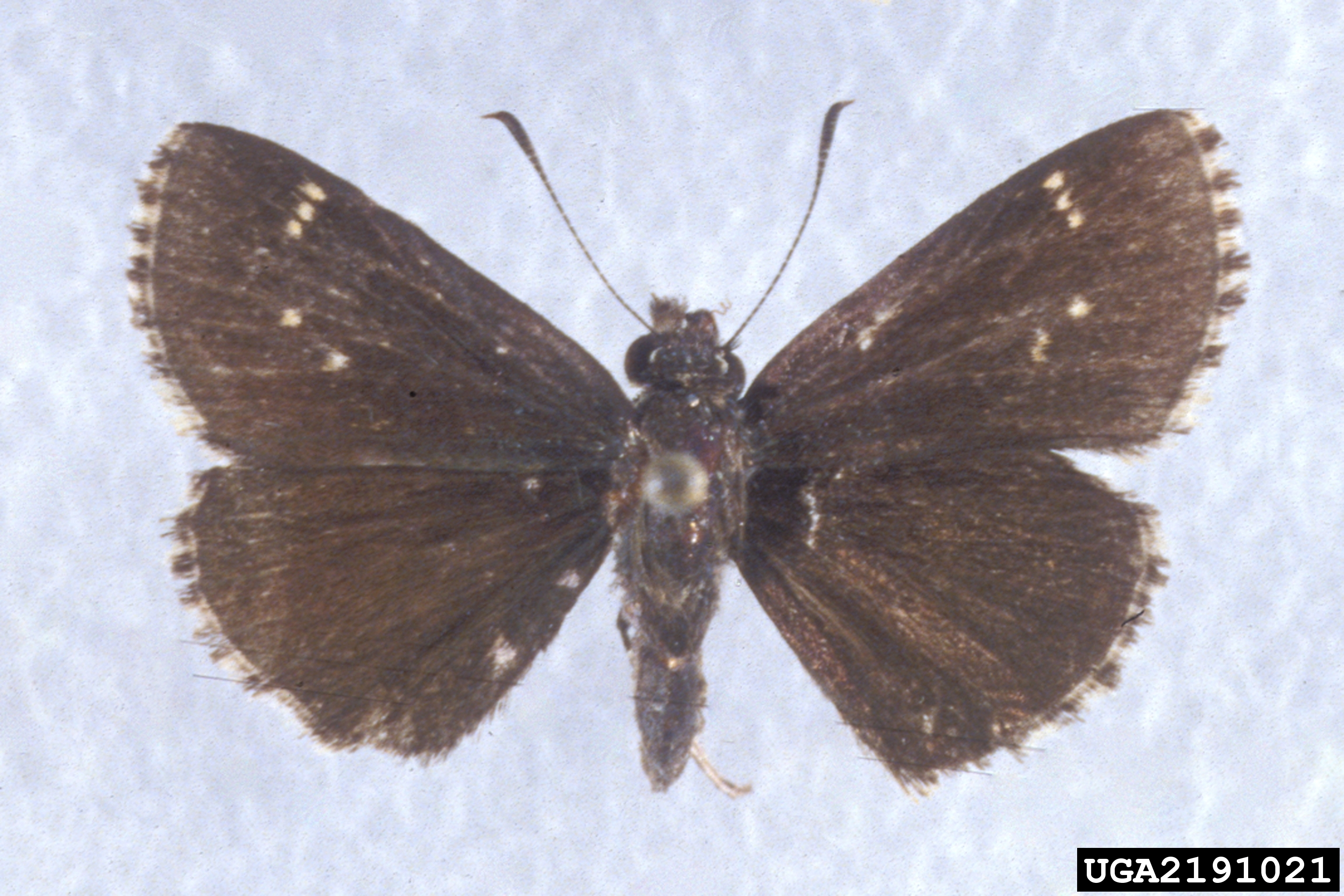

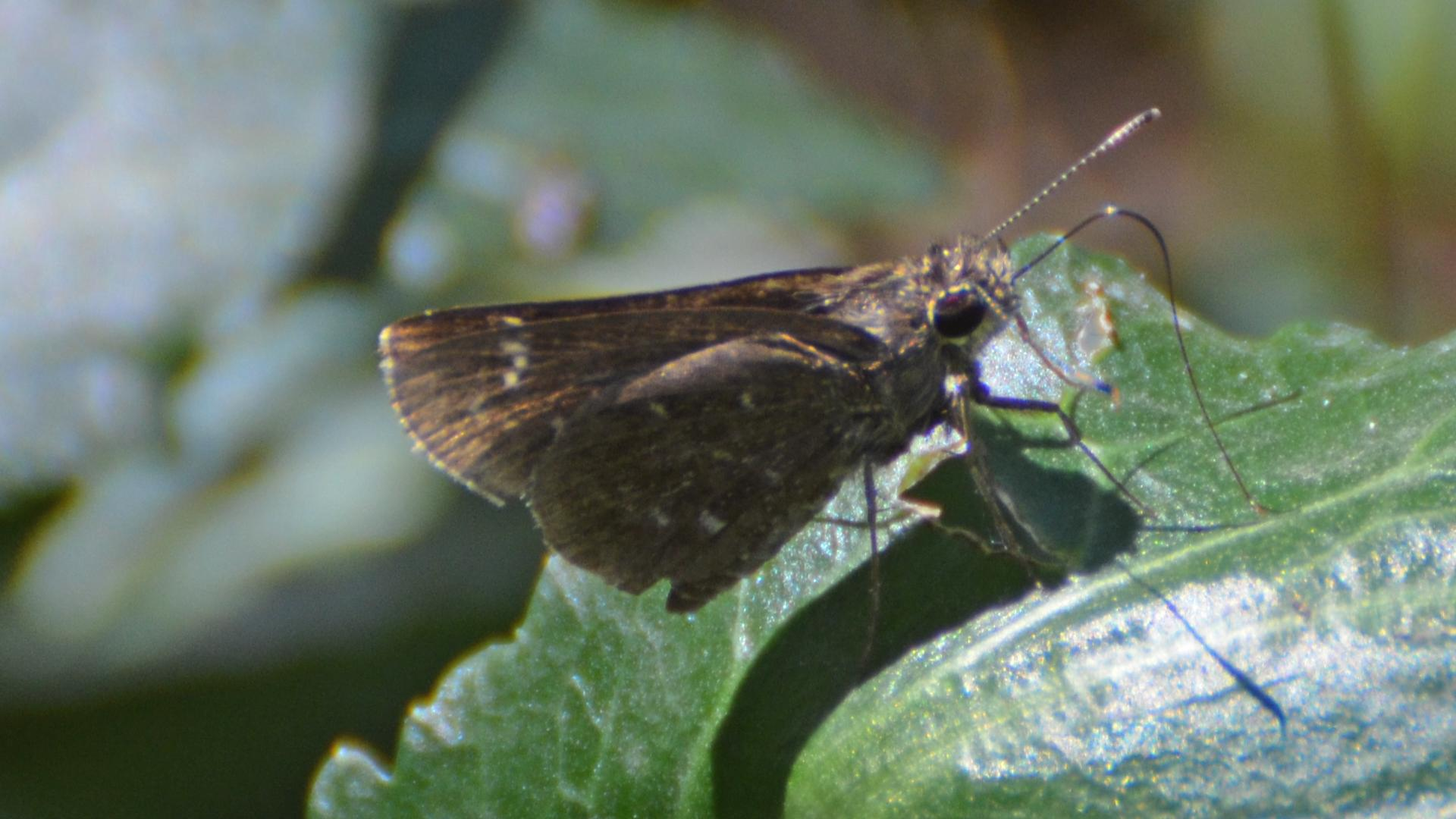

Conservation status
- Apparently Secure (NatureServe)

Scientific classification
- Kingdom: Animalia
- Phylum: Arthropoda
- Class: Insecta
- Order: Lepidoptera
- Family: Hesperiidae
- Genus: Amblyscirtes
- Species: A. belli

Binomial name
- Amblyscirtes belli Freeman, 1941

= Amblyscirtes belli =

Species of butterfly

Amblyscirtes belli (Bell's roadside skipper) is a butterfly of the family Hesperiidae. It is found from eastern Kansas, central Oklahoma and central Texas east to south-west Ohio, central Kentucky, eastern Tennessee and western South Carolina.

The wingspan is 30–32 mm. Adults are on wing from April to September. There are three generations per year.

The larvae feed on Chasmanthium latifolia. Adults feed on flower nectar.
