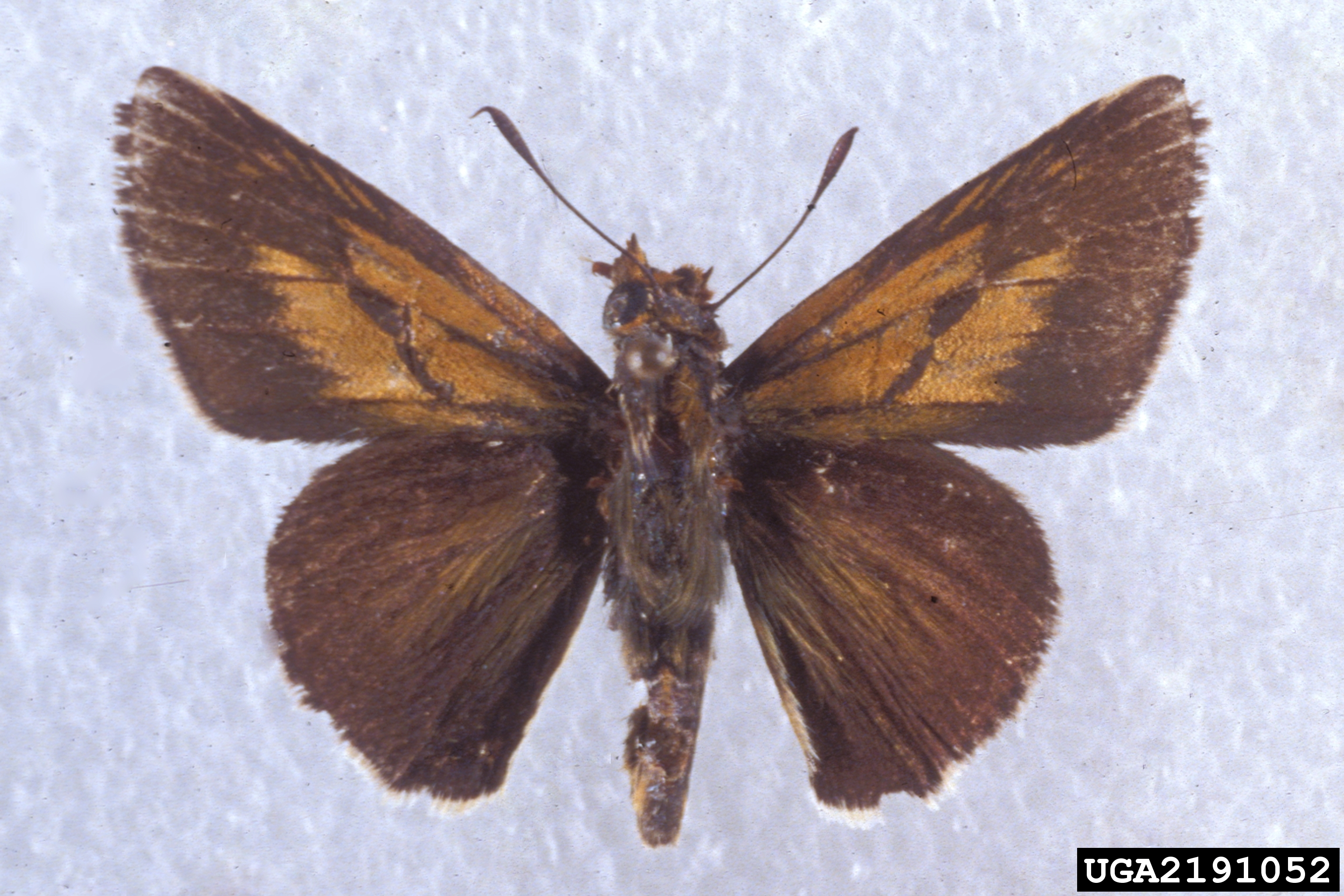

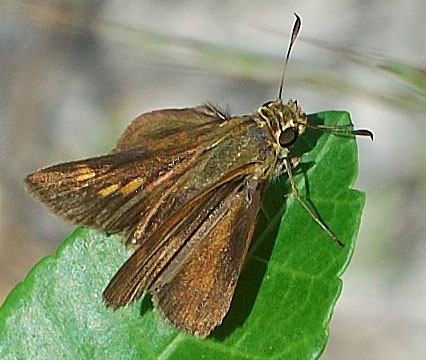

Conservation status
- Vulnerable (NatureServe)

Scientific classification
- Kingdom: Animalia
- Phylum: Arthropoda
- Class: Insecta
- Order: Lepidoptera
- Family: Hesperiidae
- Genus: Euphyes
- Species: E. arpa

Binomial name
- Euphyes arpa (Boisduval & Le Conte, [1837])

Synonyms
- Hesperia arpa Boisduval & Le Conte, [1837]; Limochores arpa Dyar, 1903; Atrytone arpa

= Euphyes arpa =

Species of butterfly

Euphyes arpa, the palmetto skipper, is a butterfly of the family Hesperiidae.

== Description ==
The wingspan is 41–49 mm. Males are more colorful, portraying a bright orange body with black borders, while females have more neutral coloring. Both have orange heads and an orange underside. The Euphyes arpa are most commonly found in Florida, but have been documented in Alabama, Mississippi, and Georgia. Although this species has been nicknamed the Palmetto Lowcountry Skipper, they have not been recorded in the low country of the Palmetto State, South Carolina, or the surrounding regions. The Euphyes Arpa are endangered, but have a readily available food source, so their decline is relatively inexplicable.

== Taxonomy ==
Euphyes arpa, commonly known as the Palmetto Skipper, is recognized as a valid species within the genus Euphyes, supported by the Integrated Taxonomic Information System (TSN 706605). The Animal Diversity Web places it under Kingdom Animalia, Class Insecta, Order Lepidoptera, and Family Hesperiidae. The Global Lepidoptera Names Index also confirms the validity of the name "Euphyes arpa " within the genus Euphyes. Finally, ITIS corroborates this with the original authorship attribution to Boisduval & Le Conte (1837).

== Species description ==
These butterflies are big and easy to spot. They have a wingspan of 1 and 3/4 - 2 inches. Both sexes have a yellow-orange underside to their hindwings as well as a bright orange thorax and head. However, the upper side of the forewing differs between male and female. Males have black borders with a reddish-yellow color and a black hindwing. Males are marked by a sex-mark called a stigma patch located on their forewings. A stigma is defined as a mark with scent cells that release pheromones. In the case of the Palmetto Skipper, they have a 2-part black stigma. While females have a black upper side with few reddish-yellow patches. The coloring of the males and their stigmas are helpful for females to find males while they are waiting for a mate in sedge marshes.

== Ecology ==
The larvae feed on the fronds of the palm species Serenoa repens, the saw palmetto, and live in silken tubes at the frond base. The species overwinters in the larval stage.

Palmetto Skippers are nectivores, and can often be encountered at flowers. In order to search for females to mate with, males often perch themselves on the blades of palmetto scrub. While the males are doing this, females are depositing eggs towards the stem on the scrub, near the blade's base.

Adults feed on flower nectar from various plants, including the pickerelweeds (genus Pontederia). Adult males perch in sedge marshes to await females.

Where the Palmetto Skipper is mainly located can be determined by the name itself: Lowland Palmetto Scrub. Palmetto Scrub is a thick palm that is usually subterranean and can grow above ground. Habitat is generally moist with low palmetto scrub, including open pine flats, and forested scrub/shrub wetlands, with a necessary abundance of saw palmetto.

== Range ==
These butterflies are distributed along the south east coast. E. arpa is found in most of Florida, and immediately adjacent Georgia, Alabama, and Mississippi, possibly established resident only in Florida and Mississippi.

== Genetics ==
The Palmetto Skipper is a part of the species Euphyes arpa, the family of Hesperiidae, and the subfamily Hesperiina. In terms of evolution, it is not known the exact characteristics and traits the skipper may have gained or lost in response to the everchanging environment. The skipper originated around 80 million years ago and have evolved to have characteristics of both moths and butterflies. It also exclusively feeds from the saw palmetto as it is readily available to them in their habitat.

== Brood ==
Adults occur in most of Florida from about March to November, apparently with several broods per year.

== Conservation status ==
Palmettos Skippers are slowly declining in population for an unknown reason. The species has not been assessed for the IUCN Red List. NatureServe ranks the species with a rounded global conservation status of G3: vulnerable. The species may be extirpated in the Florida Keys. The suspected reason for their declining population is having a limited range, but they have an abundant food source, creating confusion for their mysterious decline.
