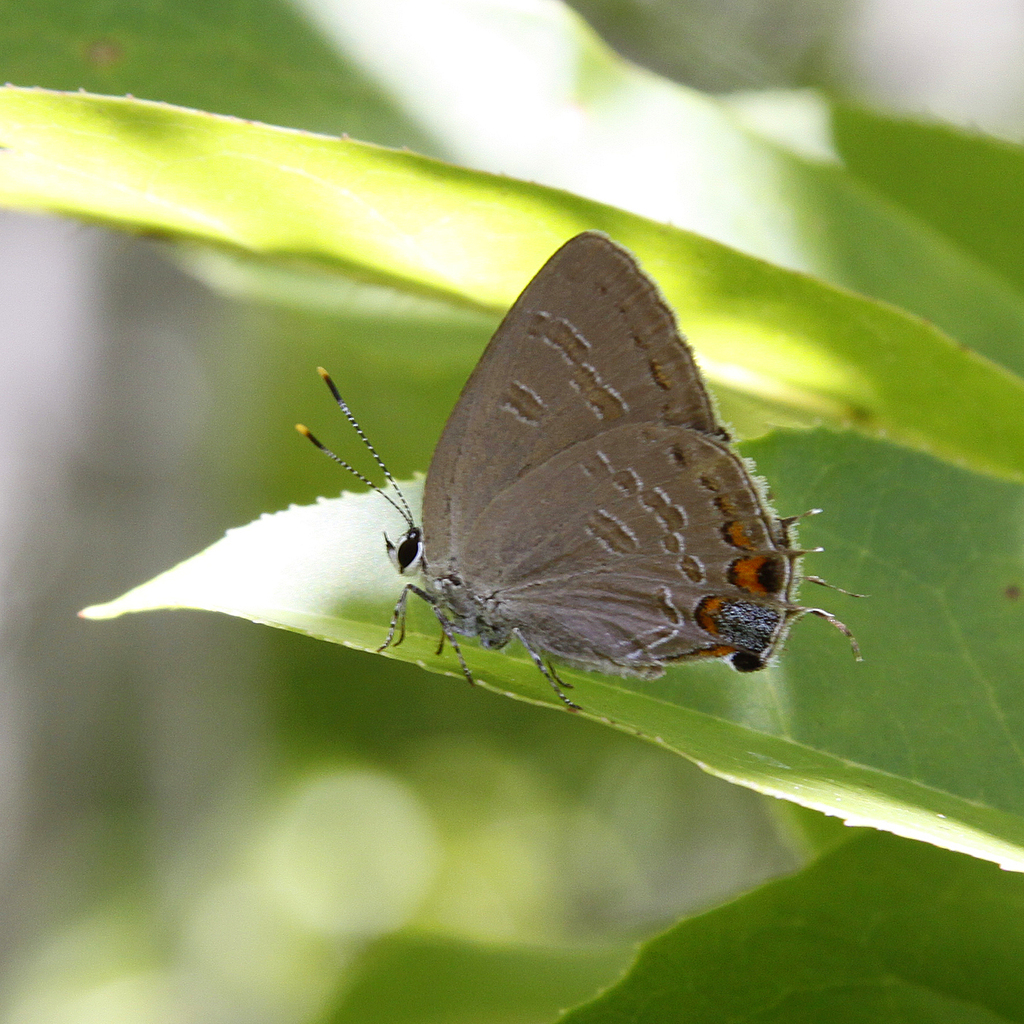

Conservation status
- Vulnerable (NatureServe)

Scientific classification
- Kingdom: Animalia
- Phylum: Arthropoda
- Clade: Pancrustacea
- Class: Insecta
- Order: Lepidoptera
- Family: Lycaenidae
- Tribe: Eumaeini
- Genus: Satyrium
- Species: S. kingi

Binomial name
- Satyrium kingi (Klots & Clench, 1952)

= Satyrium kingi =

Species of butterfly

Satyrium kingi, or King's hairstreak, is a species of hairstreak in the butterfly family Lycaenidae.

The MONA or Hodges number for Satyrium kingi is 4284.
