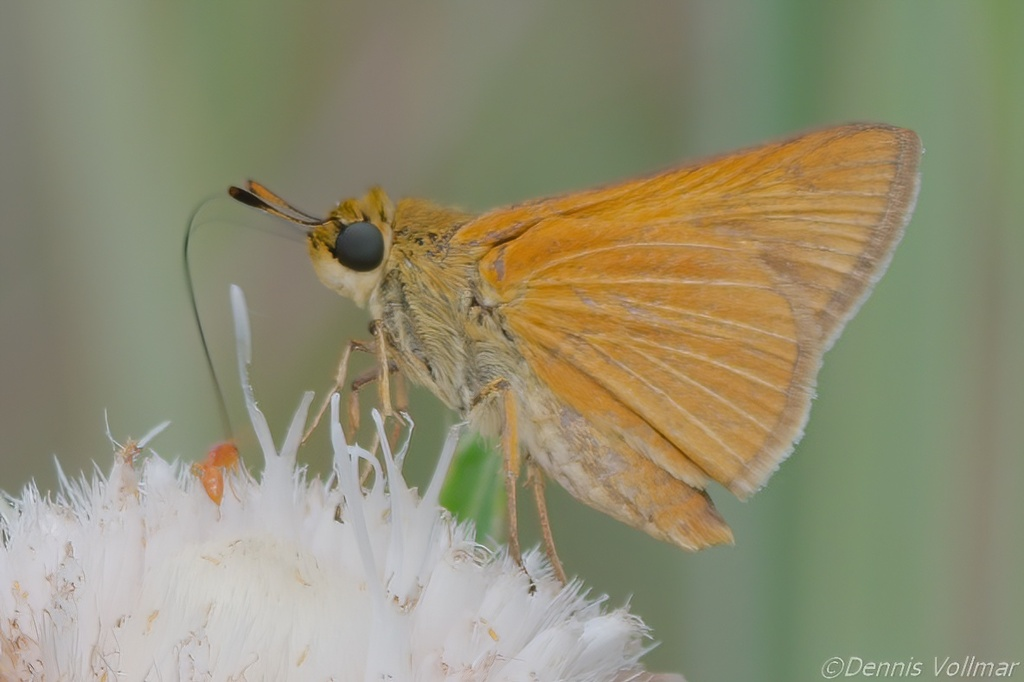

Conservation status
- Imperiled (NatureServe)

Scientific classification
- Domain: Eukaryota
- Kingdom: Animalia
- Phylum: Arthropoda
- Class: Insecta
- Order: Lepidoptera
- Family: Hesperiidae
- Genus: Euphyes
- Species: E. berryi

Binomial name
- Euphyes berryi (Bell, 1941)

Synonyms
- Atrytone berryi Bell, 1941

= Euphyes berryi =

Species of butterfly

Euphyes berryi, known as Berry's skipper, is a rare species of butterfly of the family Hesperiidae, historically found in wet areas from North Carolina to Florida.

Another common name proposed for the species is Florida swamp skipper, a name also proposed for a subspecies of Euphyes dukesi, Euphyes dukesi calhouni Shuey, 1996. Shuey felt that the name was “somewhat inappropriately” proposed by Pyle in 1981 for Euphyes berryi, a species “not endemic to Florida and which is found in open wetlands, not swamps.”

== Description ==
Wingspan of adult males is 36–38 millimetres (1.42–1.50 in), and of adult females is 38–42 millimetres (1.50–1.65 in). Body and head are mostly brownish to fulvous (a dull brownish yellow), antennae black above and fulvous beneath. Male wings are mostly bright fulvous upperside, and darker or brownish fulvous underside, with darker brown borders and some spot patterns. Female wings are mostly black brown upper side, with dark fulvous undersides. Hindwing undersides of both genders distinctly show paler, yellowish fulvous veins.

Identification of the species is considered difficult, with individuals of Euphyes dion, Euphyes byssus and probably other skippers that sometimes lack normal hindwing patterns closely resembling Euphyes berryi.

== Range and habitat ==
Euphyes berryi was historically found in outer coastal plains from North Carolina (north to Dare County) to southern Florida (North Carolina, South Carolina, Georgia and Florida). It may be extirpated from portions of its historic range.

Its habitat consists of wet areas near ponds and swamps, including wet prairies, marshes, and savannas with pitcher plants.

== Ecology ==
The larvae of E. berryi feed on various sedges, probably one or more species of Carex. Adults feed on nectar from various flowers, including pickerelweed (genus Pontederia).

The larvae overwinter, and adults have been reported from March to October, probably from two broods.

== Status ==
Euphyes berryi’s NatureServe conservation status, last reviewed in 2015, is G1G3, a range from critically imperiled to vulnerable due to significant uncertainty and limited knowledge of its habitat. The rounded average global threat status is G2 (imperiled).

== Etymology ==
Euphyes berryi was named by Ernest Layton Bell “for Mr. Dean F. Berry of Orlando, Florida, who collected most of the specimens.” Bell himself was an amateur but active entomologist and taxonomist.
