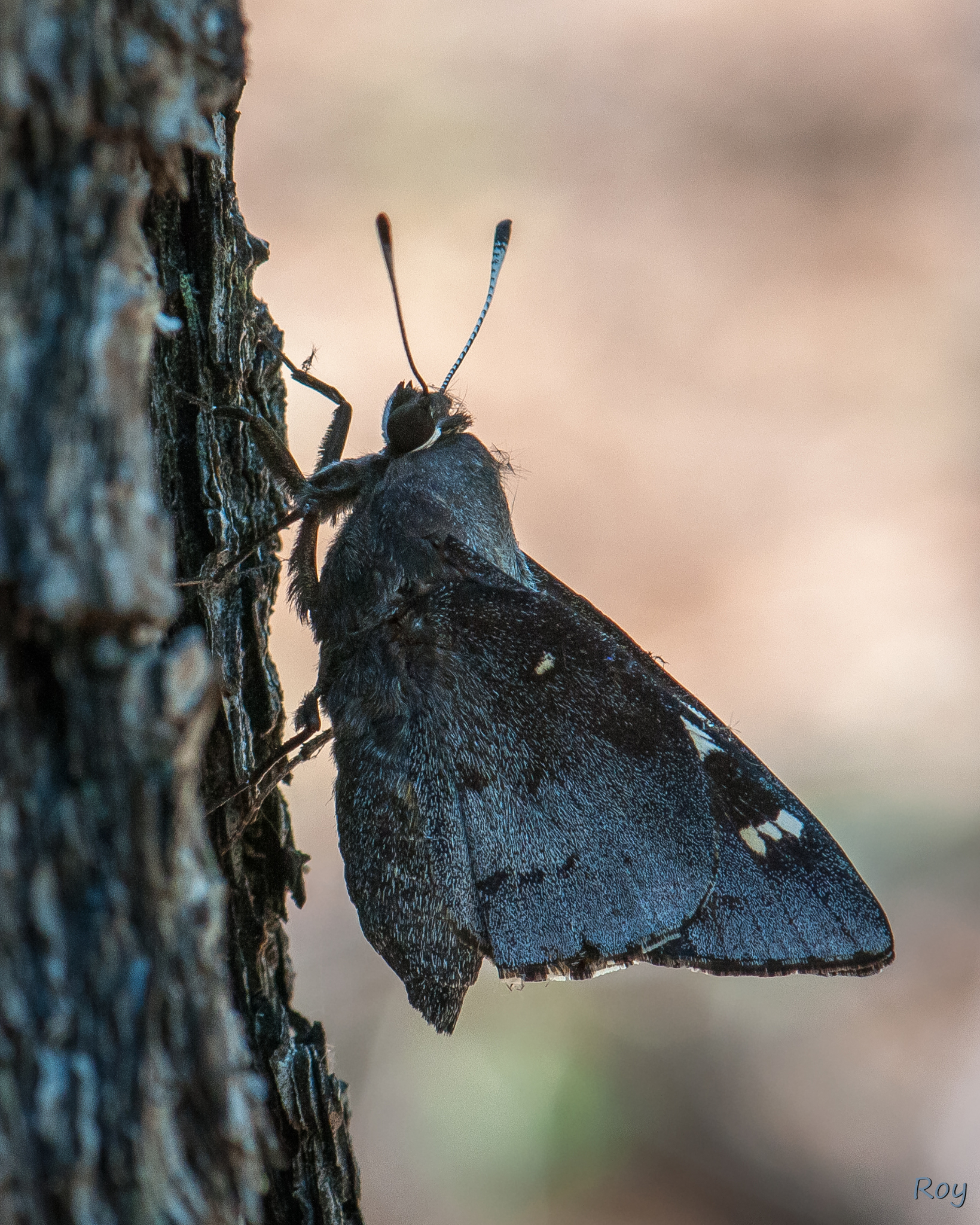

Conservation status
- Vulnerable (NatureServe)

Scientific classification
- Kingdom: Animalia
- Phylum: Arthropoda
- Class: Insecta
- Order: Lepidoptera
- Family: Hesperiidae
- Genus: Megathymus
- Species: M. cofaqui

Binomial name
- Megathymus cofaqui Strecker, 1876

= Megathymus cofaqui =

Species of butterfly

Megathymus cofaqui, the Cofaqui giant-skipper, is a butterfly in the family Hesperiidae. Its range is limited to a north–south swath through the middle of Georgia in the United States.
