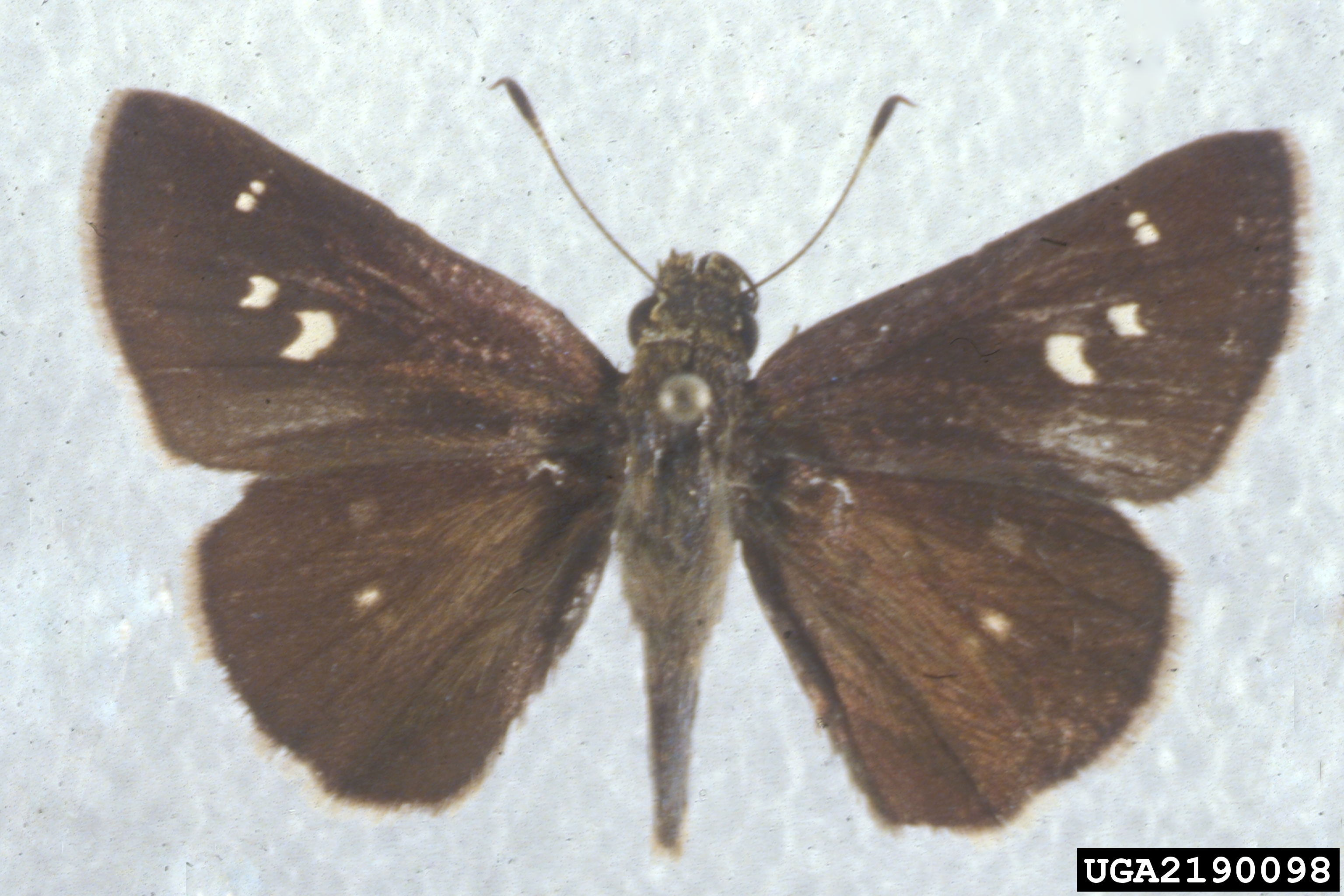

Scientific classification
- Kingdom: Animalia
- Phylum: Arthropoda
- Class: Insecta
- Order: Lepidoptera
- Family: Hesperiidae
- Tribe: Hesperiini
- Genus: Oligoria; Scudder, 1872

= Oligoria =

Genus of butterflies

Oligoria is a genus of butterflies in the family Hesperiidae.
