= List of butterflies of Connecticut =

This is a list of butterflies that can be found in the U.S. state of Connecticut. The list is in alphabetical order by scientific name.

- Achalarus lyciades – hoary edge
- Amblyscirtes hegon – pepper and salt skipper
- Amblyscirtes vialis – common roadside skipper
- Anatrytone logan – Delaware skipper
- Ancyloxypha numitor – least skipper
- Anthocharis midea – falcate orangetip
- Asterocampa celtis – hackberry emperor
- Asterocampa clyton – tawny emperor
- Atalopedes campestris – sachem
- Atrytonopsis hianna – dusted skipper
- Battus philenor – pipevine swallowtail
- Boloria bellona – meadow fritillary
- Boloria selene – silver-bordered fritillary
- Calephelis borealis – northern metalmark
- Callophrys augustinus – brown elfin
- Calycopis cecrops – red-banded hairstreak
- Callophrys gryneus – juniper (olive) hairstreak
- Callophrys henrici – Henry's elfin
- Callophrys hesseli – Hessel's hairstreak
- Callophrys irus – frosted elfin
- Callophrys niphon – eastern pine elfin
- Callophrys polia – hoary elfin
- Carterocephalus palaemon – Arctic skipper
- Celastrina ladon – spring azure
- Celastrina neglecta – summer azure
- Celastrina neglectamajor – Appalachian azure
- Cercyonis pegala – common wood nymph
- Chlosyne harrisii – Harris' checkerspot
- Chlosyne nycteis – silvery checkerspot
- Coenonympha tullia – common ringle
- Colias eurytheme – orange sulphur
- Colias philodice – clouded sulphur
- Danaus plexippus – monarch
- Enodia anthedon – northern pearly eye
- Epargyreus clarus – silver-spotted skipper
- Erynnis baptisiae – wild indigo duskywing
- Erynnis brizo – sleepy duskywing
- Erynnis horatius – Horace's duskywing
- Erynnis icelus – dreamy duskywing
- Erynnis juvenalis – Juvenal's duskywing
- Erynnis lucilius – columbine duskywing
- Erynnis martialis – mottled duskywing
- Erynnis persius – Persius duskywing
- Erynnis zarucco – zarucco duskywing
- Euphyes bimacula – two-spotted skipper
- Euphyes conspicua – black dash
- Euphyes dion – Dion skipper
- Euphyes vestris – dun skipper
- Eurema lisa – little yellow
- Eurema nicippe – sleepy orange
- Everes comyntas – eastern tailed blue
- Feniseca tarquinius – harvester
- Fixsenia favonius – southern hairstreak
- Glaucopsyche lygdamus – silvery blue
- Hesperia leonardus – Leonard's skipper
- Hesperia metea – cobweb skipper
- Hesperia sassacus – Indian skipper
- Hylephila phyleus – fiery skipper
- Junonia coenia – common buckeye
- Libytheana carinenta – American snout
- Limenitis archippus – viceroy
- Limenitis arthemis – red-spotted purple/white admiral
- Lon zabulon – Zabulon skipper
- Lycaena epixanthe – bog copper
- Lycaena hyllus – bronze copper
- Lycaena phlaeas – American copper
- Megisto cymela – little wood satyr
- Nastra lherminier – swarthy skipper
- Nymphalis antiopa – mourning cloak
- Nymphalis milberti – Milbert's tortoiseshell
- Nymphalis vaualbum – Compton tortoiseshell
- Panoquina ocola – ocola skipper
- Papilio canadensis – Canadian tiger swallowtail
- Papilio cresphontes – giant swallowtail
- Papilio glaucus – eastern tiger swallowtail
- Papilio polyxenes – black swallowtail
- Papilio troilus – spicebush swallowtail
- Parrhasius m-album – white M hairstreak
- Phoebis sennae – cloudless sulphur
- Pholisora catullus – common sootywing
- Phyciodes tharos – pearl crescent
- Pieris protodice – checkered white
- Pieris rapae – cabbage white
- Pieris virginiensis – West Virginia white
- Poanes hobomok – Hobomok skipper
- Poanes massasoit – mulberry wing
- Poanes viator – broad-winged skipper
- Polites mystic – long dash
- Polites origenes – crossline skipper
- Polites peckius – Peck's skipper
- Polites themistocles – tawny-edged skipper
- Polygonia comma – eastern comma
- Polygonia interrogationis – question mark
- Polygonia progne – gray comma
- Pompeius verna – little glassy wing
- Pyrgus communis – checkered skipper
- Satyrium acadicum – Acadian hairstreak
- Satyrium calanus – banded hairstreak
- Satyrium caryaevorum – hickory hairstreak
- Satyrium edwardsii – Edwards hairstreak
- Satyrium liparops – striped hairstreak
- Satyrium titus – coral hairstreak
- Satyrodes appalachia – Appalachian brown
- Satyrodes eurydice – eyed brown
- Speyeria aphrodite – Aphrodite fritillary
- Speyeria atlantis – Atlantis fritillary
- Speyeria cybele – great spangled fritillary
- Strymon melinus – gray hairstreak
- Thorybes bathyllus – southern cloudywing
- Thorybes pylades – northern cloudywing
- Thymelicus lineola – European skipper
- Urbanus proteus – long-tailed skipper
- Vanessa atalanta – red admiral
- Vanessa cardui – painted lady
- Vanessa virginiensis – American lady
- Wallengrenia egeremet – northern broken dash
- Zerene cesonia – southern dogface
