= List of butterflies of Maryland =

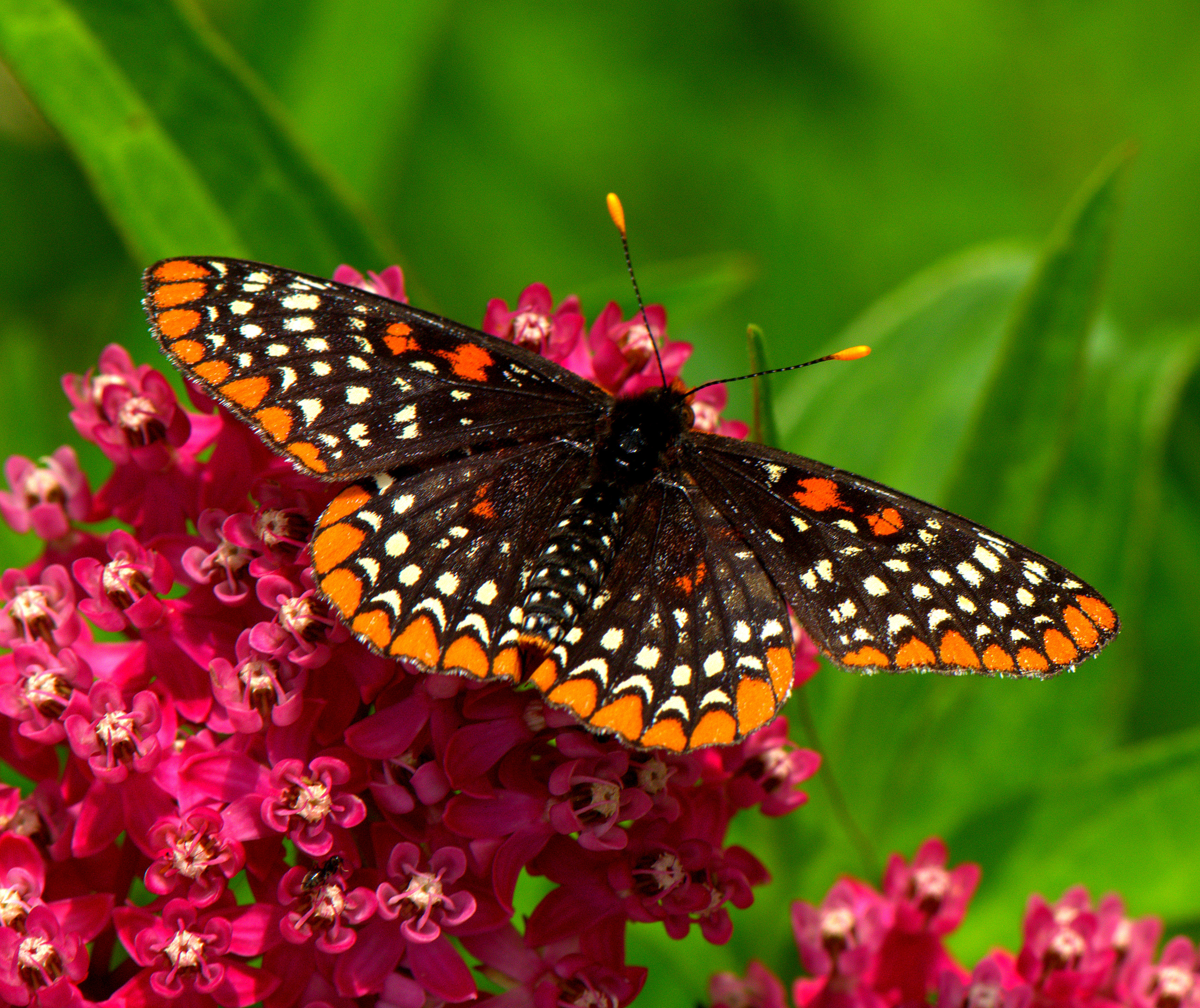
A Baltimore checkerspot, the state insect of Maryland.

This is a list of butterflies in the U.S. state of Maryland.

== Papilionidae ==
- Eastern tiger swallowtail, Papilio glaucus
- Canadian tiger swallowtail, Papilio canadensis
- Zebra swallowtail, Eurytides marcellus
- Pipevine swallowtail, Battus philenor
- Spicebush swallowtail, Papilio troilus
- Black swallowtail, Papilio polyxenes
- Palamedes swallowtail, Papilio palamedes
- Giant swallowtail, Papilio cresphontes

== Pieridae ==
- Cabbage white, Pieris rapae
- West Virginia white, Pieris virginiensis
- Checkered white, Pontia protodice
- Falcate orangetip, Anthocharis midea
- Olympia marble, Euchloe olympia
- Clouded sulphur, Colias philodice
- Orange sulphur, Colias eurytheme
- Pink-edged sulphur, Colias interior
- Sleepy orange, Abaeis nicippe
- Little yellow, Eurema lisa
- Cloudless sulphur, Phoebis sennae

== Lycaenidae ==
=== Lycaenini ===
- American copper, Lycaena phlaeas
- Harvester, Feniseca tarquinius
- Bog copper, Lycaena epixanthe
- Bronze copper, Lycaena hyllus

=== Theclini & Eumaeini ===
- Gray hairstreak, Strymon melinus
- White M hairstreak, Parrhasius m-album
- Banded hairstreak, Satyrium calanus
- Hickory hairstreak, Satyrium caryaevorus
- Edward's hairstreak, Satyrium edwardsii
- King's hairstreak, Satyrium kingi
- Striped hairstreak, Satyrium liparops
- Northern oak hairstreak, Satyrium favonius ontario
- Coral hairstreak, Satyrium titus
- Red-banded hairstreak, Calycopis cecrops
- Brown elfin, Callophrys augustinus
- Henry's elfin, Callophrys henrici
- Frosted elfin, Callophrys irus
- Hoary elfin, Callophrys polios
- Eastern pine elfin, Callophrys niphon
- Great purple hairstreak, Atlides halesus
- Juniper hairstreak, Callophrys gryneus
- Hessel's hairstreak, Callophrys hesseli
- Early hairstreak, Erora laeta

=== Polyommatini ===
- Eastern tail-blue, Cupido comyntas
- Silvery blue, Glaucopsyche lygdamus
- Appalachian azure, Celastrina neglectamajor
- Dusky azure, Celastrina nigra

== Riodinidae ==
- Little metalmark, Calephelis virginiensis
- Northern metalmark, Calephelis borealis

== Nymphalidae ==
=== Heliconiinae ===
- Variegated fritillary, Euptoieta claudia
- Greater spangled fritillary, Speyeria cybele
- Aphrodite fritillary, Speyeria aphrodite
- Meadow fritillary, Boloria bellona
- Silver-bordered fritillary, Boloria selene

=== Nymphalinae ===
- Pearl crescent, Phyciodes tharos
- Phaon crescent, Phyciodes phaon
- Silvery checkerspot, Chlosyne nycteis
- Baltimore checkerspot, Euphydryas phaeton
- Question mark, Polygonia interrogationis
- Eastern comma, Polygonia comma
- Gray comma, Polygonia progne
- Compton tortoiseshell, Nymphalis vaualbum
- Milbert's tortoiseshell, Aglais milberti
- Mourning cloak, Nymphalis antiopa
- Red admiral, Vanessa atalanta
- American lady, Vanessa virginiensis
- Painted lady, Vanessa cardui
- Common buckeye, Junonia coenia
- Red-spotted purple, Limenitis arthemis
- Viceroy, Limenitis archippus
- Hackberry emperor, Asterocampa celtis
- Tawny emperor, Asterocampa clyton
- American snout, Libytheana carinenta
- Monarch, Danaus plexippus
- Queen, Danaus gilippus

=== Satyrinae ===
- Little wood-satyr, Megisto cymela
- Carolina satyr, Hermeuptychia sosybius
- Common wood-nymph, Cercyonis pegala
- Appalachian brown, Satyrodes appalachia
- Northern pearly-eye, Enodia anthedon

== Hesperiidae ==
=== Pyrginae & Pyrrhopyginae ===
- Silver-spotted skipper, Epargyreus clarus
- Golden banded-skipper, Autochton cellus
- Hoary Edge, Achalarus lyciades
- Southern cloudywing, Thorybes bathyllus
- Northern cloudywing, Thorybes pylades
- Confused cloudywing, Thorybes confusis
- Long-tailed skipper, Urbanus proteus
- Juvenal's duskywing, Erynnis juvenalis
- Horace's duskywing, Erynnis horatius
- Dreamy duskywing, Erynnis icelus
- Sleepy duskywing, Erynnis brizo
- Wild indigo duskywing, Erynnis baptisiae
- Columbine duskywing, Erynnis lucilius
- Mottled duskywing, Erynnis martialis
- Common checkered-skipper, Pyrgus communis
- Hayhurst's scallopwing, Staphylus hayhurstii
- Common sootywing, Pholisora catullus

=== Heteropterinae & Hesperiinae ===
- Fiery skipper, Hylephila phyleus
- Sachem, Atalopedes campestris
- European skipper, Thymelicus lineola
- Least skipper, Ancyloxypha numitor
- Clouded skipper, Lerema accius
- Swarthy skipper, Nastra lherminier
- Cobweb skipper, Hesperia metea
- Leonard's skipper, Hesperia leonardus
- Indian skipper, Hesperia sassacus
- Long dash, Polites mystic
- Peck's skipper, Polites peckius
- Tawny-edged skipper, Polites themistocles
- Crossline skipper, Polites origenes
- Black dash, Euphyes conspicua
- Southern broken-dash, Wallengrenia otho
- Northern broken-dash, Wallengrenia egeremet
- Little glassywing, Pompeius verna
- Dun skipper, Euphyes vestris
- Hobomok skipper, Poanes hobomok
- Zabulon skipper, Poanes zabulon
- Mulberry wing, Poanes massasoit
- Broad-winged skipper, Poanes viator
- Aaron's skipper, Poanes aaroni
- Two-spotted skipper, Euphyes bimacula
- Dion skipper, Euphyes dion
- Delaware skipper, Anatrytone logan
- Rare skipper, Problema bulenta
- Dusted skipper, Atrytonopsis hianna
- Common roadside-skipper, Amblyscirtes vialis
- Pepper and salt skipper, Amblyscirtes hegon
- Ocola skipper, Panoquina ocola
- Salt marsh skipper, Panoquina panoquin
