= List of butterflies of Iowa =

This is a list of butterflies that are found in Iowa.

- Achalarus lyciades
- Aglais milberti
- Agraulis vanillae
- Anaea andria
- Asterocampa celtis
- Asterocampa clyton
- Battus philenor
- Boloria bellona
- Boloria selene
- Celotes nessus
- Chlosyne gorgone
- Chlosyne nycteis
- Danaus gilippus
- Danaus plexippus
- Epargyreus clarus
- Erynnis baptisiae
- Erynnis brizo
- Erynnis horatius
- Erynnis icelus
- Erynnis juvenalis
- Erynnis lucilius
- Erynnis martialis
- Erynnis persius
- Euphydryas phaeton
- Euptoieta claudia
- Eurytides marcellus
- Feniseca tarquinius
- Junonia coenia
- Libytheana carinenta
- Limenitis archippus
- Limenitis arthemis
- Limenitis arthemis arthemis
- Limenitis arthemis astyanax
- Mestra amymone
- Nymphalis antiopa
- Nymphalis californica
- Papilio cresphontes
- Papilio glaucus
- Papilio polyxenes
- Papilio troilus
- Pholisora catullus
- Phyciodes batesii
- Phyciodes tharos
- Polygonia comma
- Polygonia faunus
- Polygonia progne
- Pyrgus communis
- Speyeria aphrodite
- Speyeria atlantis
- Speyeria cybele
- Speyeria idalia
- Staphylus hayhurstii
- Thorybes bathyllus
- Vanessa atalanta
- Vanessa cardui
- Vanessa virginiensis
