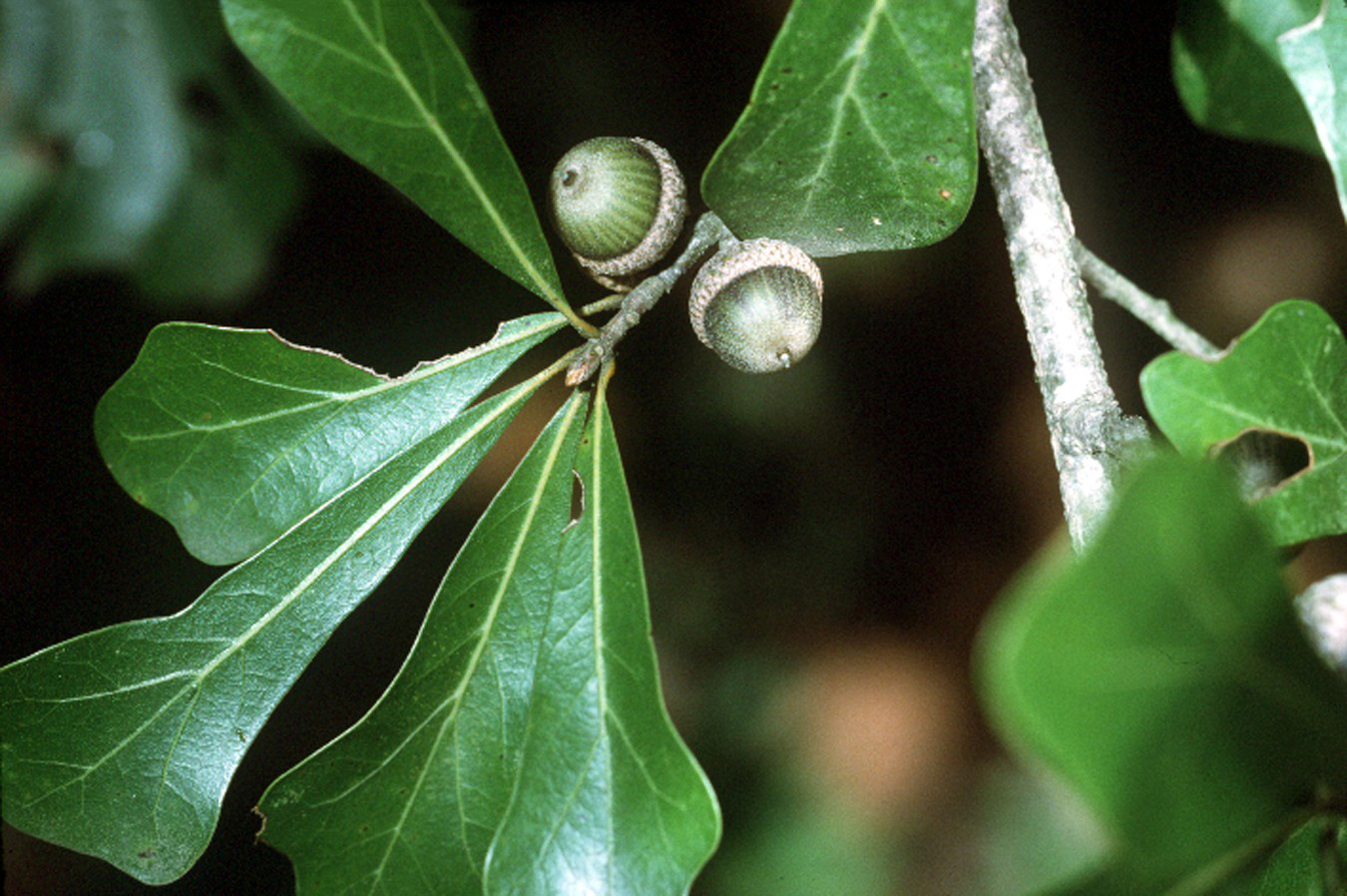
- Leaves and acorns

Conservation status
- Least Concern (IUCN 3.1)

Scientific classification
- Kingdom: Plantae
- Clade: Embryophytes
- Clade: Tracheophytes
- Clade: Spermatophytes
- Clade: Angiosperms
- Clade: Eudicots
- Clade: Rosids
- Order: Fagales
- Family: Fagaceae
- Genus: Quercus
- Subgenus: Quercus subg. Quercus
- Section: Quercus sect. Lobatae
- Species: Q. nigra

Binomial name
- Quercus nigra L.
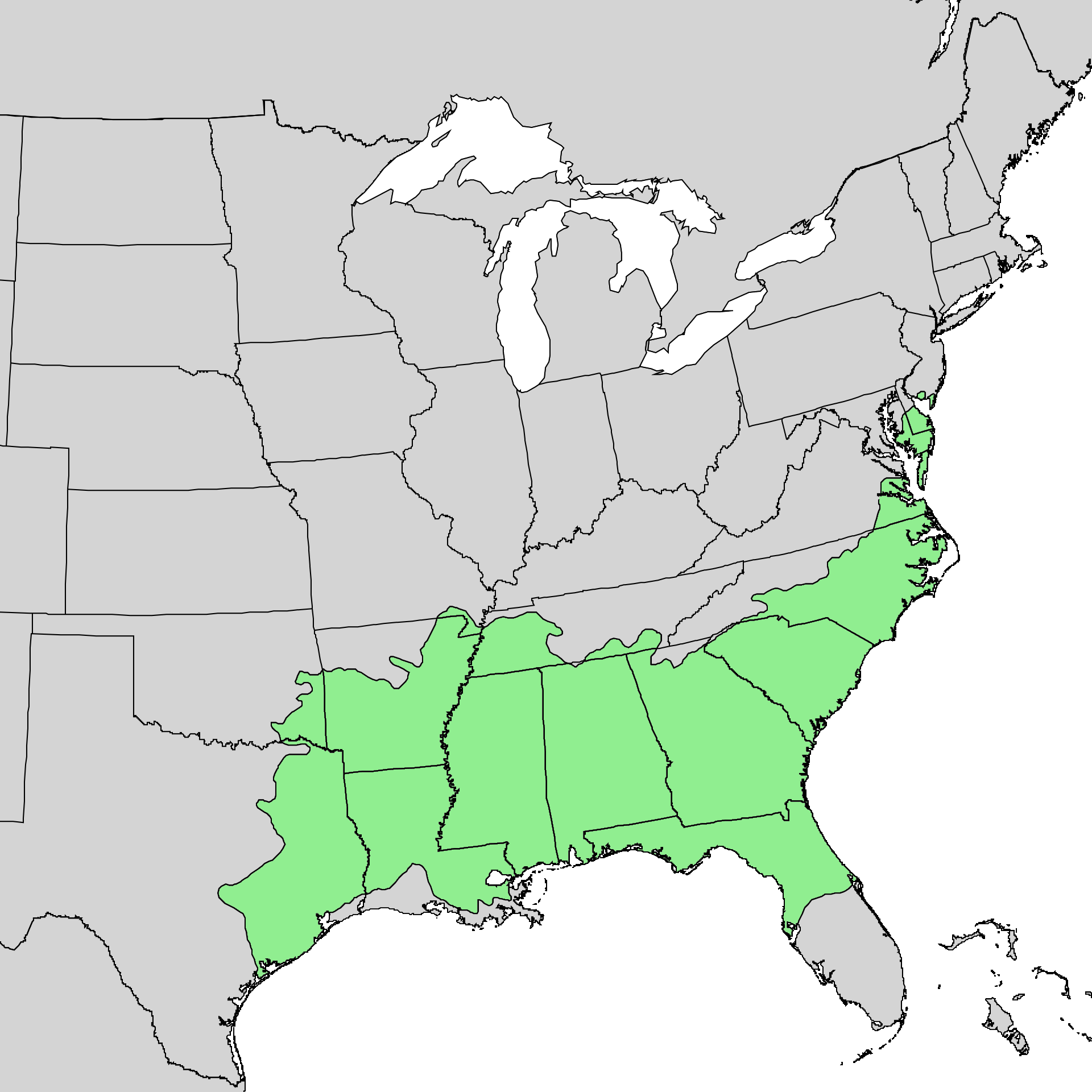
- Natural range

Synonyms
- List: Quercus agnostifolia K.Koch; Quercus aquatica (Lam.) Walter; Quercus bumelifolia Riddell; Quercus dentata Bartram; Quercus genabii K.Koch; Quercus marylandica Du Roi; Quercus microcarya Small; Quercus nana Willd.; Quercus noviorleani Petz. & G.Kirchn.; Quercus quinqueloba Engelm.; Quercus uliginosa Wangenh.

= Quercus nigra =

Water oak

Species of oak tree

Quercus nigra, the water oak, is an oak in the red oak group (Quercus sect. Lobatae), native to the eastern and south-central United States, found in all the coastal states from New Jersey to Texas, and inland as far as Oklahoma, Kentucky, and southern Missouri. It occurs in lowlands and up to 450 meters (1,480 feet) in elevation.

Other names include spotted oak, duck oak, punk oak, orange oak, and possum oak.

== Description ==
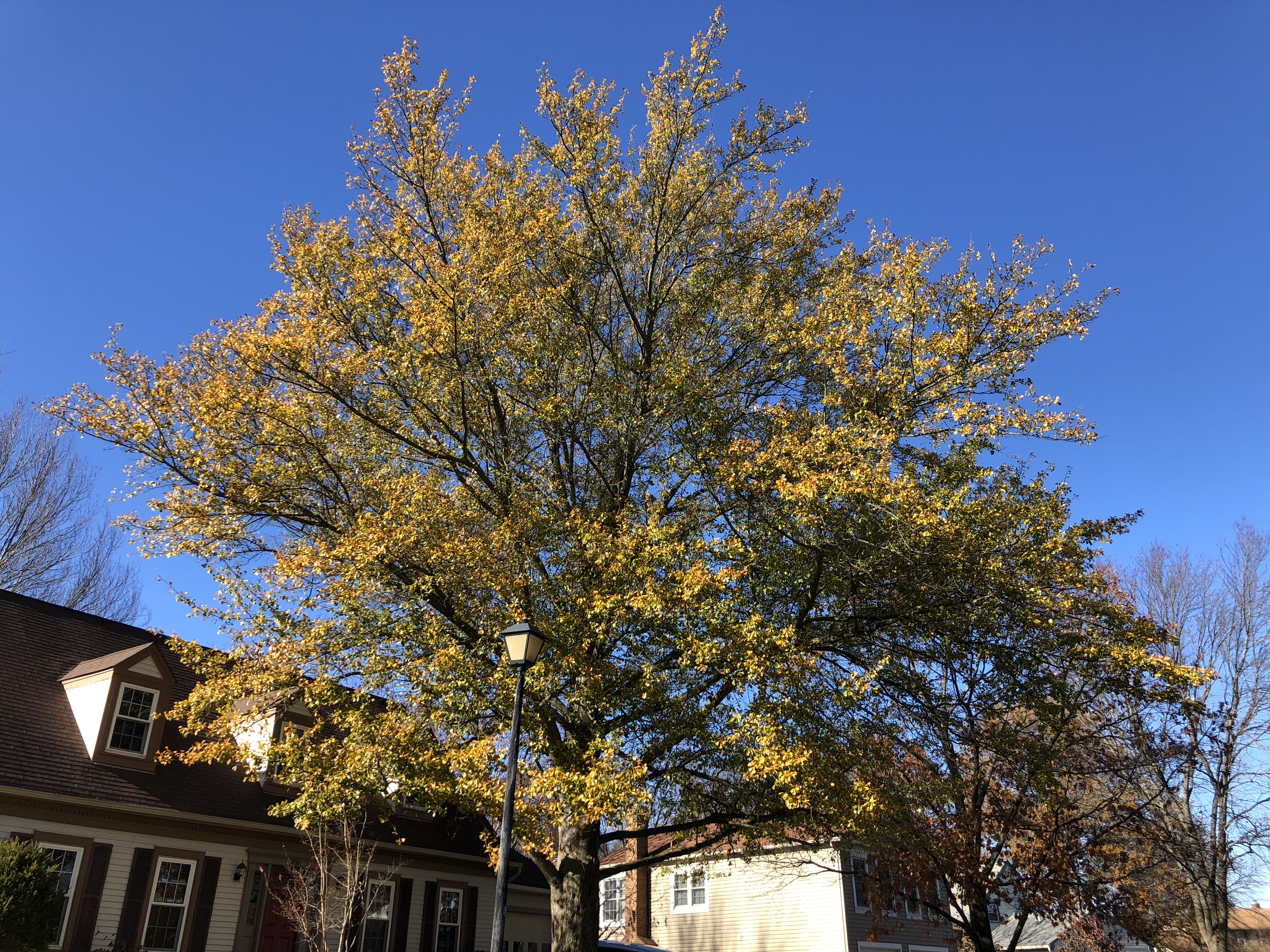
Water Oak turning yellow in late autumn

Quercus nigra is a medium-sized deciduous tree, growing up to 30 meters (98 feet) tall with a trunk up to 1 m (3 ft 3 in) in diameter. Young trees have a smooth, brown bark that becomes gray-black with rough scaly ridges as the tree matures. The leaves are alternate, simple and tardily deciduous, remaining on the tree until mid-winter; they are 3–12 centimeters (1 1/4–4 3/4 inches) long and 2–6 cm (3/4–2 1/4 in) broad, variable in shape, most commonly shaped like a spatula being broad and rounded at the top and narrow and wedged at the base. The margins vary, usually being smooth to shallowly lobed, with a bristle at the apex and lobe tips. The tree is easy to identify by the leaves, which have a lobe that looks as if a drop of water is hanging from the end of the leaf. The top of each leaf is a dull green to bluish green and the bottom is a paler bluish-green. On the bottom portion of the leaves, rusty colored hairs run along the veins. The acorns are arranged singly or in pairs, 10–14 millimeters (3/8–1/2 in) long and broad, with a shallow cupule; they mature about 18 months after pollination in autumn of the second year.

== Ecology ==
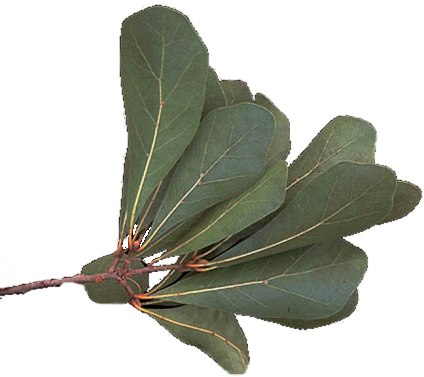
Water oak leaf cluster

Water oak serves the same ecological role as weeping willow and other wetland trees. It is adapted to wet, swampy areas, such as along ponds and stream banks, but can also tolerate well-drained sites and even heavy, compacted soils. It grows in sandy soils, red clays, and old fields to the borders of swamps, streams, to bottomlands. Due to its ability to grow and reproduce quickly, the water oak is often the most abundant species in a stand of trees. The tree is relatively short-lived compared to other oaks and may live only 60 to 80 years. It does not compete well and does not tolerate even light shade. Water oak is frequently used to restore bottomland hardwood forests on land that was previously cleared for agriculture or pine plantations. Minimum age for flowering and fruiting is 20 years and the tree produces heavy crops of acorns nearly every year. Water oak is not recommended as an ornamental due to being short-lived, disease-prone, and extremely messy.

Hybrids of water oak are known with southern red oak (Quercus falcata), bluejack oak (Quercus incana), turkey oak (Quercus laevis), blackjack oak (Quercus marilandica), willow oak (Quercus phellos), Shumard oak (Quercus shumardii), and black oak (Quercus velutina).

Water oak acorns are an important food for white-tailed deer, eastern gray squirrel, raccoon, wild turkey, mallard, wood duck, and bobwhite quail. In winter, deer will browse the buds and young twigs. This tree, like all oak species, is a keystone species. If free of pesticides, it can provide food for many lepidopteran larvae, including those of the imperial moth (Eacles imperialis), banded hairstreak (Satyrium calanus), Edward's hairstreak (Satyrium edwardsii), gray hairstreak (Strymon melinus), white M hairstreak (Parrhasius m-album), Horace's duskywing (Erynnis horatius), and Juvenal's duskywing (Erynnis juvenalis).

== Uses ==
Water oak has been used for timber and for fuel by people in the southern states since the 17th century.
