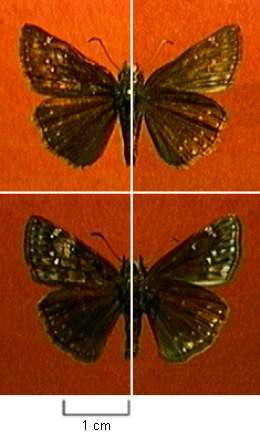

Scientific classification
- Domain: Eukaryota
- Kingdom: Animalia
- Phylum: Arthropoda
- Class: Insecta
- Order: Lepidoptera
- Family: Hesperiidae
- Genus: Erynnis
- Species: E. afranius

Binomial name
- Erynnis afranius (Lintner, 1878)

Synonyms
- Nisoniades afranius Lintner, 1878; Thanaos afranius Godman & Salvin, [1899]

= Erynnis afranius =

Afranius duskywing

Species of butterfly

Erynnis afranius, also known as the afranius duskywing or bald duskywing, is a species of butterfly of the family Hesperiidae. It is found from northern Mexico through the central United States to southern Canada in the provinces of Alberta, Saskatchewan and Manitoba.

The wingspan is 25–31 mm. There can be two generations from mid-May to late August.

The larvae feed on Lupinus species, Lotus species and Thermopsis rhombifolia.
