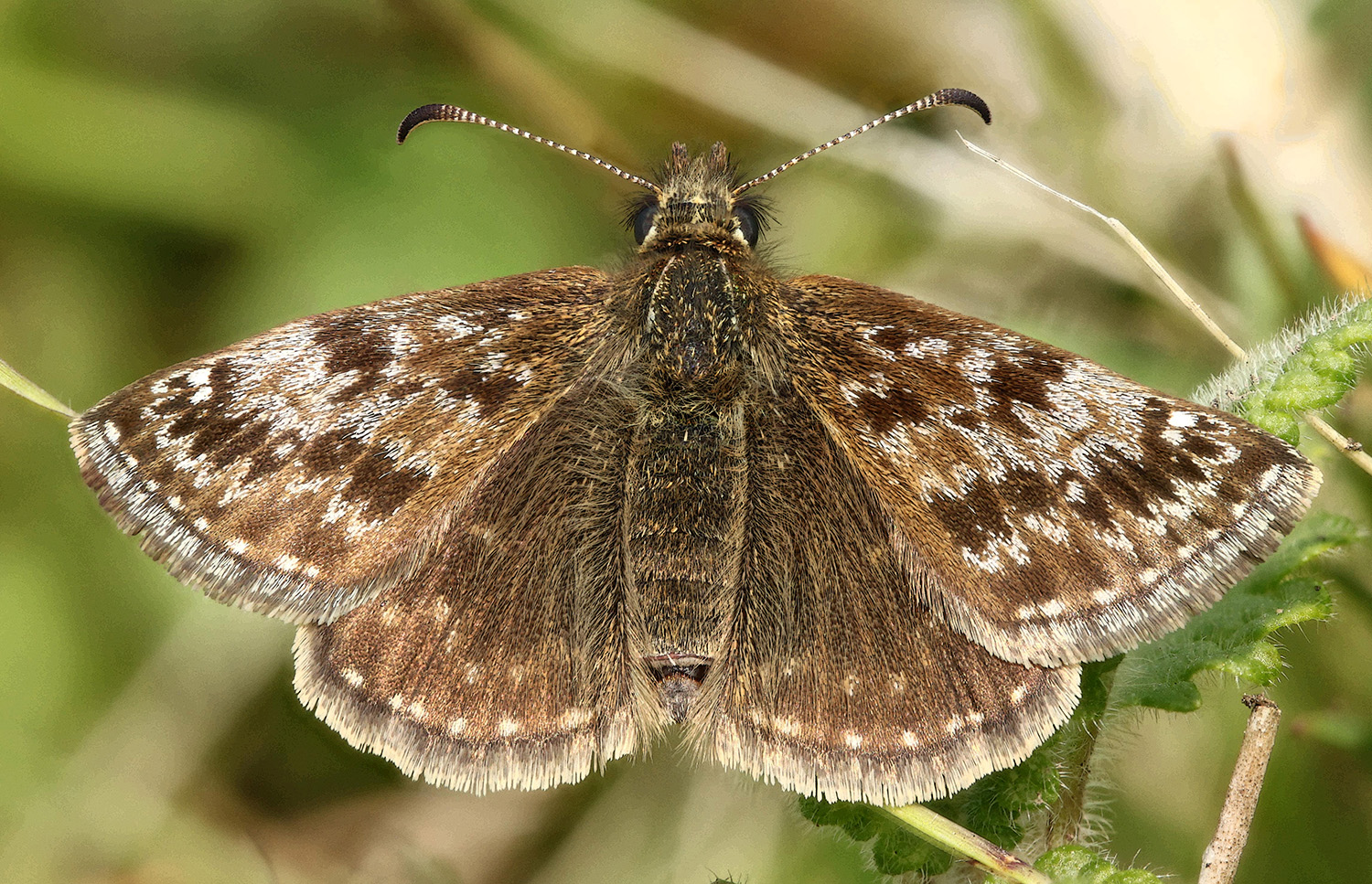
- Erynnis tages

Scientific classification
- Kingdom: Animalia
- Phylum: Arthropoda
- Clade: Pancrustacea
- Class: Insecta
- Order: Lepidoptera
- Family: Hesperiidae
- Tribe: Erynnini
- Genus: Erynnis; Schrank, 1801

= Duskywing =

Duskywings

Genus of butterflies

Erynnis is a genus in the skippers butterfly family Hesperiidae, known as the duskywings. Erynnis is found in the Neotropical realm and across the Palearctic, but the highest species diversity is in the Nearctic. The genus was erected by Franz von Paula Schrank in 1801.

== Species and notable subspecies ==
Listed alphabetically:

- Erynnis afranius (Lintner, 1878) – Afranius duskywing
- Erynnis baptisiae (Forbes, 1936) – wild indigo duskywing
- Erynnis brizo (Boisduval & LeConte, [1837]) – sleepy duskywing
  - Erynnis brizo burgessi (Skinner, 1914) – Rocky Mountain sleepy duskywing
- Erynnis funeralis (Scudder & Burgess, 1870) – funereal duskywing
- Erynnis horatius (Scudder & Burgess, 1870) – Horace's duskywing
- Erynnis icelus (Scudder & Burgess, 1870) – dreamy duskywing
- Erynnis juvenalis (Fabricius, 1793) – Juvenal's duskywing
- Erynnis lucilius (Scudder & Burgess, 1870) – columbine duskywing
- Erynnis martialis (Scudder, 1869) – mottled duskywing
- Erynnis marloyi (Boisduval, [1834]) – inky skipper
- Erynnis mercurius (Dyar, 1926) Mexico
- Erynnis montana (Bremer, 1861) South China, Formosa, Amur, Japan
- Erynnis meridianus Bell, 1927 – meridian duskywing – California, Nevada, Arizona, New Mexico
- Erynnis pacuvius (Lintner, [1878]) – Pacuvius duskywing, Dyar's duskywing, or buckthorn dusky wing
  - Erynnis pacuvius callidus (Grinnell, 1905) – Californian – Pacuvius duskywing
- Erynnis pathan Evans, 1949 Ghissar, Chitral, North Baluchistan
- Erynnis pelias (Leech, 1891) West China, Arunachal Pradesh
- Erynnis persius (Scudder, 1863) – Persius duskywing or hairy duskywing
  - Erynnis persius fredericki (H. A. Freeman, 1943) – eastern Persius duskywing
- Erynnis popoviana Nordmann, 1851 Mongolia, North China, East China, Central China, Ussuri
- Erynnis propertius (Scudder & Burgess, 1870) – Propertius duskywing or western oak duskywing
- Erynnis scudderi (Skinner, 1914) – Scudder's duskywing – Mexico, Arizona
- Erynnis tages (Linnaeus, 1758) – dingy skipper
- Erynnis telemachus Burns, 1960 – Rocky Mountain duskywing – Arizona
- Erynnis tristis (Boisduval 1852) – mournful duskywing – Arizona, California, New Mexico, Texas, Mexico to Colombia, Central America
  - Erynnis tristis tatius (W. H. Edwards, 1882) – Tatius duskywing – Arizona, Mexico, Guatemala, Costa Rica, Panama, to Colombia
- Erynnis zarucco (H. Lucas, 1857) – zarucco duskywing
