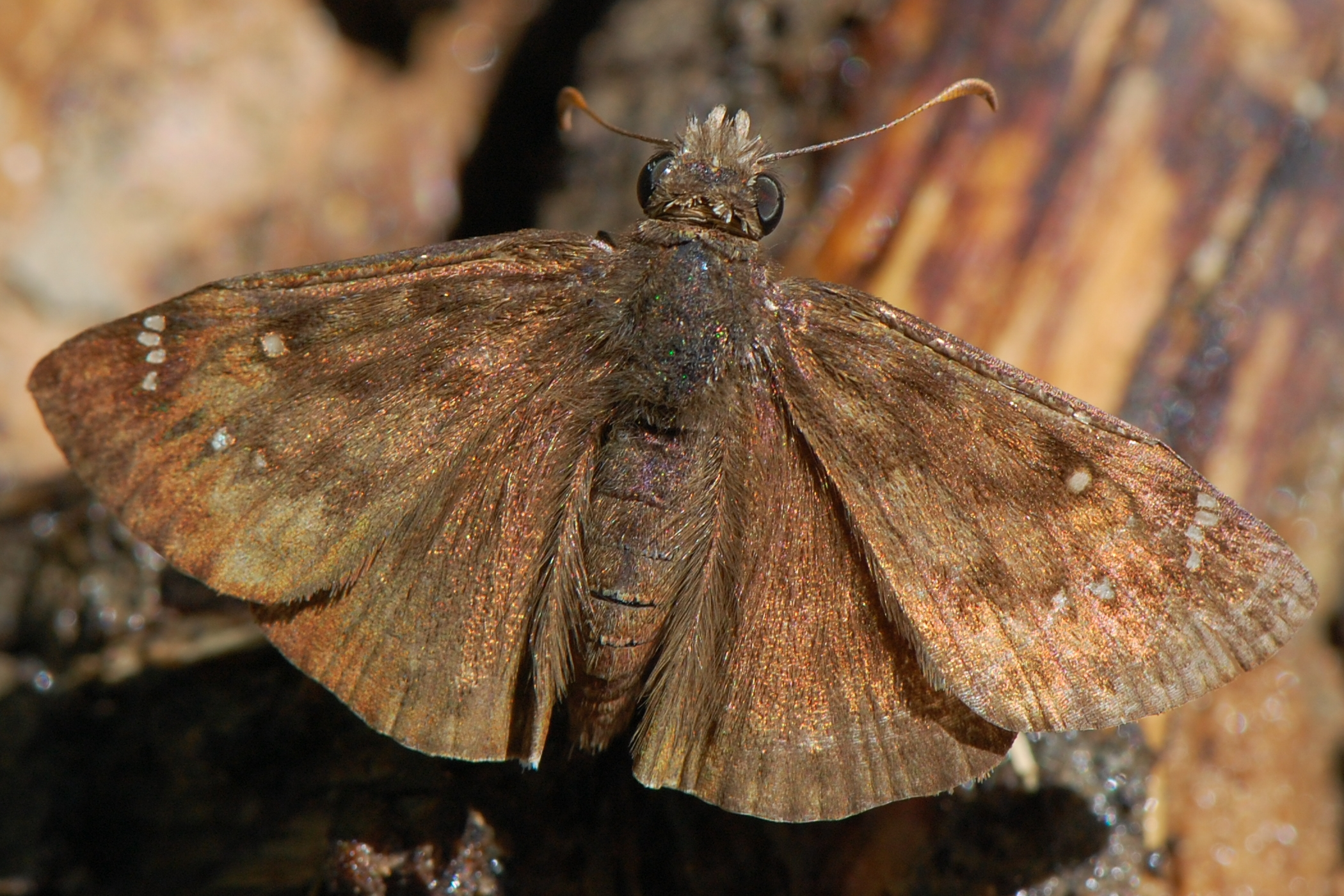

Scientific classification
- Domain: Eukaryota
- Kingdom: Animalia
- Phylum: Arthropoda
- Class: Insecta
- Order: Lepidoptera
- Family: Hesperiidae
- Genus: Erynnis
- Species: E. pacuvius

Binomial name
- Erynnis pacuvius (Lintner, 1878)

Synonyms
- Nisoniades pacuvius Lintner, 1878; Thanaos pacuvius Godman & Salvin, [1899]

= Erynnis pacuvius =

Pacuvius duskywing

Species of butterfly

Erynnis pacuvius, also known as Pacuvius duskywing, Dyar's duskywing or buckthorn dusky wing, is a species of skipper butterfly in the family Hesperiidae. It is found in southern British Columbia and in most of the western United States.

The wingspan is 29–33 mm. The flight period is between June and July in the north with a second generation in the south.

The larvae feed on Ceanothus species.
