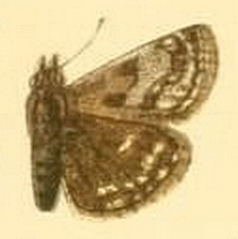

Scientific classification
- Domain: Eukaryota
- Kingdom: Animalia
- Phylum: Arthropoda
- Class: Insecta
- Order: Lepidoptera
- Family: Hesperiidae
- Genus: Erynnis
- Species: E. popoviana

Binomial name
- Erynnis popoviana Nordmann, 1851

= Erynnis popoviana =

Species of butterfly

Erynnis popoviana is a small species of skipper butterfly in the family Hesperiidae. It is found in the eastern Palearctic (Mongolia, North China, East China, Central China, Ussuri).

== Description from Seitz ==
popoviana Nordm. (= sinina Gr.-Grsh.) (86 c) is hardly more than a synonym [of tages]; light grey, with a row of white marginal dots and a second similar row in the centre, the hindwing with a light discocellular spot.

== See also ==
- List of butterflies of Russia
