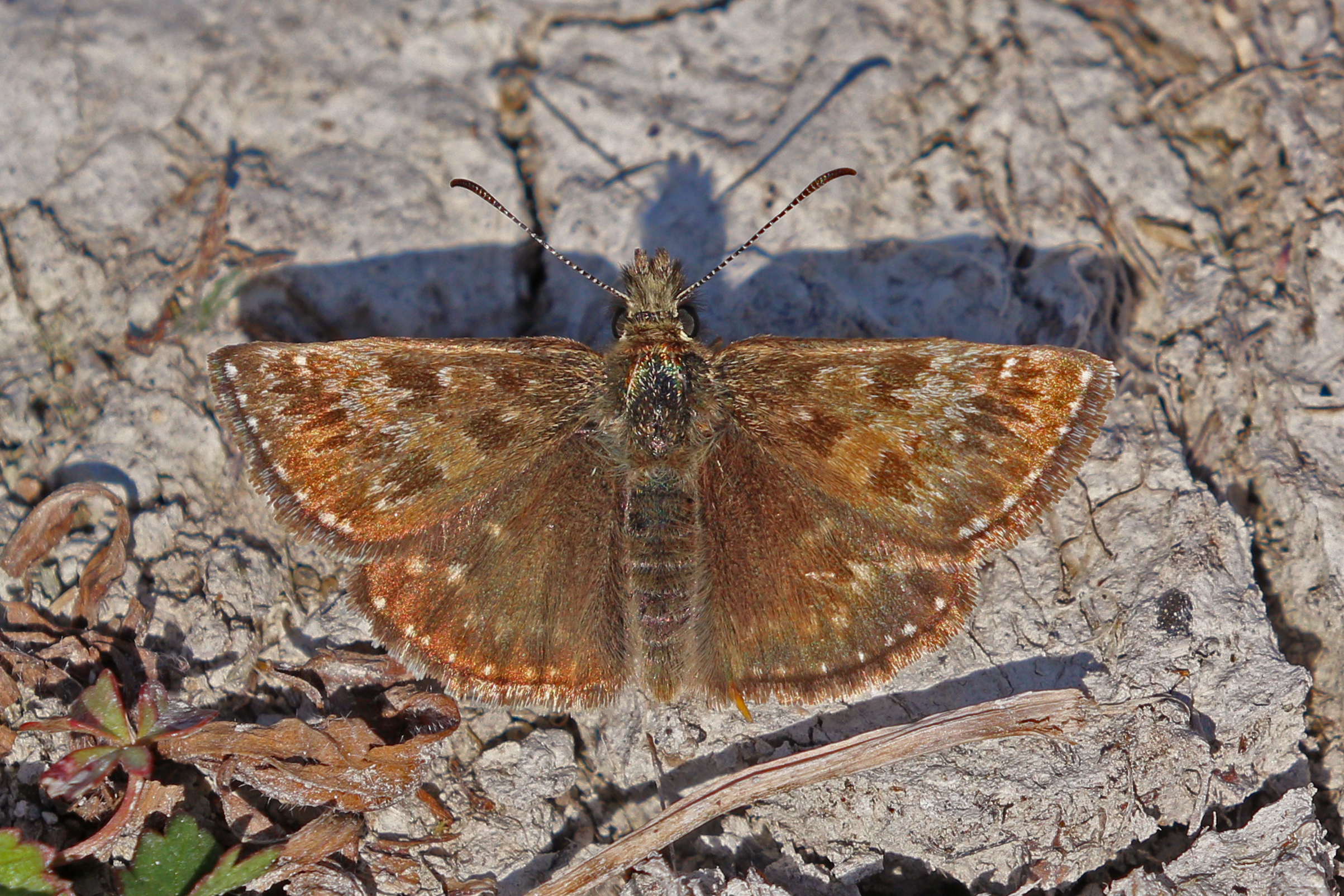
- Male, Buckinghamshire, England
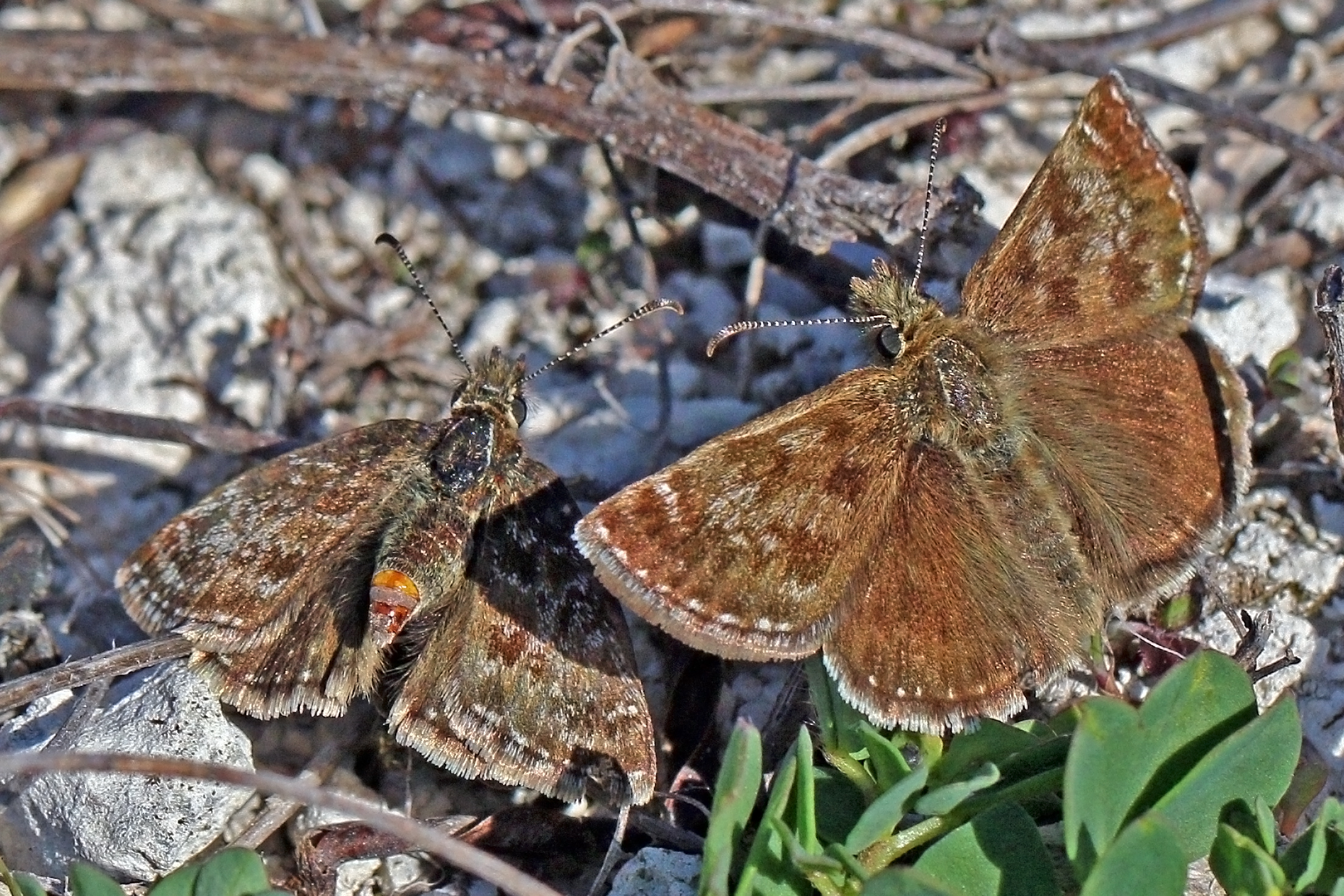
- Courting

Scientific classification
- Kingdom: Animalia
- Phylum: Arthropoda
- Clade: Pancrustacea
- Class: Insecta
- Order: Lepidoptera
- Family: Hesperiidae
- Genus: Erynnis
- Species: E. tages

Binomial name
- Erynnis tages (Linnaeus, 1758)

= Dingy skipper =

Species of butterfly

The dingy skipper (Erynnis tages) is a species of butterfly in the family Hesperiidae.

== Description ==
Erynnis tages is different from other skippers because of the predominantly monochrome, gray-brown wing coloration and the marbling, which is only present on the upper side of the forewings, as well as a series of small white dots on the wing edge. It is probably the most moth-like British butterfly and normally rests with its wings in a moth-like fashion. This well-camouflaged, brown and grey butterfly can be confused with the grizzled skipper, the Mother Shipton moth or the burnet companion moth. Faded specimens of Carcharodus alceae are distinguished by glass spots in the forewing and by a jagged rear wing edge. A special feature is the restraint of the imagos, which is reminiscent of a deltoid moth with its roof-shaped wings placed one on top of the other.

== Description in Seitz ==
Th. tages L. (86 c). Forewing grey-brown, with two oblique black bands, which are proximally edged with yellowish grey. A marginal row of small light dots and two apical dots, of which one is transparent. Hindwing black, in quite normal specimens without spots. Throughout Europe and Northern Asia to the Amur. ab. clarus [Caradja, 1895 ab.] are very pale specimens, which may occur everywhere among true tages. — popoviana Nordm. (= sinina Gr.-Grsh.) [now species Erynnis popoviana] (86 c) is hardly more than a synonym; light grey, with a row of white marginal dots and second similar row in the centre, the hindwing with a light discocellular spot. Dauria. Amur, China. — unicolor Frr. [ now subspecies] (86 c) is uniformly brown grey without any markings, Greece and Asia Minor. — cervantes Grasl.[now E. tages ssp. cervantes Graslin, 1836 ] (86 d). Larger and much darker than true tages. The dark bands obsolete or only indicated by black streaks: the marginal dots scarcely visible. South Spain. — Larva green with the head brown and yellow lateral stripe dotted with black: on Eryngium and Lotus, in July and late in the autumn. Pupa green, with reddish abdomen. The butterflies in April and May and again from July onward, everywhere plentiful. They fly low above the ground and like to settle on roads.

== Taxonomy ==
Subspecies are little defined and include E. t. unicolor Freyer, 1852 found in Transcaucasia and E. t. baynesi found in the Burren, County Clare, Ireland.

Synonyms: Erynnis morio SCOPOLI, 1763; Erynnis geryon ROTTEMBURG, 1775

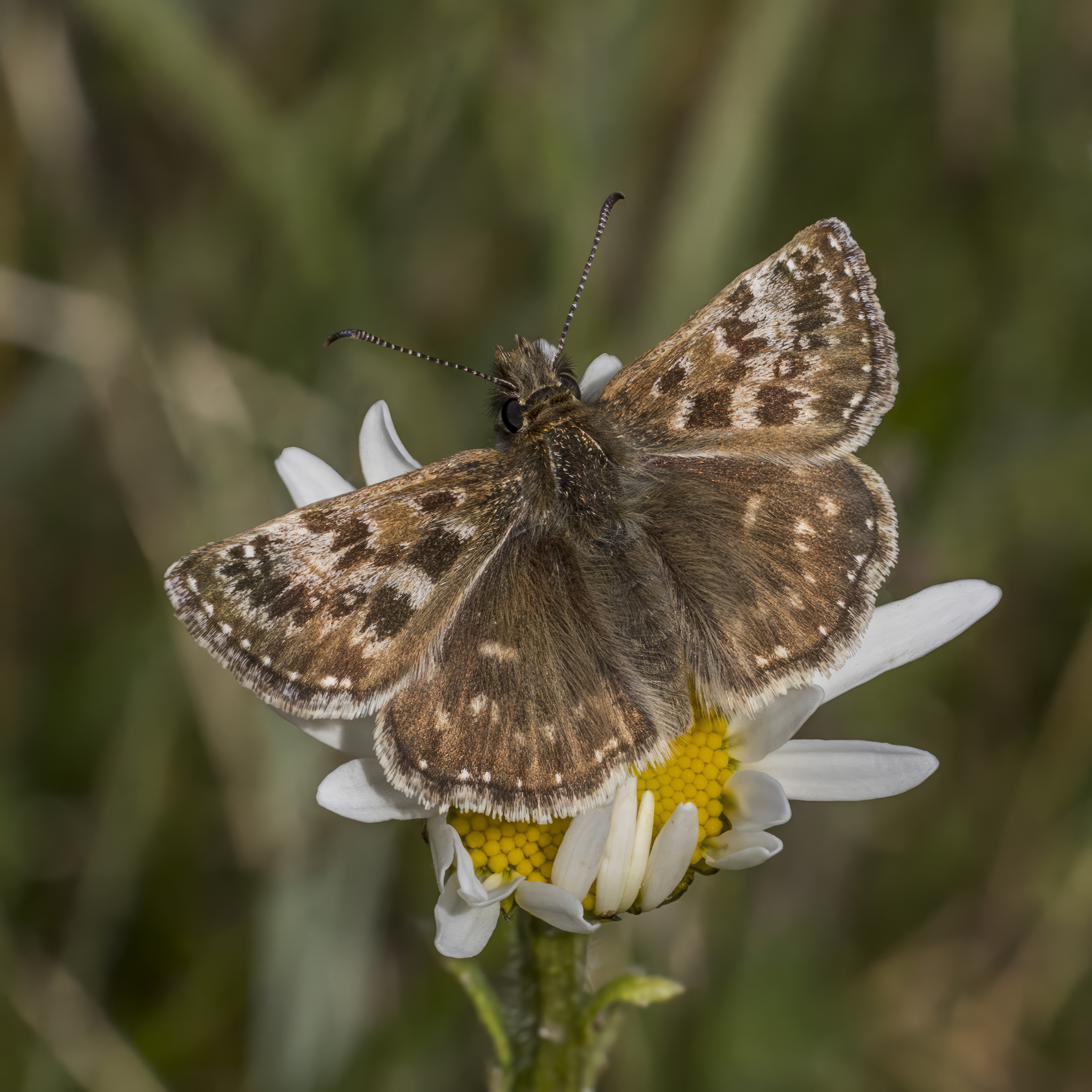
Male E. t. baynesi
County Clare, Ireland

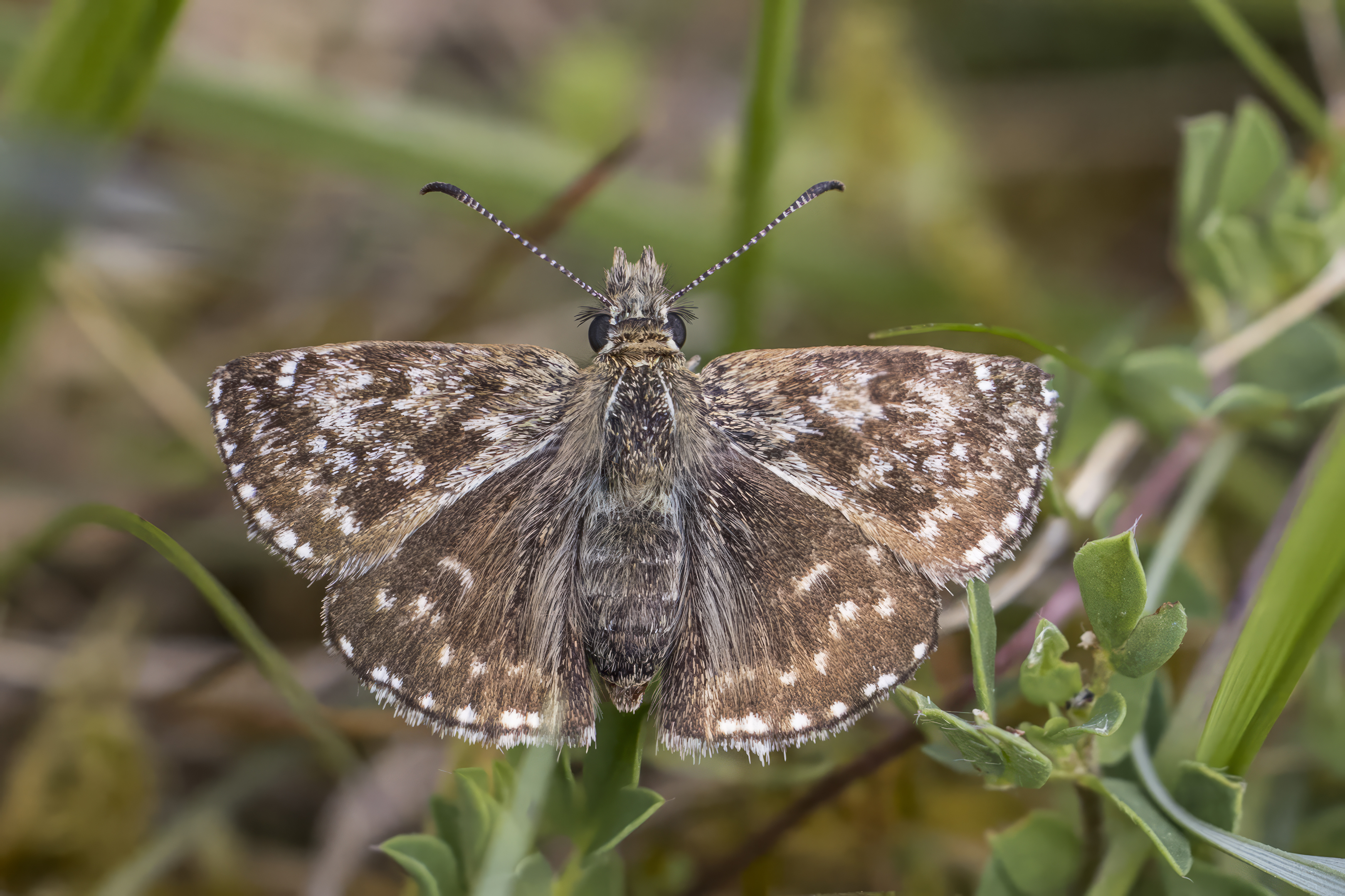
Female E. t. baynesi
County Clare, Ireland

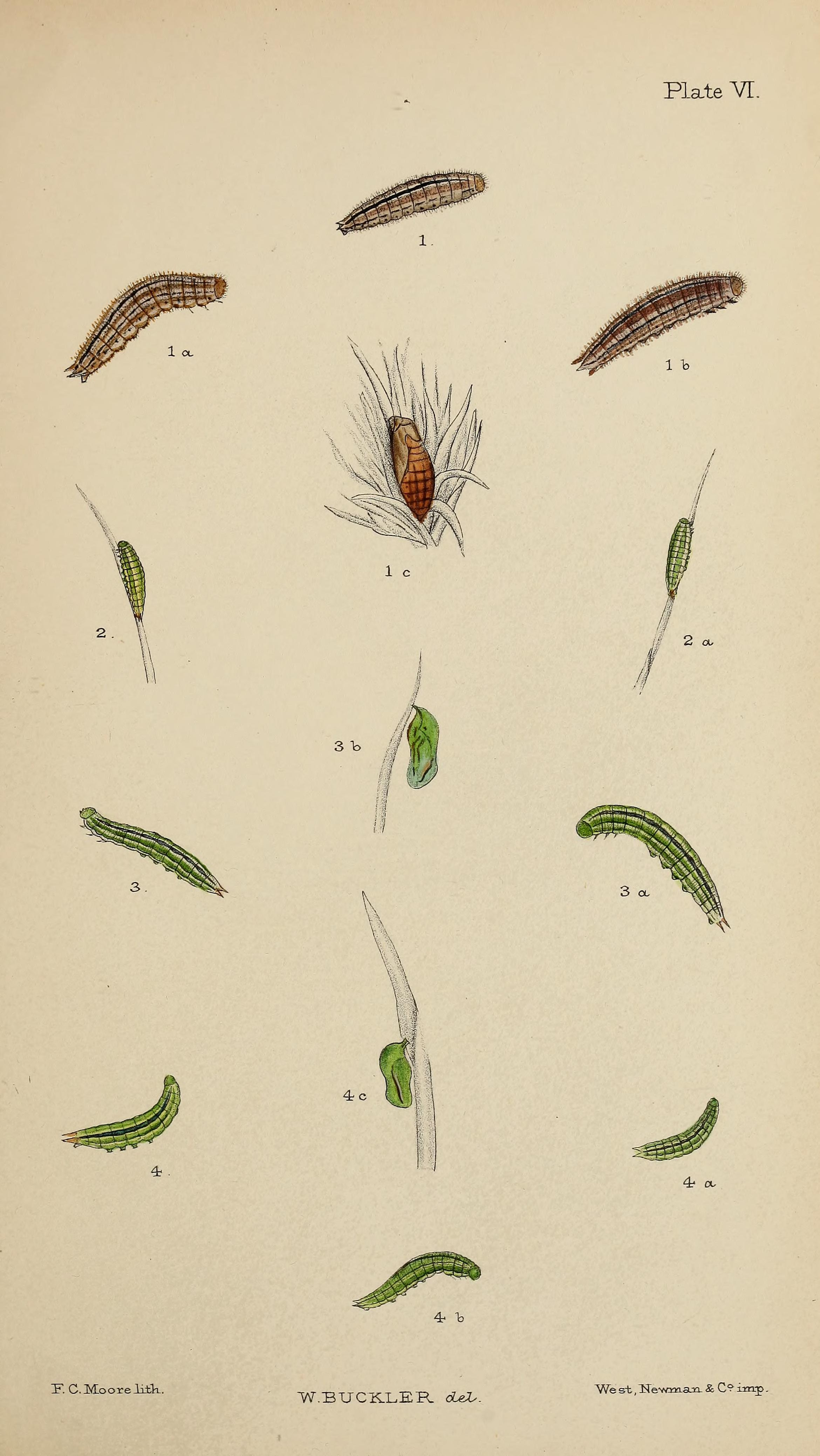
Figs 3 larva after 2nd moult 3a larva after 3rd moult 3b, 3c larva after 4th moult

== Range ==
The dingy skipper is widespread from the Iberian Peninsula and Ireland in the west to the Pacific in East Asia. In the north, the area boundary follows roughly the 62°N. In Asia, the species penetrates south across the Caucasus to Pakistan, and in China the area boundary is far to the south. In Bavaria, the distribution shows a noticeable change from more or less densely populated areas to regions in which the species is absent over long stretches. In southern Bavaria, the species is concentrated in the Alpine region, the valleys of the Alpine rivers, in particular the Lech and Isar, as well as the areas near the river in the Donaumoos. In Northern Bavaria, the focus is on the Franconian Alb, in parts of the Franconian Keuper-Lias-Land and the Mainfränkische Platten. A secondary focus in the Upper Main hill country leads to scattered evidence along the northeastern border. Here the species occurs from the Vogtland over the Fichtelgebirge to the Upper Palatinate and Bavarian Forest. With the exception of the East Bavarian low mountain range, the occurrence of the dingy skipper coincides with the distribution of limestone areas (Jura and Muschelkalk) or geological features (basalt, gypsum, basic sandstones such as dolomitic arkose). It is widely but patchily distributed across Britain. It occurs further north than any other skipper in Scotland with some isolated colonies in the Inverness region. It is also one of the two skippers to be found in Ireland, again with a patchy distribution but the main strongholds along the western side. It is on the decline in several European countries including the UK and Armenia.

== Habitat ==
Erynnis tages favours open grassy habitats up to 2,000 metres above sea level. A variety of habitats are used including chalk downland, woodland clearings, coastal dunes, railway lines and waste ground.

The habitats of the dingy skipper are mainly dry and poor grasslands. Extensive grassland with one or two-tier meadows and pastures as well as habitats with little vegetation with raw soil and initial plant communities are also regularly populated. In forests, the imagos fly in very sparse wooded stands or on forest meadows, on the edges of paths and forest edges. The species is also found in fens. Suitable habitats are disturbances such as paths with a dry, warm microclimate.

== Ecology ==
The imagos fly in two generations from May-June and July-August but in northern regions and at the high altitudes, there is only a single generation. The flight period in Bavaria extends from the middle of April to the beginning of September with a focus from the beginning of May to the end of June and a maximum in the last May decade. First and second generation overlap. The second generation, which occurs only irregularly or regionally, is always significantly weaker.

The imagos prefer low-growing or very patchy vegetation and often stay on bare ground to sunbathe or to absorb moisture and minerals. On the ground or on low plants, the males also move from perch in order to track down the females by approaching insects of suitable size. The flight is usually very fast and low, whereby the locally loyal imagos usually only cover short distances of a few meters and soon settle again.

There is very little information on flower visits. In Bavaria out of a total of 14 listed plant species, only three are mentioned several times, in addition to the most important egg-laying plants Hippocrepis comosa and Lotus corniculatus, Ajuga reptans also is visited. Other suction plants are yellow-flowered Fabaceae such as Anthyllis vulneraria, Chamaecytisus ratisbonensis and Medicago falcata as well as blue- and violet-flowered mint flowers such as Salvia pratensis and Thymus spp. Visits to flowers on taller perennials such as Cirsium arvense, Eupatorium cannabinum or Echium vulgare are rare, as the imagos mainly stay near the ground. In addition to visiting flowers, the imagos regularly suckle on moist soil, carrion and excrement.

Eggs are laid individually on the upper side of mostly terminal leaflets near the ground, with gaps or weak-growing, microclimatically favored locations being preferred. Observations of egg laying or of egg and caterpillar finds are only available in isolated cases. The following egg-laying and host plants have been reported from Bavaria: Hippocrepis comosa, Lotus corniculatus, Securigera varia, Tetragonalobus maritimus. Almost all reports relate to observations of oviposition or egg discoveries, only a single detection of an adult caterpillar was found in Lotus corniculatus. In Great Britain eggs were found on the tender young leaves of bird's-foot trefoil (Lotus corniculatus), the favoured food plant here (although horseshoe vetch (Hippocrepis comosa) and greater bird's-foot trefoil (Lotus pendunculatus) are sometimes used). Other larval host plants in Europe are Eryngium, Coronilla, Medicago, etc.

The hemispherical egg with clear longitudinal ribs is initially light yellow and later orange-red in color and is easily recognizable on the green upper side of the leaf with a targeted search. This combination of features results in a further, reliable detection method for the species. During the day, the caterpillar hides in a hiding place made of spun leaves and mainly eats at night. The caterpillar creates a shelter by spinning leaves together and feeds until fully grown in August. It then creates a larger tent to form a hibernaculum where it hibernates. Pupation occurs the following spring without further feeding. The winter web is dense like parchment, so that no water can penetrate. Spun threads in summer, the pupae of which result in second generation butterflies, are of a loose texture.

== Conservation ==
In accordance with its preference for low and gappy vegetation, grazing is particularly suitable for maintaining the habitats, which, in addition to the continuous shortening of the vegetation, also results in the formation of the open ground areas that are essential for the species due to the footfall. Extensive grazing with sheep or cattle must therefore be continued on lime lawns, the most important type of habitat in central Europe. If grazing is not possible on poor grass, mowing can also be considered. There are no restrictions with regard to the time of mowing, as the pre-imaginal stages almost always live close to the ground. For the occurrence in poor meadows, the extensive renouncement of fertilization is necessary for survival. Another contribution to the protection of the species is the preservation of small structures with patchy vegetation on fields, embankments and roadsides. It is essential to avoid the use of suction mowers or mulchers when caring for such structures. The creation of new habitats is also possible in sub-areas of the occurrence, for example on limestone gravel in the valleys of southern Bavaria, since the imagos often colonize anthropogenic secondary sites. Suitable areas are e.g. flood dams, embankments or disused mining sites, which are maintained in a low-growing and gappy state by largely dispensing with planting and corresponding subsequent care.

== Etymology ==
"A grandson of Jupiter"

== See also ==
- List of butterflies of Great Britain
