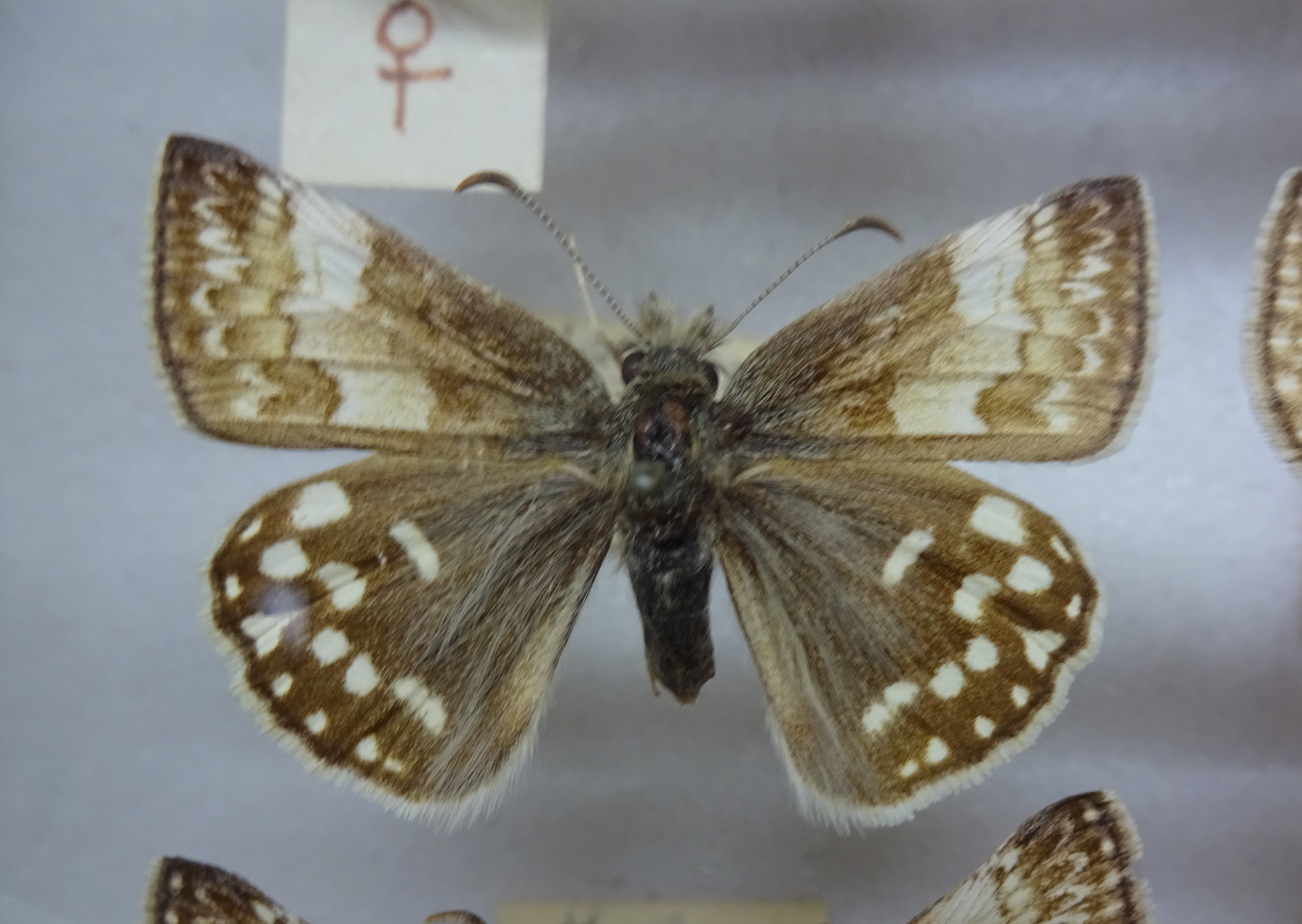

Scientific classification
- Domain: Eukaryota
- Kingdom: Animalia
- Phylum: Arthropoda
- Class: Insecta
- Order: Lepidoptera
- Family: Hesperiidae
- Genus: Erynnis
- Species: E. montana

Binomial name
- Erynnis montana (Bremer, 1861)

Synonyms
- List: Pyrgus montanus Bremer, 1861; Erynnis montanus; Thanaos rusticanus Butler, 1866; Thanaos nigrescens Leech, 1894; Thanaos leechi Elwes & Edwards, 1897

= Erynnis montana =

Species of butterfly

Erynnis montana is a species of Palearctic butterfly in the family Hesperiidae (Pyrginae). It is found in China, eastern Russia (Amur), Taiwan and Japan.

The larva feeds on Quercus mongolica.

== Subspecies ==
- E. m. montana
- E. m. monta Evans, 1948 - China (Yunnan)
- E. m. neomontanus Murayama & Yoshisaka, 1959 - Taiwan
- E. m. nigrescens (Leech, 1894) - western China
