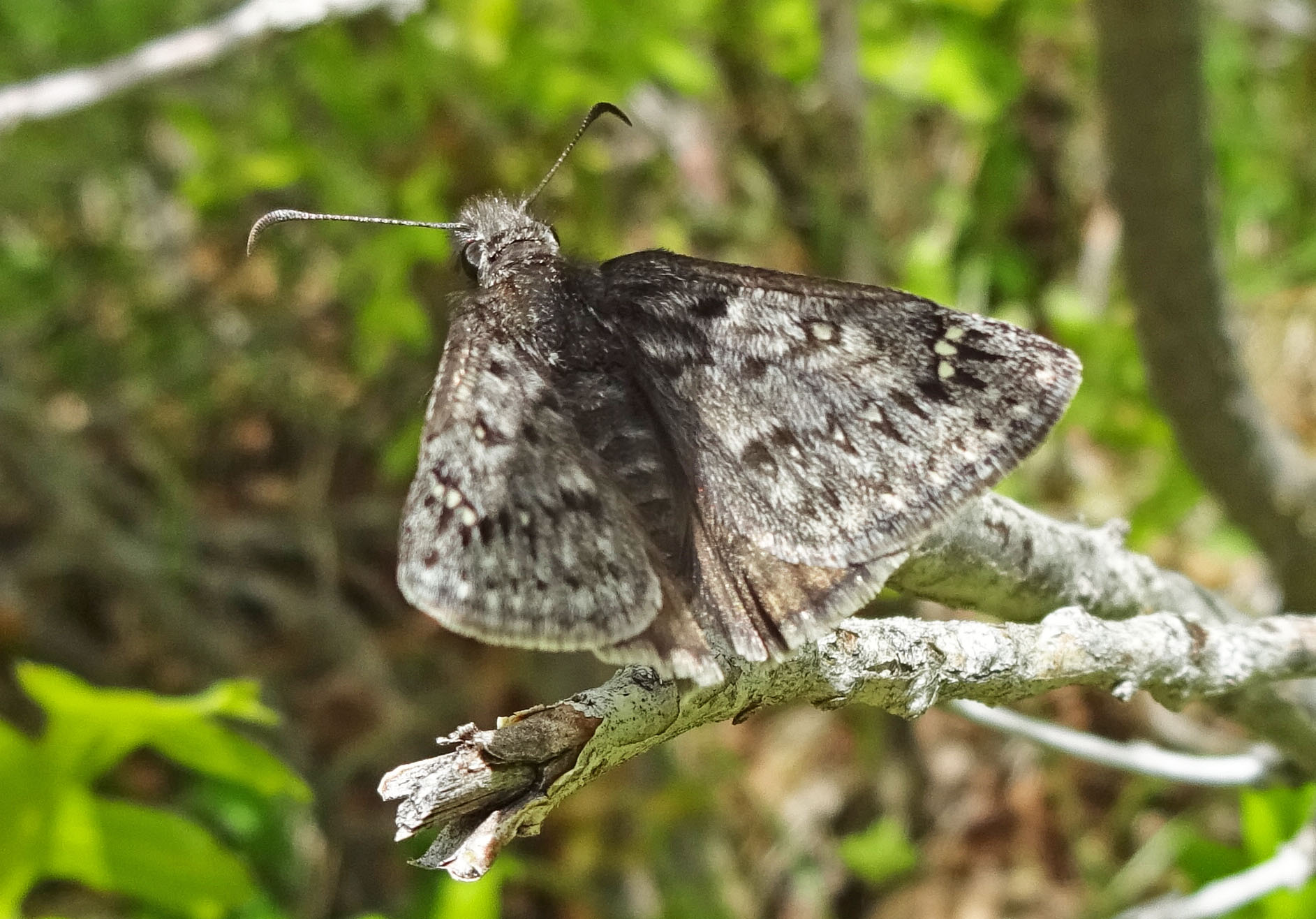

Scientific classification
- Domain: Eukaryota
- Kingdom: Animalia
- Phylum: Arthropoda
- Class: Insecta
- Order: Lepidoptera
- Family: Hesperiidae
- Genus: Erynnis
- Species: E. telemachus

Binomial name
- Erynnis telemachus Burns, 1960

= Erynnis telemachus =

Species of butterfly

Erynnis telemachus, the Rocky Mountain duskywing, is a species of spread-wing skipper in the butterfly family Hesperiidae. It is found in North America.
