= Boneset =

Boneset may refer to:

== Plants ==
- Various species of Ageratina
- Various species of Eupatorium
  - Particularly Eupatorium perfoliatum
- Symphytum officinale, a garden herb also called comfrey

== Album ==
- Boneset, an album by Diane Cluck
