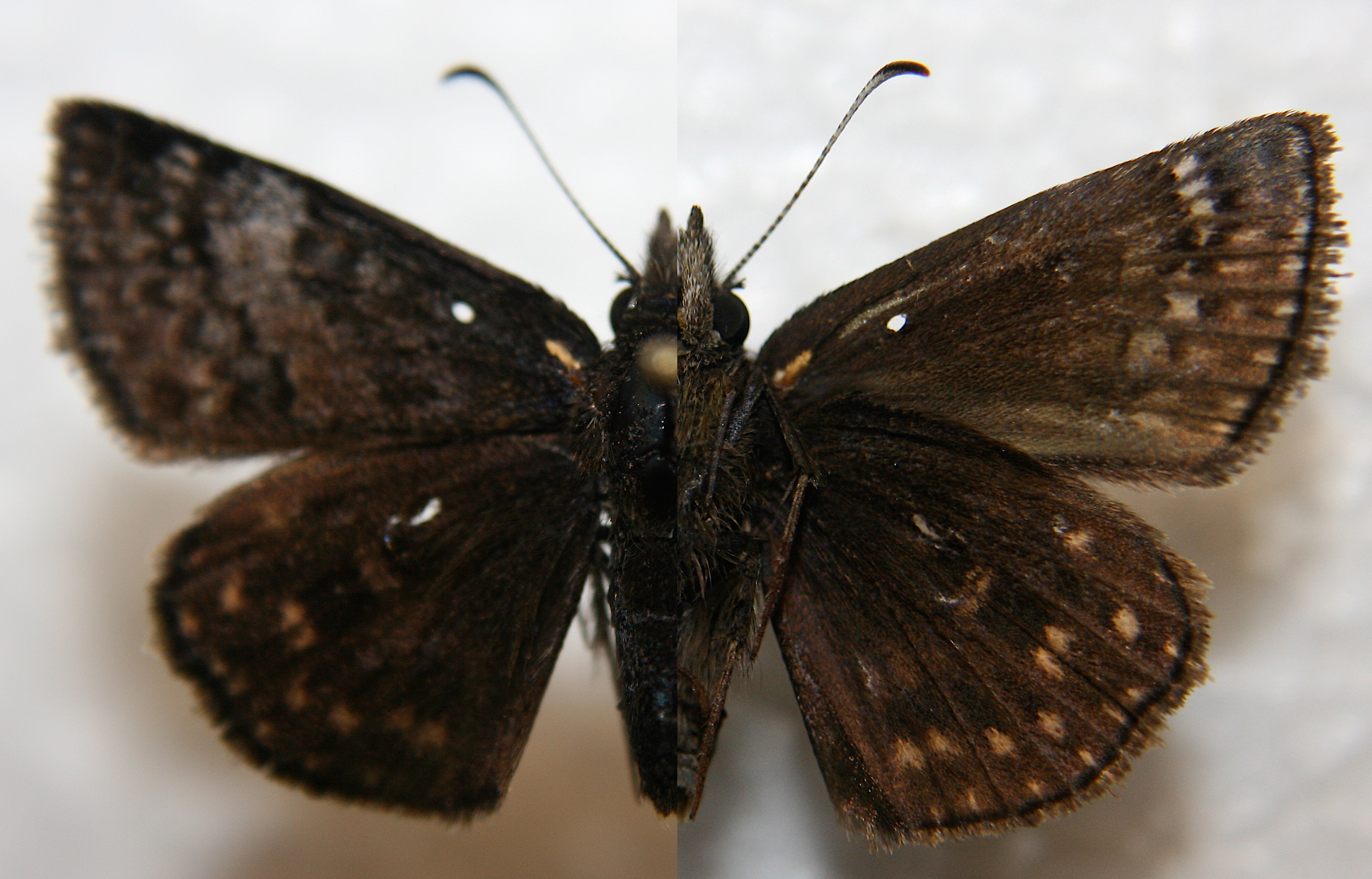

Conservation status
- Secure (NatureServe)

Scientific classification
- Kingdom: Animalia
- Phylum: Arthropoda
- Class: Insecta
- Order: Lepidoptera
- Family: Hesperiidae
- Genus: Erynnis
- Species: E. brizo

Binomial name
- Erynnis brizo (Boisduval & Le Conte [1832])

= Erynnis brizo =

Species of butterfly

Erynnis brizo, the sleepy duskywing or banded oak duskywing, is a species of Hesperiidae butterfly that occurs throughout North America and is commonly confused with E. juvenalis and E. lucilius. The species is listed as threatened in Connecticut and Maine.

== Description ==
The upper forewing is blackish brown with continuous bluish-brown spots. The hindwing is almost completely brown with lighter brown spots. The caterpillar of this species is small and gray green with purplish tips. There is a faint lateral white stripe. Unlike most caterpillars Hesperiidae have distinct heads and the E. brizo's head is brown with an orange spot.

== Habitat ==
This small Erynnis stays in oak-pine barrens and cut-over forest. It can be seen near forest edges including near roads, train tracks and towns.

== Food plants ==
The larvae consume scrub oak (Quercus ilicifolia) and other shrubby oaks. The adults consume nectar from flowers of heaths (Ericaceae) including wild azalea and blueberry; also blackberry and dandelion.

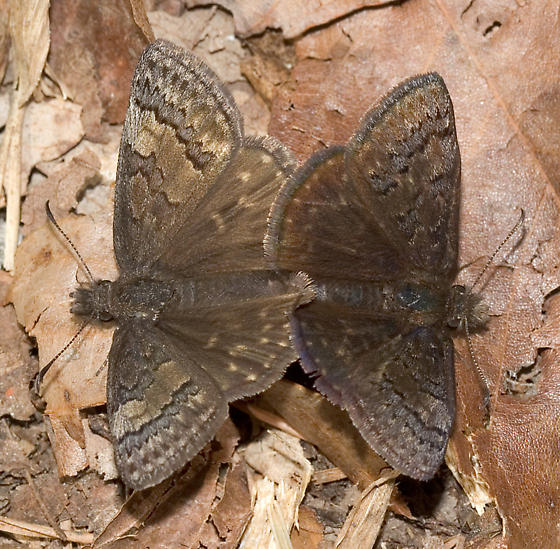
Mating
