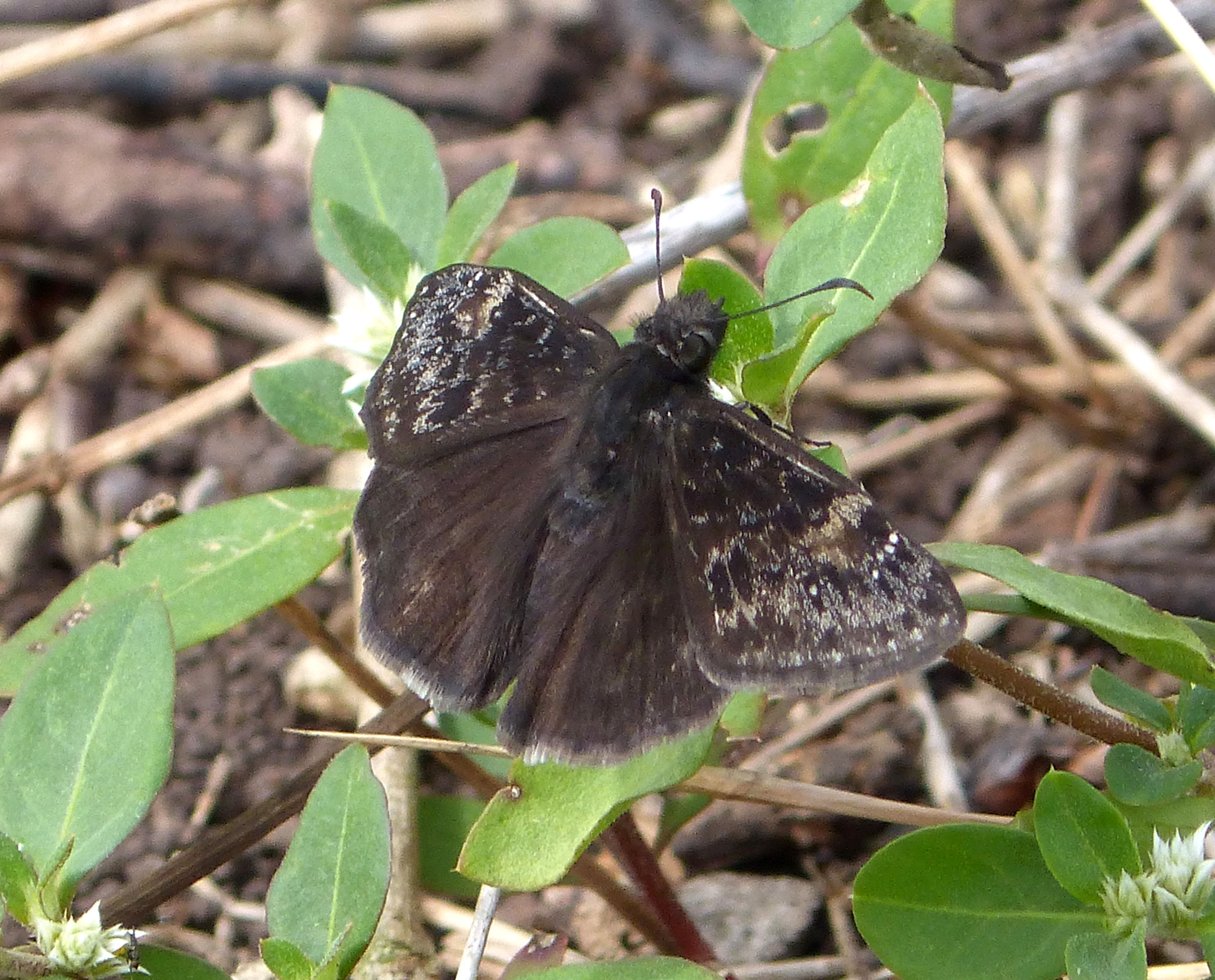

Conservation status
- Secure (NatureServe)

Scientific classification
- Domain: Eukaryota
- Kingdom: Animalia
- Phylum: Arthropoda
- Class: Insecta
- Order: Lepidoptera
- Family: Hesperiidae
- Genus: Erynnis
- Species: E. zarucco

Binomial name
- Erynnis zarucco (H. Lucas, 1857)

Synonyms
- Thanaos zarucco H. Lucas, 1857; Nisoniades terentius Scudder & Burgess, 1870; Nisoniades ovidius Scudder & Burgess, 1870; Nisoniades naevius Lintner, 1881; Antigonus diogenes Plötz, 1884

= Erynnis zarucco =

Zarucco duskywing

Species of butterfly

Erynnis zarucco, commonly known as the zarucco duskywing, is a species of butterfly in the family Hesperiidae. It is found (rarely) from southern Ontario to the southeastern United States.

The wingspan is 32–38 mm. There are three generations in the deep south but only two in the north.

The larvae feed on tree and herbaceous Fabaceae.
