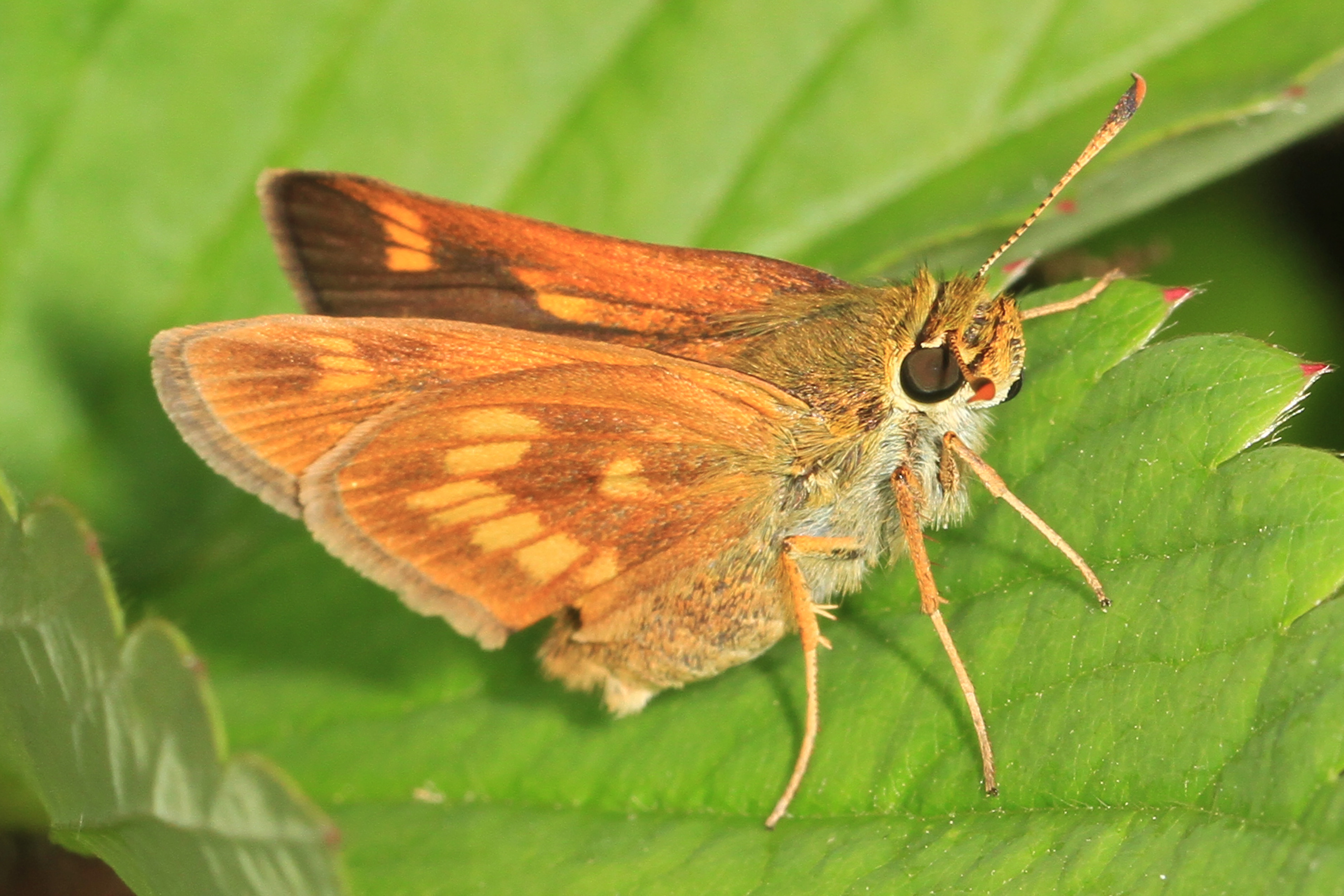

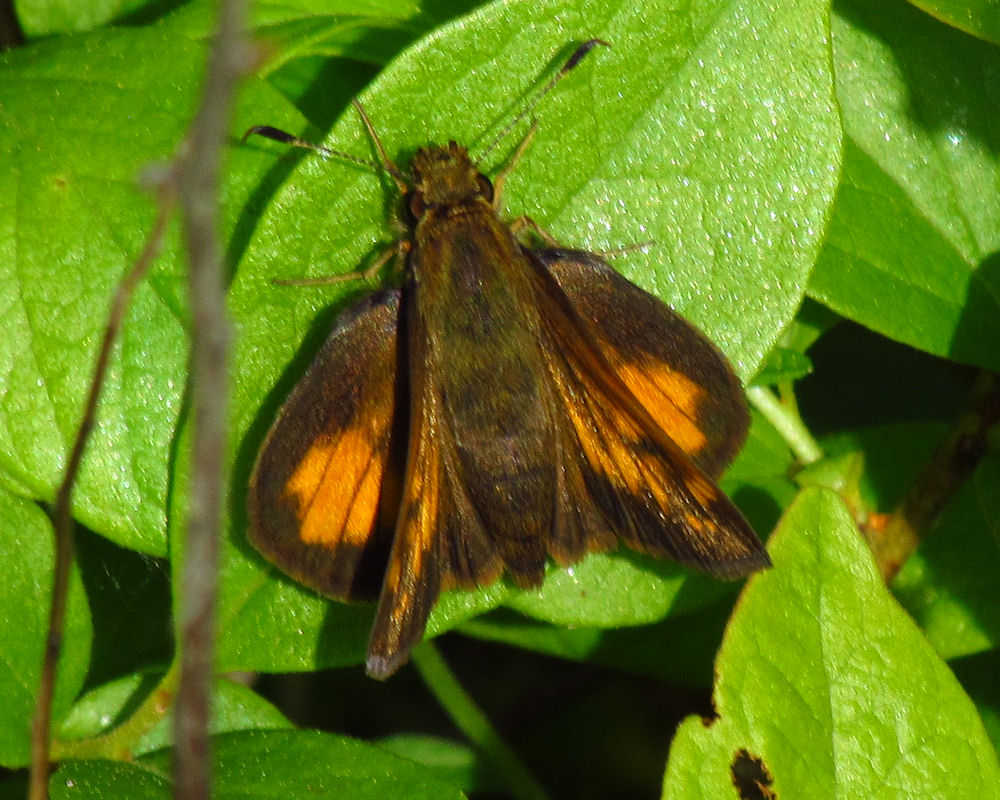

Conservation status
- Secure (NatureServe)

Scientific classification
- Kingdom: Animalia
- Phylum: Arthropoda
- Class: Insecta
- Order: Lepidoptera
- Family: Hesperiidae
- Genus: Limochores
- Species: L. mystic

Binomial name
- Limochores mystic (W. H. Edwards, 1863)

Synonyms
- Polites mystic

= Limochores mystic =

Species of butterfly

Limochores mystic, the long dash or long dash skipper, is a species of butterfly. The species is commonly found in north of North America and in mountains in the south of North America, in grassy habitats. The grassy areas include meadows, marshes, streamsides, wood edges, and prairie swales. On the top, the species has dark brown reddish to yellowish-orange markings. The forewing of the female has a broad black patch at the base. The forewing of the male has a long, slightly curved stigma which may be connected to the dash near the apex. Underneath the hindwing, the species is orange brown with a curved band of equal-sized yellow spots.
