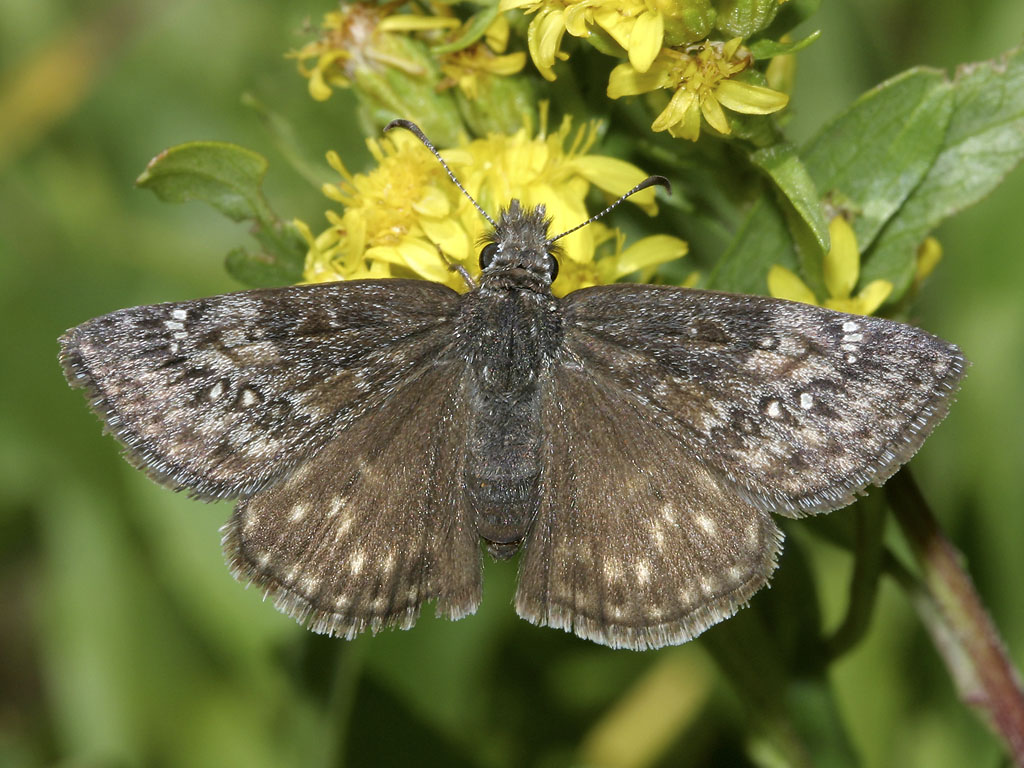

Scientific classification
- Kingdom: Animalia
- Phylum: Arthropoda
- Clade: Pancrustacea
- Class: Insecta
- Order: Lepidoptera
- Family: Hesperiidae
- Genus: Erynnis
- Species: E. persius

Binomial name
- Erynnis persius Scudder(1863)

= Erynnis persius =

Persius duskywing

Species of butterfly

Erynnis persius, commonly known as Persius duskywing, is a species of butterfly in the family Hesperiidae that occurs in North America. The eastern subspecies Erynnis persius persius is rarer and protected by law in some regions.

== Description ==
The upperside of both the forewings and hindwings are a dark brown color. The forewing has clear spots with other dim markings and the patch at the end of the cell is gray. Males have raised white hairs on their forewings. The hindwings are fringed with darker brown to black and have another fringe that is creamy white. Females have a scent scale patch on their 7th abdominal segment. The species may be difficult to distinguish from other duskywing skippers.

Caterpillars of this species are light green with a reddish cast and covered with fine, short hairs. Their head is all brownish black.

== Range ==
The Persius Duskywing has a wide range across North America from Alaska to southeastern Manitoba, covering much of the western United States down to Arizona and New Mexico. The eastern population ranges from New England west to Wisconsin, and south to Virginia.

== Life Cycle ==
The Persius Duskywing has a single annual generation. The mature larva hibernates and pupates between April - June. Males seek females by perching on the ground or on low vegetation, and females lay eggs on the host plant vegetation. Caterpillar hosts include Lupine (Lupinus), golden banner (Thermopsis), Lotus, and other legumes. Adults feed on flower nectar. The larval form of subspecies E. persius persius is dependent on the wild blue lupine, Lupinus perennis, as a host plant.

== Conservation ==
The species is ranked as globally secure, however the eastern subspecies is rare and in severe decline. Reasons include habitat destruction and alteration, decline of its food plant the wild blue lupine (Lupinus perennis), and pesticide spraying for Spongy Moth (Lymantria dispar). It is thought to be extirpated in Ontario.

It is protected by law as a threatened species in Michigan and an endangered species in Minnesota, Ohio, New York, and New Hampshire. The subspecies Erynnis persius persius is listed as endangered in Connecticut, and endangered in Canada under the Species at Risk act.
