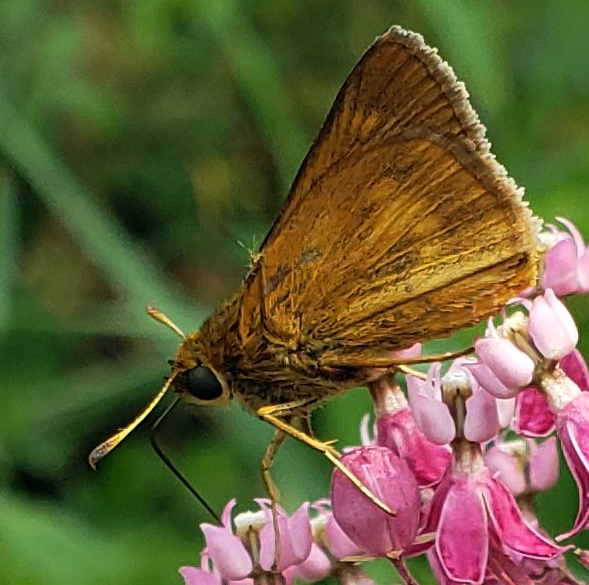

Conservation status
- Apparently Secure (NatureServe)

Scientific classification
- Kingdom: Animalia
- Phylum: Arthropoda
- Clade: Pancrustacea
- Class: Insecta
- Order: Lepidoptera
- Family: Hesperiidae
- Genus: Euphyes
- Species: E. conspicua

Binomial name
- Euphyes conspicua (W. H. Edwards, 1863)

Synonyms
- Hesperia conspicua W. H. Edwards, 1863; Euphyes conspicuus; Atrytone conspicua; Hesperia pontiac W. H. Edwards, 1863; Limochroes pontiac; Hedone orono Scudder, 1872; Atrytone buchholzi Ehrlich and Gillham, 1951

= Euphyes conspicua =

Species of butterfly

Euphyes conspicua, the black dash, is a butterfly of the family Hesperiidae. The species was first described by William Henry Edwards in 1863. It is found in the upper Midwest of North America, from eastern Nebraska east to southern Ontario and along the central Atlantic Coast from Massachusetts south to south-eastern Virginia. Its habitat includes shrubby or partially wooded wetland.

The wingspan is 32–42 mm. Adults are on wing from June to August in one generation per year. They feed on the nectar of various flowers.

The larvae feed on Carex stricta and possibly other Carex species. Adults feed on nectar from flowers including buttonbush, jewelweed, and swamp thistle.

== Subspecies ==
E. conspicua has three subspecies:

- E. c. buchholzi (P. Ehrlich and Gillham, 1951)
- E. c. conspicua (W. H. Edwards, 1863)
- E. c. orono (Scudder, 1872)
