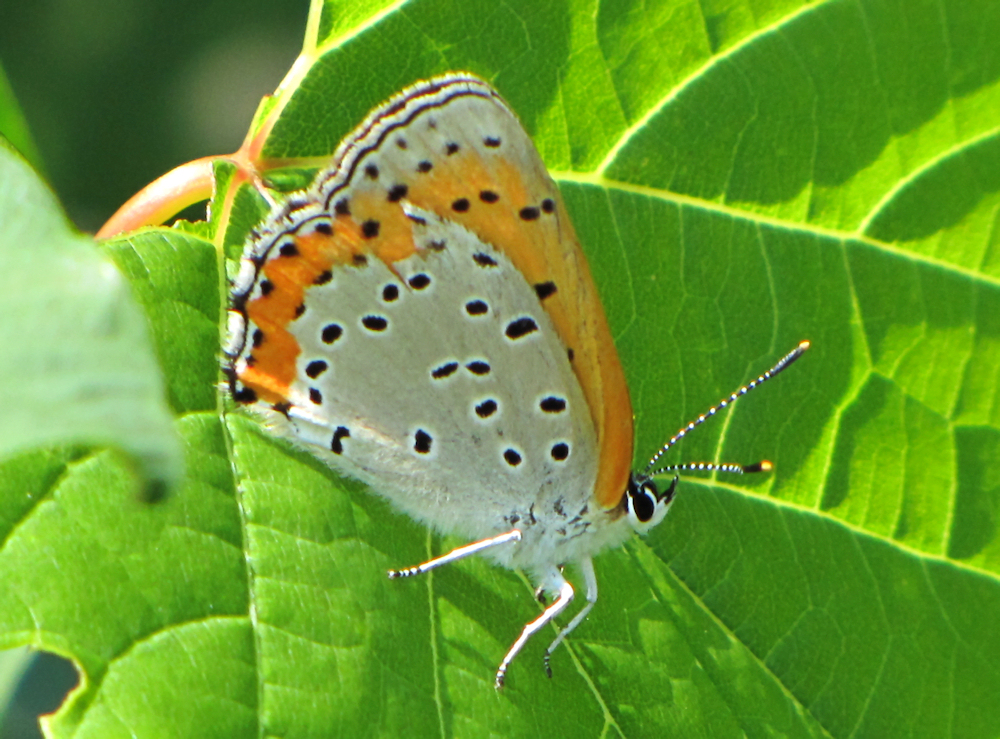
- Petrie Island, Ottawa

Conservation status
- Secure (NatureServe)

Scientific classification
- Kingdom: Animalia
- Phylum: Arthropoda
- Class: Insecta
- Order: Lepidoptera
- Family: Lycaenidae
- Genus: Lycaena
- Species: L. hyllus

Binomial name
- Lycaena hyllus (Cramer, [1775])

Synonyms
- Papilio hyllus; Hylloycaena hyllus; Lycaena thoe; Chrysophanus thoe

= Lycaena hyllus =

Species of butterfly

Lycaena hyllus, the bronze copper, is a butterfly of the lycaenids family found in North America.

== Description ==
The upperside has a brown background with golden zig-zag borders along the margins of the hindwings. Females have lighter areas in the forewings with several dark spots within the lighter areas. The undersides are primarily white with dark spots and underlying orange areas. The wingspan is 23 to 38 mm.

== Range ==
It is widespread from Alberta to northern Nevada in the west through to the east coasts of Canada and the United States. This butterfly's range is similar to that of the Lycaena heteronea, especially in Alberta. It is listed as a species of special concern in the US state of Connecticut.

== Host plants ==
Their hosts are plants of the family Polygonaceae, including water dock, curled dock, and varieties of Persicaria amphibia.

== Adult plants ==
Adults have been observed feeding from blackberry and red clover.
