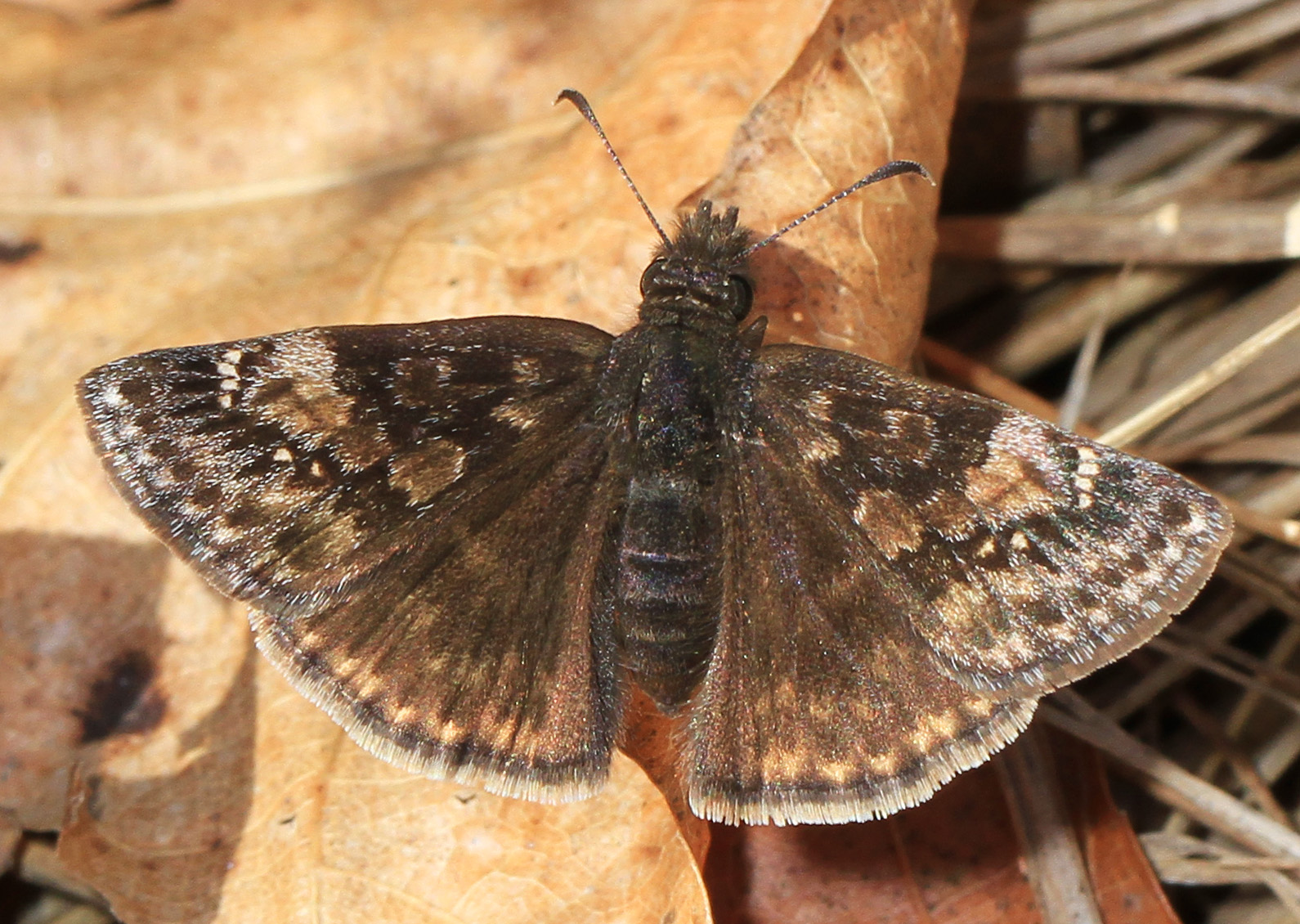

Conservation status
- Secure (NatureServe)

Scientific classification
- Kingdom: Animalia
- Phylum: Arthropoda
- Clade: Pancrustacea
- Class: Insecta
- Order: Lepidoptera
- Family: Hesperiidae
- Genus: Erynnis
- Species: E. baptisiae

Binomial name
- Erynnis baptisiae (Forbes, 1936)

= Erynnis baptisiae =

Species of butterfly

Erynnis baptisiae, the wild indigo duskywing, is a species of butterfly of the family Hesperiidae. It is found in North America from southern Ontario and New England, west to central Nebraska, and south to Georgia, the Gulf Coast, and south-central Texas.

Host plants include wild indigo, wild blue indigo, lupine, false lupine, and crown vetch.
