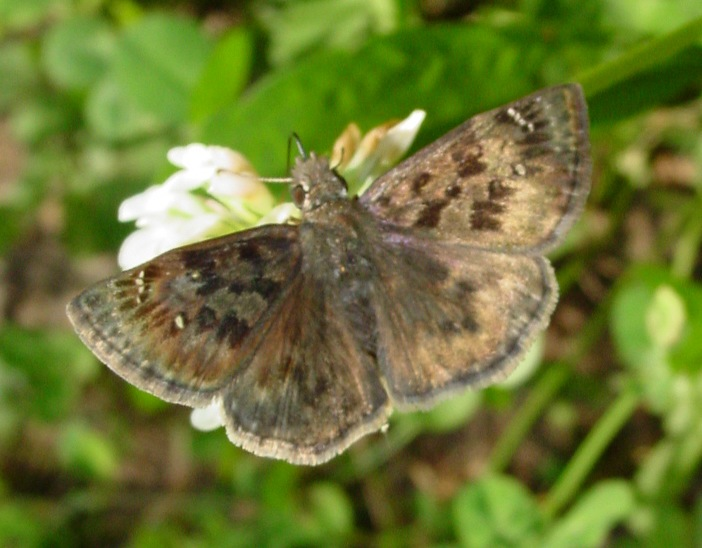

Conservation status
- Vulnerable (NatureServe)

Scientific classification
- Domain: Eukaryota
- Kingdom: Animalia
- Phylum: Arthropoda
- Class: Insecta
- Order: Lepidoptera
- Family: Hesperiidae
- Genus: Erynnis
- Species: E. martialis

Binomial name
- Erynnis martialis (Scudder, 1869)

Synonyms
- Nisoniades martialis Scudder, 1869; Thanaos quercus Butler, 1870; Nisoniades ausonius Lintner, 1872

= Erynnis martialis =

Mottled duskywing

Endangered species of butterfly

Erynnis martialis, commonly known as the mottled duskywing, is a species of butterfly in the family Hesperiidae. It is found in most of the eastern United States and in southern Ontario, and southeastern Manitoba. It is listed as a species of special concern and believed extirpated in the US state of Connecticut.

The wingspan is 25–29 mm. There can be two generations from mid-May to late August.

The larvae feed on wild lilacs including New Jersey tea (Ceanothus americanus) and redroot (Ceanothus herbaceus) in the buckthorn family (Rhamnaceae). Adults feed on nectar from flowers of Bush houstonia, Gromwell, Verbena stricta and other plants.

Main threats posed to mottled duskywing populations are habitat loss, fragmentation and invasive species control measures. Urbanization, suburban sprawl, agriculture and logging have destroyed many oak savanna habitats that the mottled duskywing rely on. The spraying of DDT and carbaryl to control the population of the invasive gypsy moth also pose a major threat to the success of the species.
