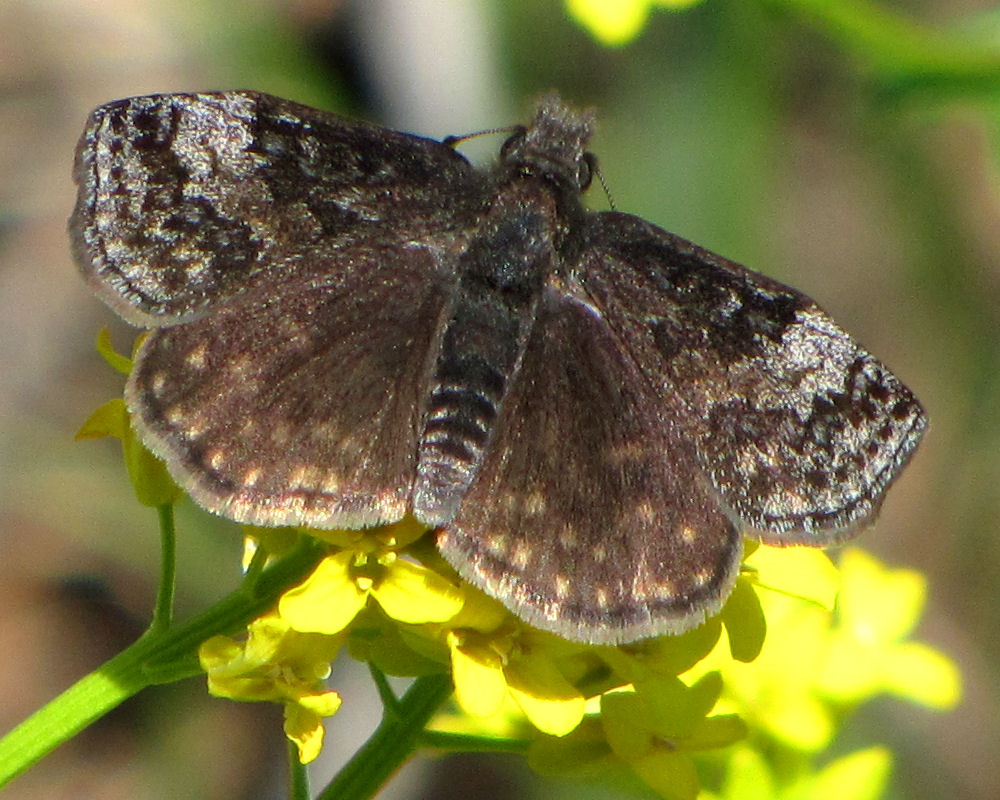

Conservation status
- Secure (NatureServe)

Scientific classification
- Domain: Eukaryota
- Kingdom: Animalia
- Phylum: Arthropoda
- Class: Insecta
- Order: Lepidoptera
- Family: Hesperiidae
- Genus: Erynnis
- Species: E. icelus

Binomial name
- Erynnis icelus (Scudder & Burgess, 1870)

Synonyms
- List: Nisoniades icelus Scudder & Burgess, 1870; Nisoniades icelus Lintner, 1872; Nisoniades bautista Plötz, 1884; Nisoniades hamamaelidis Scudder, 1889; Thanaos icelus (Scudder & Burgess, 1870)

= Erynnis icelus =

Dreamy duskywing

Species of butterfly

Erynnis icelus, also known as the dreamy duskywing or aspen dusky wing, is a species of butterfly in the family Hesperiidae. It is found in boreal North America.

The wingspan is 29–38 mm. There is one generation with adults on wing from April to early July. There might be a rare second generation in the southern Appalachian Mountains.

The larvae are pale green with multiple white dots. Its heart is visible as a green, middorsal stripe.

The larvae feed on Salix, Populus and sometimes Betula species. Adults feed on nectar from flowers of blueberry, wild strawberry, blackberry, Labrador tea, dogbane, New Jersey tea, winter cress, purple vetch and lupine.
