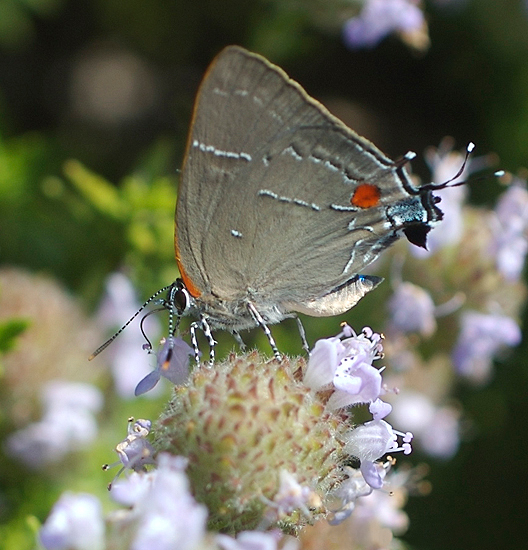

Conservation status
- Secure (NatureServe)

Scientific classification
- Kingdom: Animalia
- Phylum: Arthropoda
- Class: Insecta
- Order: Lepidoptera
- Family: Lycaenidae
- Genus: Parrhasius
- Species: P. m-album

Binomial name
- Parrhasius m-album Boisduval & Leconte, 1833

= Parrhasius m-album =

Species of butterfly

Parrhasius m-album, or the white M hairstreak, is a species of butterfly of the family Lycaenidae. It is found in the United States from western Connecticut to southeast Iowa, southern Missouri to east Texas, the Gulf Coast, and peninsular Florida. On rare occasions some stray to Michigan and Wisconsin.

The wings are often iridescent near the bottom. The females are larger than the males in this species. The wingspan of Parrhasius m-album is 32–41 mm.

The larvae feed on Quercus virginiana and other Quercus species. the larvae appear a light green color.
