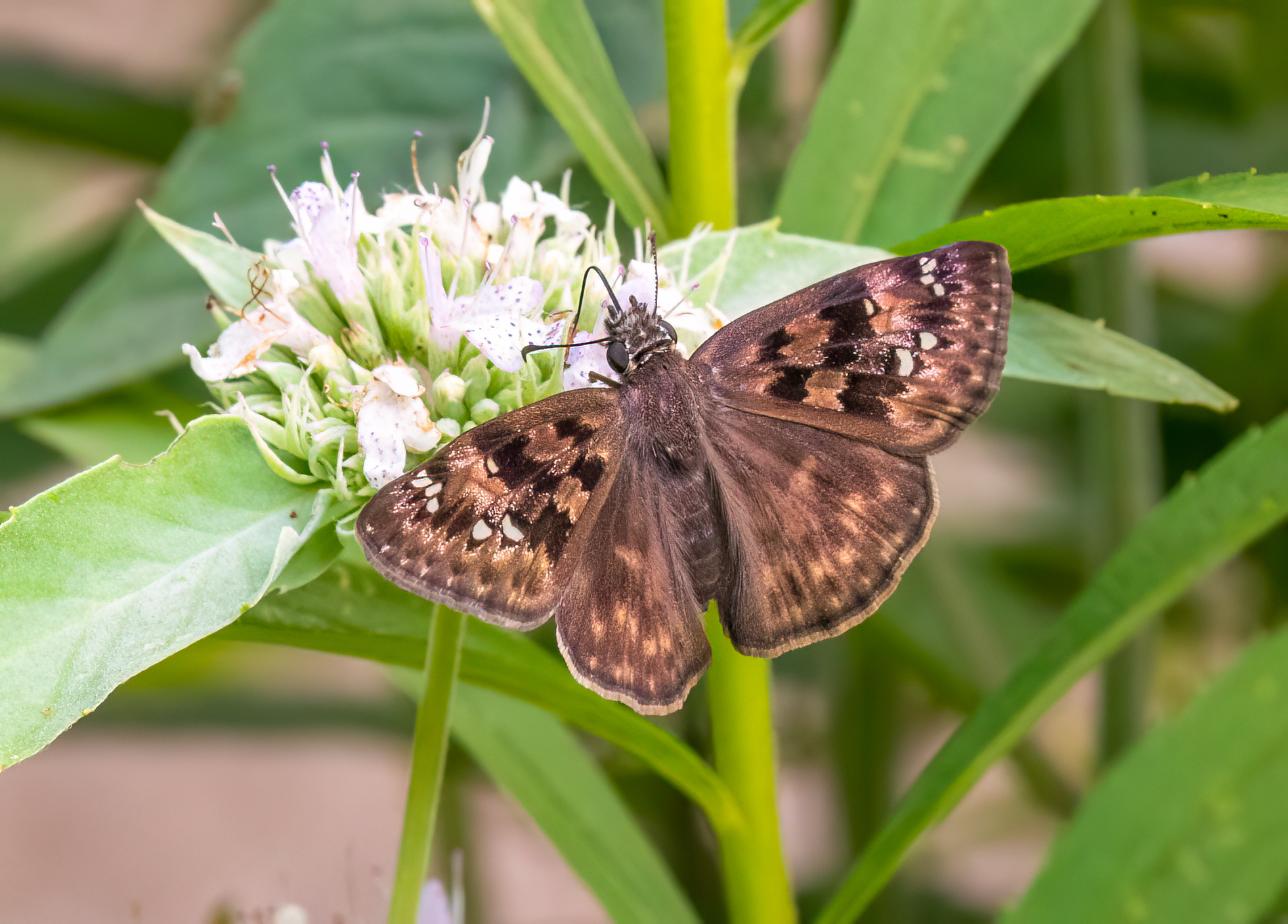
- Female
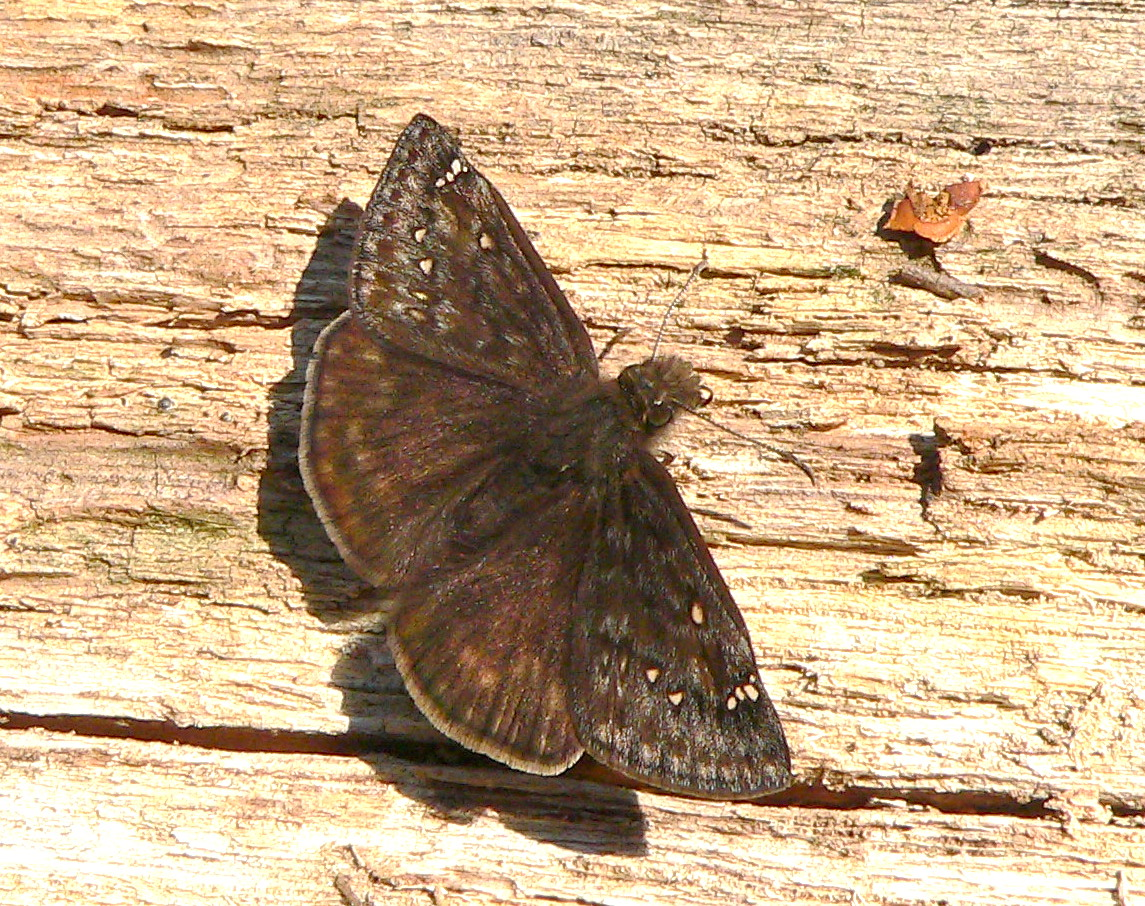
- Male

Conservation status
- Secure (NatureServe)

Scientific classification
- Domain: Eukaryota
- Kingdom: Animalia
- Phylum: Arthropoda
- Class: Insecta
- Order: Lepidoptera
- Family: Hesperiidae
- Genus: Erynnis
- Species: E. horatius

Binomial name
- Erynnis horatius (Scudder & Burgess, 1870)

Synonyms
- List: Nisoniades horatius Scudder & Burgess, 1870; Nisoniades virgilius Scudder & Burgess, 1870; Nisoniades petronius Mead, 1875 (nom. nud.); Nisoniades petronius Lintner, 1881; Thanaos petronius (Lintner, 1881); Thanaos horatius (Scudder & Burgess, 1870)

= Erynnis horatius =

Horace's duskywing

Species of butterfly

Erynnis horatius, commonly known as Horace's duskywing, is a species of butterfly in the family Hesperiidae. It is found in the United States from Massachusetts to Florida, and west to eastern South Dakota, the Gulf Coast, south-eastern Utah, Colorado, north-eastern Arizona, and New Mexico. It is listed as a species of special concern in the US state of Connecticut.

Fringes are brown. Upperside of male forewing is dark brown with little contrast and no white overscaling. Upperside of female forewing is light brown with a contrasting pattern and large transparent spots. Underside of hindwing is usually without two spots below the apex. The male has a costal fold containing yellow scent scales; the female has a patch of scent scales on the 7th abdominal segment. The wingspan is 36–49 mm.

There are two generations in the north, with adults on the wing from April to September; there are three generations in the deep south and Texas, with adults on the wing from January to November. Adults prefer open woodlands and edges, clearings, fence rows, wooded swamps, power-line right-of-ways, open fields and roadsides.

Caterpillars are hosted by various oak species such as willow oak (Quercus phellos), northern red oak (Q. velutina), scrub oak (Q. ilicifolia), water oak (Q. nigra), post oak (Q. stellata), and live oak (Q. virginiana). Adults consume nectar from flowers up to about 4.5 feet (1.4 m) above ground level, including those of dogbane, buttonbush, sneezeweed, goldenrod, peppermint, boneset, and winter cress.
