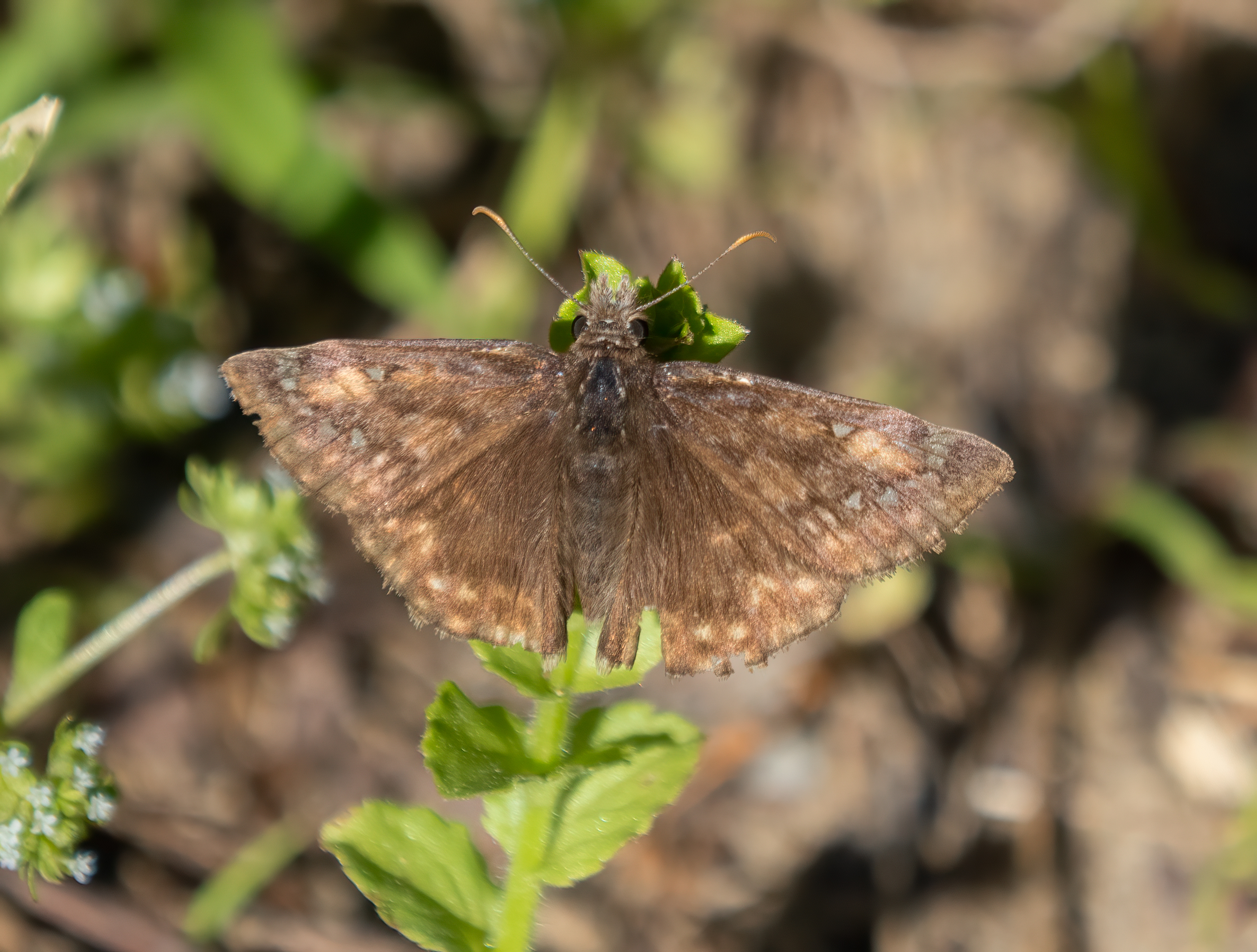
- Prime Hook National Wildlife Refuge, Delaware

Conservation status
- Secure (NatureServe)

Scientific classification
- Kingdom: Animalia
- Phylum: Arthropoda
- Clade: Pancrustacea
- Class: Insecta
- Order: Lepidoptera
- Family: Hesperiidae
- Genus: Gesta
- Species: G. juvenalis

Binomial name
- Gesta juvenalis (Fabricius, 1793)

Synonyms
- Erynnis juvenalis

= Gesta juvenalis =

Juvenal's duskywing

Species of butterfly

Gesta juvenalis, commonly known as Juvenal's duskywing, is a species of butterfly in the family Hesperiidae.

== Appearance and distribution ==
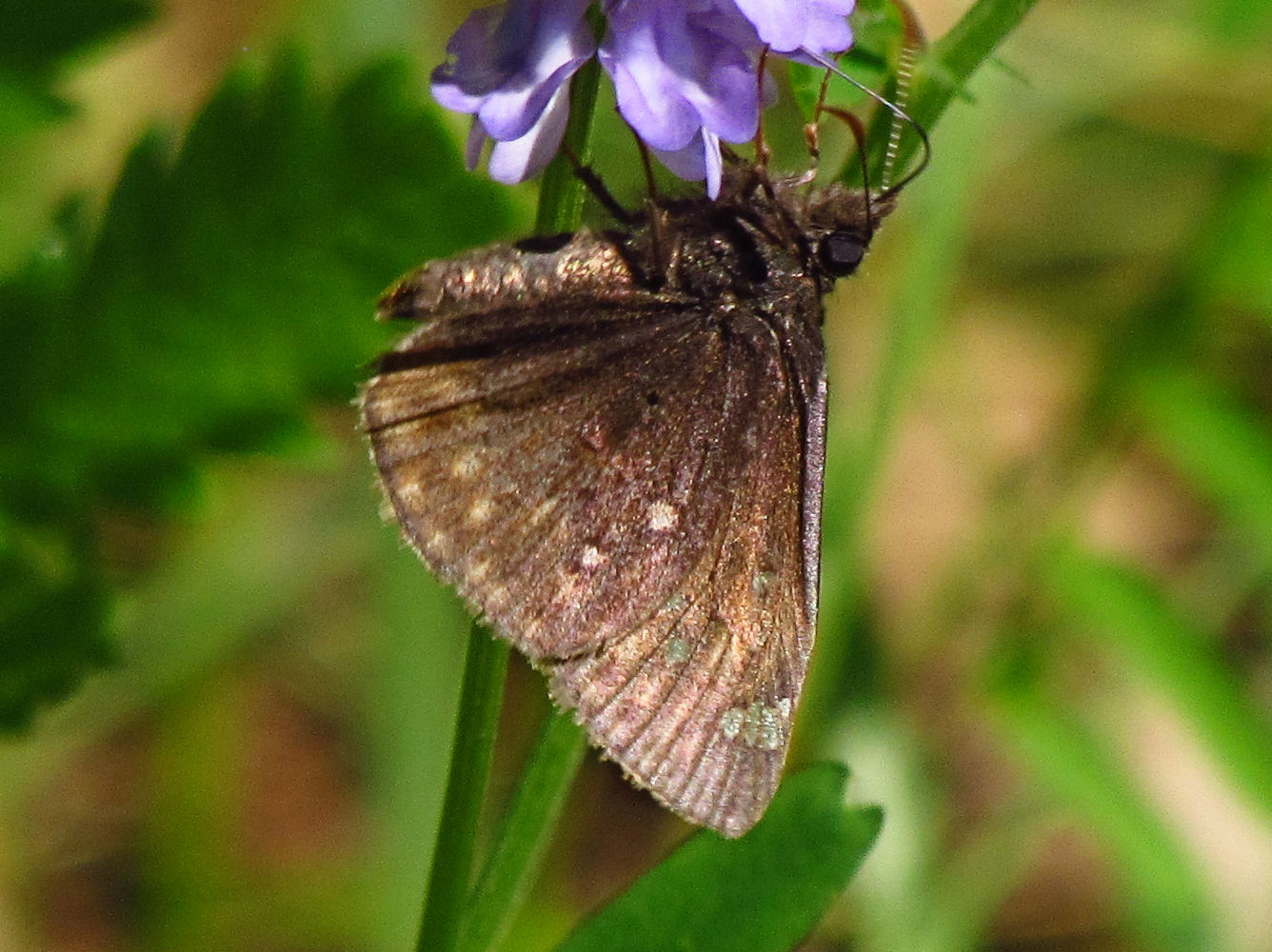
Underside view

It is common in eastern North American oak woods from southern Manitoba to southern Quebec and Nova Scotia southward to Texas and Florida. This dark-brown skipper is larger than most eastern duskywings (wingspan: 30 to 37 mm). It has one brood in the spring (May to late June) in the east but two broods in spring and summer in the southwest. Both sexes have two to four white spots on the forewing. The females have grayer forewings and are more boldly marked. Both sexes have two spots near the upper margins of the ventral side of hindwings that are diagnostic of the species. Larval food plant: oaks

== Similar species ==
- Horace's duskywing (E. horatius)
- Zarucco duskywing (E. zarucco)
