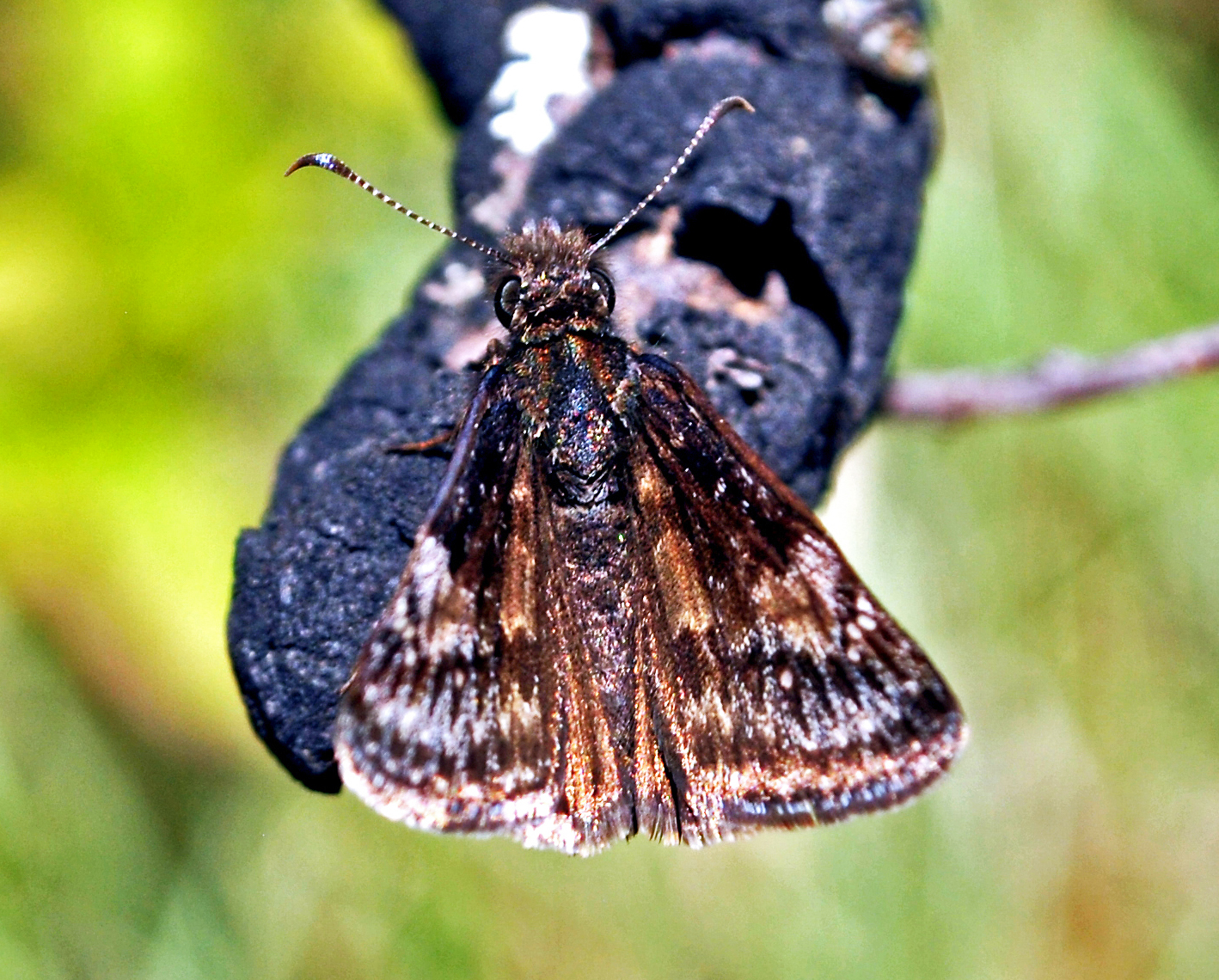

Scientific classification
- Domain: Eukaryota
- Kingdom: Animalia
- Phylum: Arthropoda
- Class: Insecta
- Order: Lepidoptera
- Family: Hesperiidae
- Genus: Erynnis
- Species: E. lucilius

Binomial name
- Erynnis lucilius (Scudder & Burgess, 1870)

Synonyms
- Thanaos lucilius Lintner, 1872

= Erynnis lucilius =

Columbine duskywing

Species of butterfly

Erynnis lucilius, the columbine duskywing, is a species of butterfly in the family Hesperiidae. It is found in North America from southern Quebec to Manitoba and south to the north-eastern United States. It is part of the skipper family because its wings create a skipping pattern.

The wingspan is 21–29 mm (0.83–1.14 in). There are two generations in the east from early May to mid-June.

== Nutrition ==
The larvae and mature caterpillars feed on leaves while adult butterflies consume flower nectar.

== Lifecycle ==
Larva eggs are attached to the underside of plant leaves. Once hatched, the larva consume the surrounding plant leaves and rest from time to time in the shade of plants. Larva continue to eat until they fully mature as caterpillars. At full maturity, caterpillars enter their hibernation to begin their transformation into adult butterflies. Adult Duskywings pollinate plants as they consume nectar and seek out another butterfly to mate with. After mating, female Duskywings lay their newly born eggs on the underside of a plant leaf ready to hatch.

== Appearance ==
The Duskywing will appear in shades of brown. The underside of the hindwing has marginal spots. Males of the species have a costal fold containing yellow-colored "scent scales" to provide a sense of smell. Females of the species have their "scent scales" on the 7th abdominal segment.

== Habitat ==
Duskywings can be found in ecosystems containing ravines and gullies. Mostly living in rocky and deciduous woodland forests, the Duskywing will prefer natural shady areas to rest with plenty of leafy plants for consumption.
