= Joseph Albert Lintner =

American entomologist

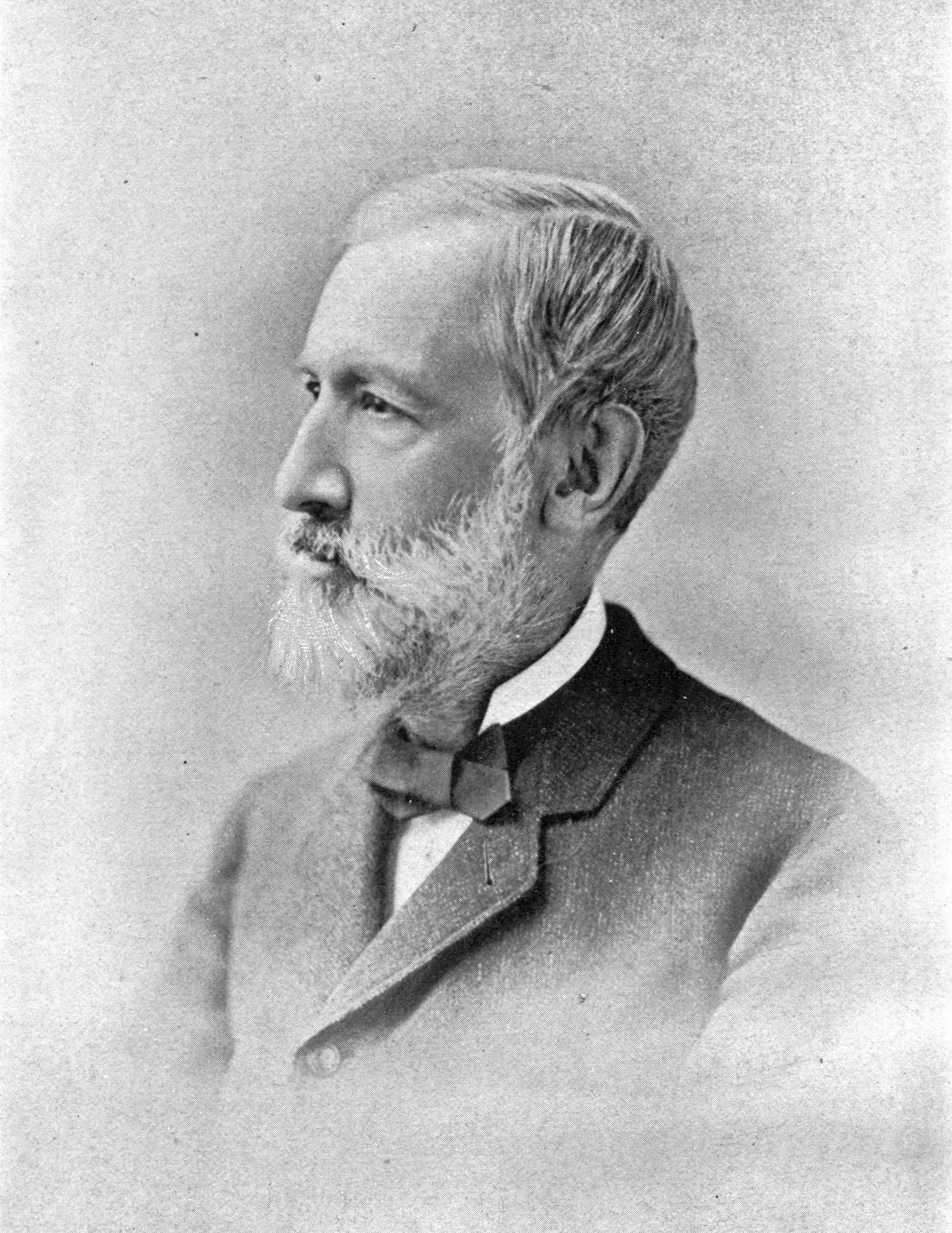
Joseph A. Lintner

Joseph Albert Lintner (8 February 1822 in Schoharie, New York – 5 May 1898 in Rome) was an American entomologist who held the position of state entomologist from 1881, following the creation of this post by the federal government, until 1898. Lintner wrote 900 scientific papers and 13 entries of the Report on the injurious and other insects of the State of New York on crop pests and injurious insects associated with agriculture. Lintner's collection is in the New York State Museum.
