= List of Pachyschelus species =

This is a list of 274 species in the genus Pachyschelus.

== Pachyschelus species ==
- Pachyschelus abnitidus Kerremans, 1903
- Pachyschelus acutus Kerremans, 1896
- Pachyschelus aeneicollis (Kirsch, 1873)
- Pachyschelus aeneus Kerremans, 1896
- Pachyschelus affinis Waterhouse, 1889
- Pachyschelus afflictus Obenberger, 1932
- Pachyschelus alatus Kerremans, 1899
- Pachyschelus albofasciatus Fisher, 1922
- Pachyschelus albopictus Kerremans, 1894
- Pachyschelus alutacellus Obenberger, 1940
- Pachyschelus alvarengai Cobos, 1967
- Pachyschelus amatus Obenberger, 1925
- Pachyschelus amazonarum Obenberger, 1925
- Pachyschelus anniae Obenberger, 1925
- Pachyschelus anthracinus Obenberger, 1925
- Pachyschelus ardens Waterhouse, 1889
- Pachyschelus argenteocinctus Obenberger, 1925
- Pachyschelus arlequin Cobos, 1978
- Pachyschelus atratus Kerremans, 1896
- Pachyschelus auricollis Kerremans, 1896
- Pachyschelus aurithorax Obenberger, 1932
- Pachyschelus austerus (Kirsch, 1873)
- Pachyschelus aversus Waterhouse, 1889
- Pachyschelus basalis Kerremans, 1896
- Pachyschelus bedeli Obenberger, 1921
- Pachyschelus beniensis Fisher, 1925
- Pachyschelus bifasciatus Waterhouse, 1889
- Pachyschelus bifoveolatus Cobos, 1967
- Pachyschelus biguttatus Waterhouse, 1889
- Pachyschelus binderi Obenberger, 1925
- Pachyschelus bolivianus Obenberger, 1925
- Pachyschelus bonadonai Cobos, 1956
- Pachyschelus bordoni Cobos, 1967
- Pachyschelus bourgoini Obenberger, 1925
- Pachyschelus brancuccii Bílý, 1983
- Pachyschelus brevis (Kirsch, 1873)
- Pachyschelus bucki Cobos, 1956
- Pachyschelus buenavistae Obenberger, 1932
- Pachyschelus calamuchitae Obenberger, 1947
- Pachyschelus capitatus Kerremans, 1903
- Pachyschelus catharinensis Obenberger, 1940
- Pachyschelus cavinas Fisher, 1925
- Pachyschelus chrysocephalus Kerremans, 1896
- Pachyschelus circularis Kerremans, 1899
- Pachyschelus circumdatus Kerremans, 1897
- Pachyschelus circumnigrus Cobos, 1972
- Pachyschelus clarus Kerremans, 1897
- Pachyschelus cobosi Bellamy, 1996
- Pachyschelus coelestis Kerremans, 1896
- Pachyschelus coeruleipennis Kerremans, 1897
- Pachyschelus coeruleus (Gory, 1841)
- Pachyschelus collaris (Gory & Laporte, 1840)
- Pachyschelus columbi Obenberger, 1925
- Pachyschelus communis Waterhouse, 1889
- Pachyschelus confinis Kerremans, 1899
- Pachyschelus confusus Wellso & Manley in Wellso, et al., 1976
- Pachyschelus congener Kerremans, 1899
- Pachyschelus connectens Obenberger, 1932
- Pachyschelus consobrinus Thomson, 1879
- Pachyschelus coomani Théry, 1936
- Pachyschelus corax Obenberger, 1925
- Pachyschelus cordiformis Kerremans, 1896
- Pachyschelus corruscus (Gory, 1841)
- Pachyschelus crotonis Obenberger, 1960
- Pachyschelus cupreotinctus Cobos, 1956
- Pachyschelus cupricauda Fisher, 1922
- Pachyschelus cyanellus (Gory & Laporte, 1840)
- Pachyschelus cyaneonitens Cobos, 1956
- Pachyschelus cyanimargo Obenberger, 1925
- Pachyschelus davidi Obenberger, 1932
- Pachyschelus debilis Kerremans, 1903
- Pachyschelus deplanatus (Chevrolat, 1838)
- Pachyschelus descarpentriesi Cobos, 1956
- Pachyschelus devians Obenberger, 1925
- Pachyschelus dichrous Obenberger, 1925
- Pachyschelus dilatipennis Cobos, 1978
- Pachyschelus diversus Waterhouse, 1889
- Pachyschelus dohrni Kerremans, 1900
- Pachyschelus dubius Waterhouse, 1889
- Pachyschelus elegans Waterhouse, 1889
- Pachyschelus erichsoni Saunders, 1871
- Pachyschelus exiguus (Fabricius, 1801)
- Pachyschelus expansus Kerremans, 1896
- Pachyschelus famulus Kerremans, 1899
- Pachyschelus fasciatus (Gory, 1841)
- Pachyschelus fastidiosus Cobos, 1956
- Pachyschelus fastigiatus (Fabricius, 1801)
- Pachyschelus faustus Obenberger, 1925
- Pachyschelus fernandezyepezi Cobos, 1959
- Pachyschelus fisheri Vogt, 1949
- Pachyschelus flammeolus Obenberger, 1940
- Pachyschelus flexuosus Kerremans, 1897
- Pachyschelus foliaceus (Motschulsky, 1859)
- Pachyschelus foliivorus Obenberger, 1940
- Pachyschelus fraterculus Obenberger, 1925
- Pachyschelus freudei Cobos, 1969
- Pachyschelus frosti Fisher, 1930
- Pachyschelus fulgens Waterhouse, 1889
- Pachyschelus fulgidipennis Lucas, 1858
- Pachyschelus gemellus Kerremans, 1899
- Pachyschelus geraensis Obenberger, 1932
- Pachyschelus golbachi Cobos, 1959
- Pachyschelus granulosicollis Waterhouse, 1889
- Pachyschelus grassator Obenberger, 1925
- Pachyschelus gratus Kerremans, 1899
- Pachyschelus hansi Obenberger, 1925
- Pachyschelus hexagonalis Kerremans, 1903
- Pachyschelus horni Obenberger, 1939
- Pachyschelus huallagus Cobos, 1969
- Pachyschelus humeralis Kerremans, 1896
- Pachyschelus humerosus Obenberger, 1925
- Pachyschelus igneoapicalis Cobos, 1967
- Pachyschelus ignicollis Obenberger, 1925
- Pachyschelus inca Kerremans, 1899
- Pachyschelus incertus Waterhouse, 1889
- Pachyschelus indigaceus Kerremans, 1897
- Pachyschelus ineditus Kerremans, 1896
- Pachyschelus infidelis Obenberger, 1925
- Pachyschelus interioris Obenberger, 1925
- Pachyschelus iris Obenberger, 1925
- Pachyschelus irroratus Waterhouse, 1889
- Pachyschelus jakobsoni Obenberger, 1932
- Pachyschelus jenningsi Fisher, 1922
- Pachyschelus jucundus (Kirsch, 1873)
- Pachyschelus kaszabi Apt, 1954
- Pachyschelus kerremansi Obenberger, 1925
- Pachyschelus kheili Obenberger, 1925
- Pachyschelus kubesi Obenberger, 1925
- Pachyschelus laevigatus (Say, 1833)
- Pachyschelus laticeps Waterhouse, 1889
- Pachyschelus levis Kerremans, 1896
- Pachyschelus lineifrons Obenberger, 1925
- Pachyschelus littoreus Obenberger, 1925
- Pachyschelus loretanus Obenberger, 1932
- Pachyschelus lucidulus (Fabricius, 1801)
- Pachyschelus luctosus Lucas, 1859
- Pachyschelus lunifer Waterhouse, 1889
- Pachyschelus maculatus (Laporte & Gory, 1840)
- Pachyschelus maculifer Obenberger, 1925
- Pachyschelus magdalenae Obenberger, 1925
- Pachyschelus mandarinus Théry, 1936
- Pachyschelus marginicollis (Gory, 1841)
- Pachyschelus martinezi Cobos, 1958
- Pachyschelus melas Deyrolle, 1864
- Pachyschelus meridionalis Obenberger, 1925
- Pachyschelus mexicanus Fisher, 1922
- Pachyschelus migneauxii Deyrolle, 1864
- Pachyschelus mimus Obenberger, 1925
- Pachyschelus minans Obenberger, 1940
- Pachyschelus minator Obenberger, 1932
- Pachyschelus minimus Lucas, 1858
- Pachyschelus modicus Kerremans, 1899
- Pachyschelus mrazi Obenberger, 1925
- Pachyschelus nemoralis Obenberger, 1925
- Pachyschelus nicki Cobos, 1958
- Pachyschelus nicolayi Obenberger, 1925
- Pachyschelus nigricollis Waterhouse, 1889
- Pachyschelus nigriventris Fisher, 1925
- Pachyschelus nitidus Kerremans, 1903
- Pachyschelus nodifer Kerremans, 1896
- Pachyschelus nonfriedi Obenberger, 1925
- Pachyschelus novus Kerremans, 1897
- Pachyschelus nudus Fisher, 1925
- Pachyschelus obenbergeri Apt, 1954
- Pachyschelus obscurellus Kerremans, 1896
- Pachyschelus obsoletepilosus Fisher, 1922
- Pachyschelus occidentalis Kerremans, 1899
- Pachyschelus octodon Obenberger, 1925
- Pachyschelus ogloblini Obenberger, 1932
- Pachyschelus ophthalmicus Cobos, 1978
- Pachyschelus orientalis Obenberger, 1924
- Pachyschelus ornatus Lucas, 1859
- Pachyschelus pamparum Obenberger, 1925
- Pachyschelus panamensis Fisher, 1922
- Pachyschelus paraarcuatus Cobos, 1978
- Pachyschelus paramimus Obenberger, 1932
- Pachyschelus paranaensis Obenberger, 1932
- Pachyschelus paulensis Obenberger, 1925
- Pachyschelus peruvianus Kerremans, 1899
- Pachyschelus piceolus Obenberger, 1925
- Pachyschelus pici Obenberger, 1925
- Pachyschelus pictus Kerremans, 1896
- Pachyschelus pittieri Fisher, 1930
- Pachyschelus planatus Kerremans, 1903
- Pachyschelus planus Kerremans, 1899
- Pachyschelus plaumanni Obenberger, 1940
- Pachyschelus problematicus Cobos, 1959
- Pachyschelus prodigiosus Obenberger, 1925
- Pachyschelus proximulus Obenberger, 1925
- Pachyschelus proximus Kerremans, 1897
- Pachyschelus psychotriae Fisher, 1931
- Pachyschelus pubicollis Waterhouse, 1889
- Pachyschelus pulchellus (Fabricius, 1801)
- Pachyschelus pulcher Obenberger, 1925
- Pachyschelus pulicarius (Gory, 1841)
- Pachyschelus pulverulentus Kerremans, 1896
- Pachyschelus puniceus Hespenheide, 1990
- Pachyschelus purpureipennis Waterhouse, 1889
- Pachyschelus purpureus (Say, 1833)
- Pachyschelus pusillus (Fabricius, 1798)
- Pachyschelus pygmaeus (Degeer, 1774)
- Pachyschelus quadripunctatus Cobos, 1959
- Pachyschelus rambouseki Obenberger, 1925
- Pachyschelus rarus Obenberger, 1925
- Pachyschelus rectipleuris Obenberger, 1925
- Pachyschelus reflexus Kerremans, 1903
- Pachyschelus repentinus Thomson, 1879
- Pachyschelus rotundatus Kerremans, 1889
- Pachyschelus roubali Obenberger, 1913
- Pachyschelus schenklingi Obenberger, 1925
- Pachyschelus schmidtianus Cobos, 1961
- Pachyschelus schwarzi Kerremans, 1892
- Pachyschelus schwarzti Kerremans, 1892
- Pachyschelus scintillans Kerremans, 1896
- Pachyschelus secedens Waterhouse, 1889
- Pachyschelus sedai Obenberger, 1925
- Pachyschelus signatus Waterhouse, 1889
- Pachyschelus silvicolus Obenberger, 1925
- Pachyschelus similans Obenberger, 1925
- Pachyschelus simplex Kerremans, 1896
- Pachyschelus sinicus Obenberger, 1940
- Pachyschelus skrlandti Obenberger, 1925
- Pachyschelus skrlandtianus Obenberger, 1934
- Pachyschelus solarii Théry, 1923
- Pachyschelus solitarius Kerremans, 1894
- Pachyschelus splendens (Motschulsky, 1859)
- Pachyschelus steinbachi Obenberger, 1932
- Pachyschelus sticticus Waterhouse, 1889
- Pachyschelus strandi Obenberger, 1925
- Pachyschelus strandiellus Obenberger, 1932
- Pachyschelus subatratus Cobos, 1990
- Pachyschelus subcyaneus (Motschulsky, 1859)
- Pachyschelus sublatus Obenberger, 1925
- Pachyschelus subopacus Fisher, 1922
- Pachyschelus subtilis Obenberger, 1925
- Pachyschelus subundulatus Kerremans, 1896
- Pachyschelus sulcifrons Fisher, 1922
- Pachyschelus sumatraensis Fisher, 1926
- Pachyschelus superbus Cobos, 1967
- Pachyschelus takanus Fisher, 1925
- Pachyschelus tarsalis Obenberger, 1925
- Pachyschelus terminans (Fabricius, 1801)
- Pachyschelus tinctipennis Obenberger, 1925
- Pachyschelus tonkinensis Théry, 1936
- Pachyschelus transversus Kerremans, 1896
- Pachyschelus trapezoidalis Waterhouse, 1889
- Pachyschelus trifasciatus Thomson, 1879
- Pachyschelus truncatus Kerremans, 1896
- Pachyschelus uhmanni Obenberger, 1939
- Pachyschelus undatus Obenberger, 1925
- Pachyschelus undularius Burmeister, 1872
- Pachyschelus undulatus Waterhouse, 1889
- Pachyschelus unguicularis Obenberger, 1925
- Pachyschelus unicolor Fisher, 1922
- Pachyschelus unifasciatus Fisher, 1922
- Pachyschelus urvilleae Kogan, 1964
- Pachyschelus valentinorum Hespenheide & Bellamy, 2004
- Pachyschelus valerio Fisher, 1933
- Pachyschelus valkai Obenberger, 1925
- Pachyschelus vanrooni Obenberger, 1923
- Pachyschelus vezenyii Apt, 1954
- Pachyschelus vicinellus Obenberger, 1940
- Pachyschelus vicinus Kerremans, 1903
- Pachyschelus violaceotinctus Cobos, 1959
- Pachyschelus violaceus (Gory & Laporte, 1840)
- Pachyschelus virens (Kirsch, 1873)
- Pachyschelus viridanus Thomson, 1878
- Pachyschelus viridescens (Kirsch, 1873)
- Pachyschelus viridicollis (Gory, 1841)
- Pachyschelus viridulus (Kirsch, 1873)
- Pachyschelus vogti Hespenheide, 2003
- Pachyschelus weyersi Kerremans, 1900
- Pachyschelus weyrauchi Cobos, 1969
- Pachyschelus winteri Obenberger, 1925
