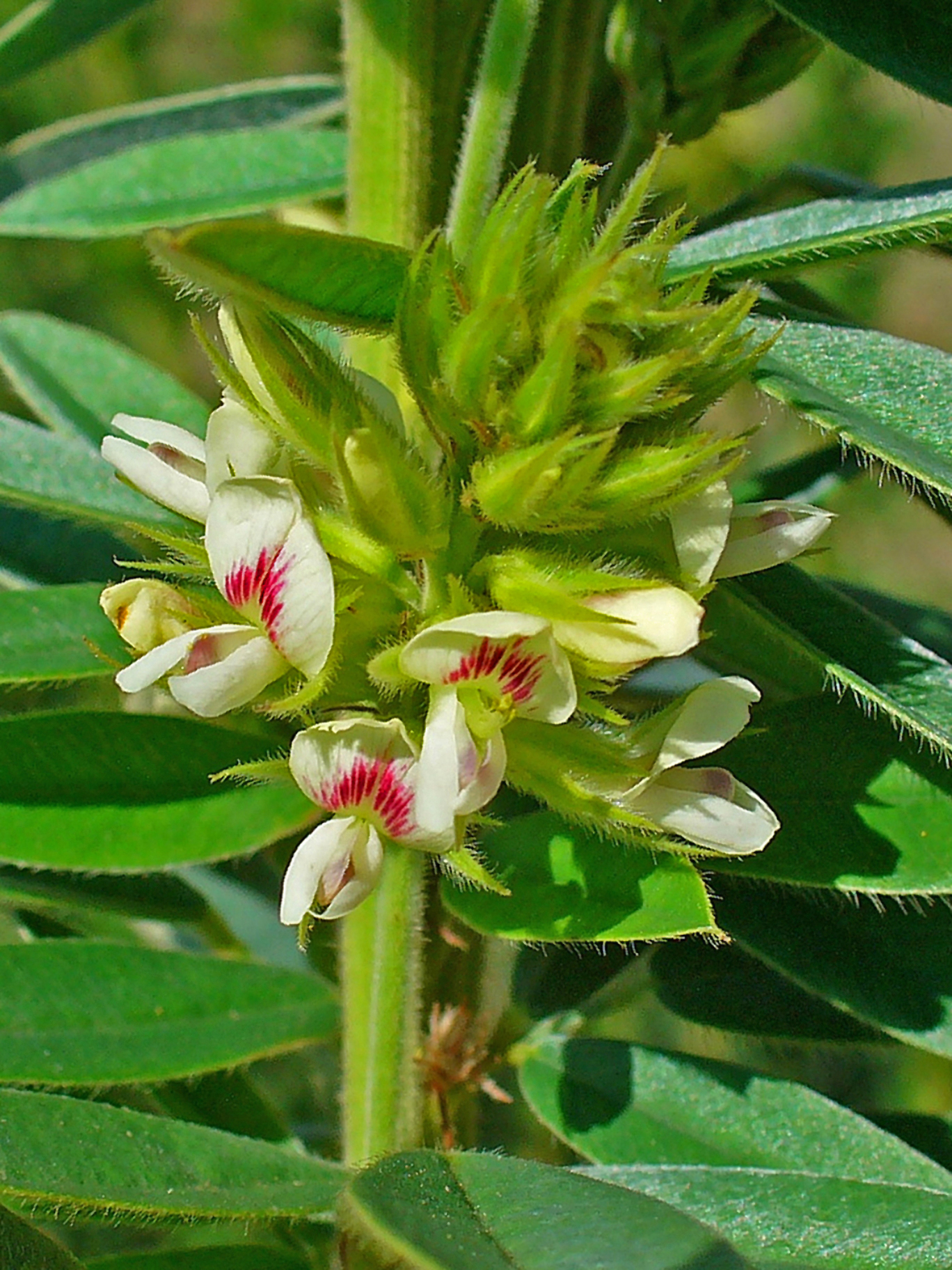

Conservation status
- Secure (NatureServe)

Scientific classification
- Kingdom: Plantae
- Clade: Tracheophytes
- Clade: Angiosperms
- Clade: Eudicots
- Clade: Rosids
- Order: Fabales
- Family: Fabaceae
- Subfamily: Faboideae
- Genus: Lespedeza
- Species: L. capitata

Binomial name
- Lespedeza capitata Michx. (1803)

Synonyms
- Synonymy: Aeschynomene frutescens Poir. (1798); Despeleza capitata (Michx.) Nieuwl. (1914); Hedysarum conglomeratum Poir. (1805); Hedysarum frutescens Willd. (1803), nom. illeg.; Hedysarum umbellatum Walter (1788), sensu auct.; Lespedeza bicknellii House (1905); Lespedeza capitata f. argentea Fernald (1941); Lespedeza capitata var. hirtiformis Fernald (1938); Lespedeza capitata var. sericea Hook. (1835); Lespedeza capitata var. stenophylla Bissell & Fernald (1912); Lespedeza capitata var. typica Fernald (1941), not validly publ.; Lespedeza capitata var. velutina Fernald (1908); Lespedeza capitata var. vulgaris Torr. & A.Gray (1840); Lespedeza fruticosa Pers. (1807); Lespedeza schindleri H.Lév. (1916); Lespedeza velutina E.P.Bicknell (1901), nom. illeg.

= Lespedeza capitata =

Species of legume

Lespedeza capitata is a species of flowering plant in the Fabaceae, or legume family, and is known by the common name roundhead bushclover, or roundhead lespedeza.

== Distribution and habitat ==
It is native to eastern North America, including eastern Canada and the eastern half of the United States. In the wild it grows in wooded areas, on prairies, and in disturbed habitat such as roadsides.

== Description ==
L. capitata is a perennial herb with erect stems growing up to 1.5 meters tall. The taproot may grow over two meters deep into the soil, with lateral roots reaching out one meter horizontally. The alternately arranged leaves are each made up of several leaflets. The plant is coated in silvery hairs. Flowers are borne in somewhat rounded clusters atop each stem. The flower is white with a purple spot.

== Horticulture ==
It is used as a component of seed mixes for vegetating rangeland. It is a good addition to livestock forage, as it is palatable and nutritious. The plant can also be used in flower arrangements. The cultivar 'Kanoka' was released by the USDA in 1998.

== Uses ==
This plant had a number of medicinal uses for Native American groups. It was used as a moxa to treat rheumatism. The Comanche used the leaves for tea. The Meskwaki used the roots to make an antidote for poison. The Pawnee people referred to the plant as rabbit foot (parus-asu) on account of the shape of its fruits and made a tea from the dry stems and leaves when coffee was not available. Among the Omaha and Ponca peoples, it was known as the male buffalo bellow plant.

== Ecology ==
L. capitata is tolerant of drought and fixes nitrogen. It may suffer from the rust pathogen Uromyces lespedezae-procaumbentis and the tar spot fungus Phyllachora lespedezae, as well as herbivory by the insect Pachyschelus laevigatus.

It hosts numerous Lepidoptera species, such as the eastern tailed blue, gray hairstreak, hoary edge, northern cloudywing, orange sulphur, silver-spotted skipper, southern cloudywing, and spring azure.

Its seeds are popular with several bird species, in particular the northern bobwhite.
