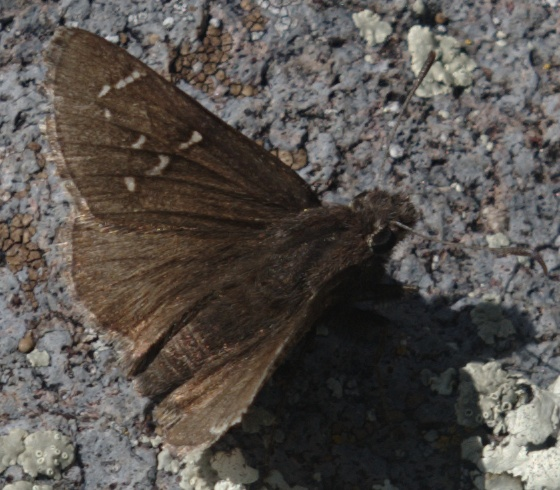

Conservation status
- Apparently Secure (NatureServe)

Scientific classification
- Kingdom: Animalia
- Phylum: Arthropoda
- Class: Insecta
- Order: Lepidoptera
- Family: Hesperiidae
- Genus: Thorybes
- Species: T. mexicana

Binomial name
- Thorybes mexicana (Herrich-Schäffer, 1869)

Synonyms
- Eudamus mexicana Herrich-Schäffer, 1869; Eudamus ananius Plötz, 1882; Thorybes mexicanus; Thorybes nevada Scudder, 1872; Eudamus aemilea Skinner, 1893; Thorybes aemilia; Thorybes confusis Bell, 1922

= Thorybes mexicana =

Species of butterfly

Thorybes mexicana, the Mexican cloudywing, mountain cloudy wing or Nevada cloudy wing, is a butterfly of the family Hesperiidae. It is found in the high elevation mountains of the western United States south into Mexico.

Subspecies confusis is often treated as a separate species, known as the confused cloudywing or eastern cloudywing' (Thorybes confusis). This subspecies is found from southeastern Pennsylvania west to Missouri, south along the Atlantic Coastal plain to central Florida, the Gulf Coast and Texas. Strays can be found up to southeastern Kansas, southern Illinois and New Jersey.

The wingspan is 29–35 millimetres (1.1–1.4 in). Adults are on wing from June to August. There is one generation per year.

The larvae feed on Trifolium, Vicia and Lathyrus species. Adults feed on flower nectar.

== Subspecies ==
- Thorybes mexicana mexicana (Mexico)
- Thorybes mexicana nevada (California, Oregon)
- Thorybes mexicana confusis (Florida) - confused cloudywing or eastern cloudywing
- Thorybes mexicana dobra (Mexico, Arizona)
- Thorybes mexicana ducia (Panama)
