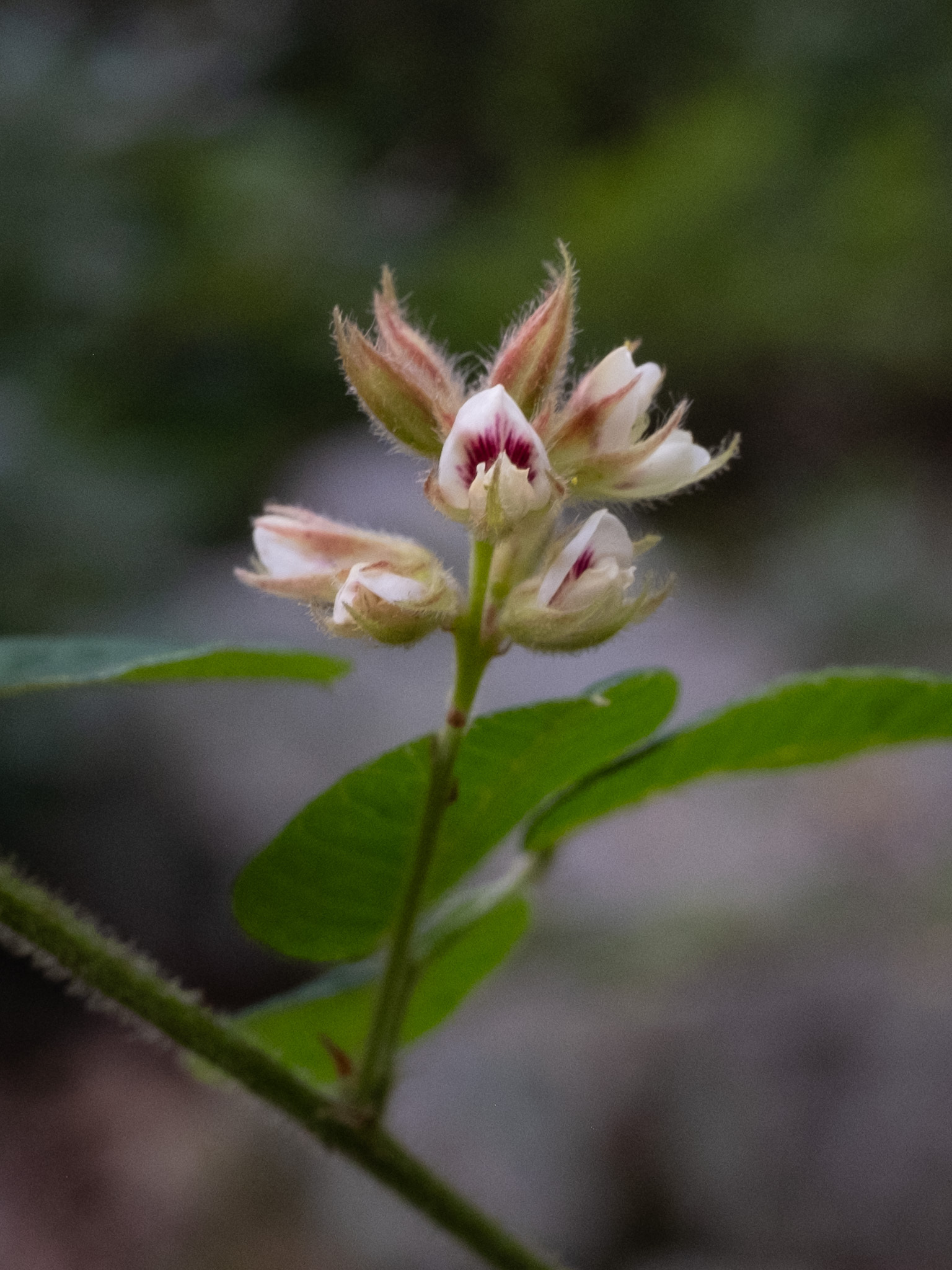

Conservation status
- Least Concern (IUCN 3.1)

Scientific classification
- Kingdom: Plantae
- Clade: Embryophytes
- Clade: Tracheophytes
- Clade: Spermatophytes
- Clade: Angiosperms
- Clade: Eudicots
- Clade: Rosids
- Order: Fabales
- Family: Fabaceae
- Subfamily: Faboideae
- Genus: Lespedeza
- Species: L. hirta

Binomial name
- Lespedeza hirta (L.) Hornem. (1815)

Synonyms
- Synonymy: Despeleza hirta (L.) Nieuwl. (1914); Hedysarum hirtum L. (1753); Lespedeza angustifolia Nutt. (1873), not validly publ.; Lespedeza capitata var. calycina (Schindl.) (1941); Lespedeza hirta var. appressipilis S.F.Blake (1924); Lespedeza hirta var. calycina Schindl. (1913); Lespedeza hirta var. curtissii (Clewell) Isely (1986); Lespedeza hirta subsp. curtissii Clewell (1964); Lespedeza hirta var. dissimulans Fernald (1941); Lespedeza hirta var. sparsiflora Torr. & A.Gray (1840); Lespedeza hirta var. typica Schindl. (1913), not validly publ.; Lespedeza polystachya Michx. (1803); Onobrychis hirta (L.) Scop. (1777)

= Lespedeza hirta =

Species of legume

Lespedeza hirta, the hairy lespedeza or hairy bush clover, is a perennial forb native to Ontario and the eastern United States. It grows at most three feet high. It has inconspicuous small white blooms in the summer and prefers average to dry soil. It is noteworthy for the number of Lepidoptera species it supports. It is a larval host to the bella moth, black-spotted prominent moth, cloudless sulpher, confused cloudy-wing, eastern tailed blue, gray hairstreak, southern cloudywing, and zarucco duskywing.

== Ecology ==
Lespedeza hirta is insect pollinated and is recorded to have been visited in northern Florida by Anthidiellum notatum, Ceratina, Megachile exilis, Megachile georgica, Megachile petulans, Stelis louisae, and Trachusa ridingsii.
