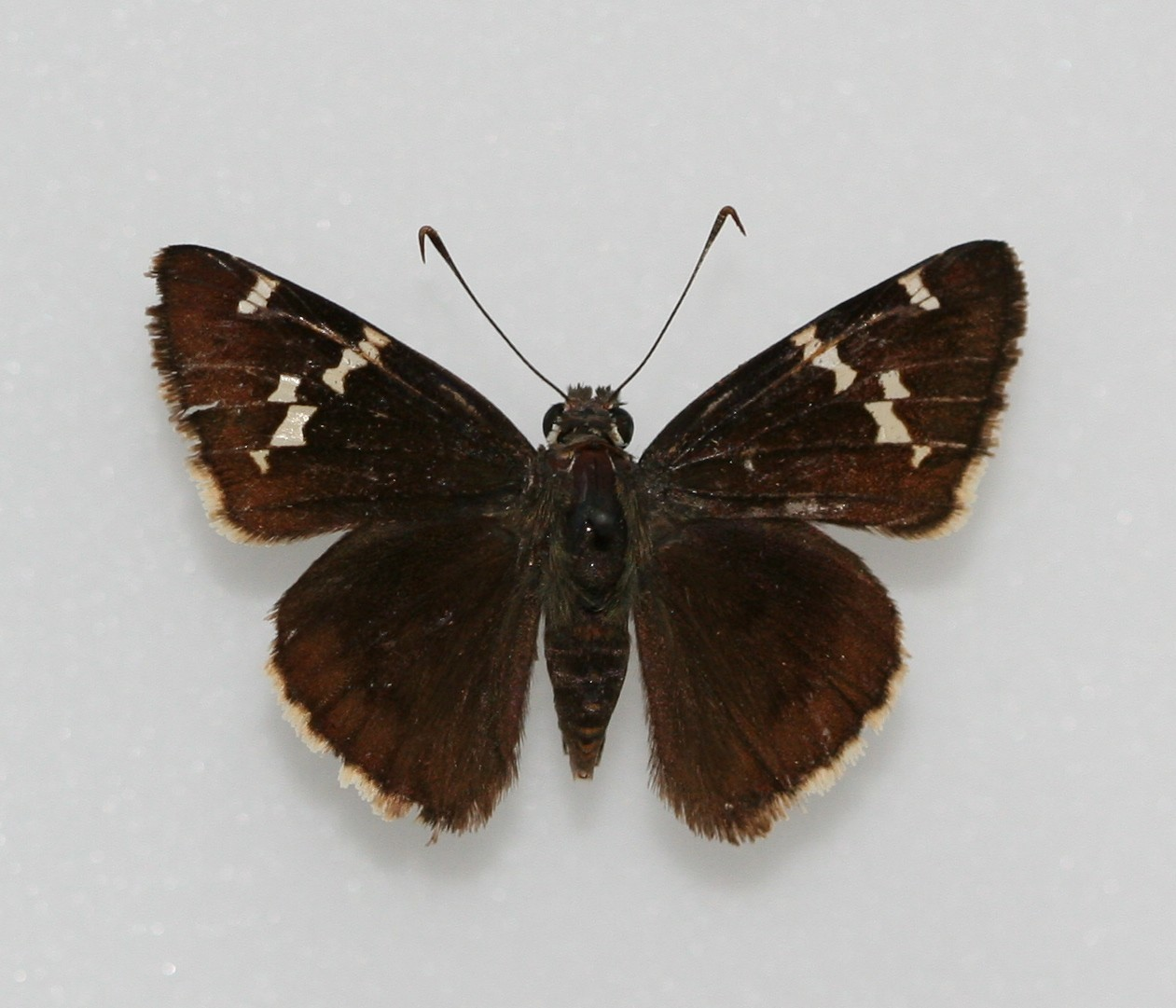
- Thorybes bathyllus

Scientific classification
- Kingdom: Animalia
- Phylum: Arthropoda
- Class: Insecta
- Order: Lepidoptera
- Family: Hesperiidae
- Subfamily: Eudaminae
- Genus: Thorybes; Scudder, 1872

= Thorybes =

Genus of skipper butterflies in subfamily Eudaminae

Thorybes is a genus of skippers in the family Hesperiidae subfamily Eudaminae.

== Species ==
- Thorybes bathyllus (Smith, 1797) - southern cloudywing
- Thorybes confusis E. Bell, 1923 – confused cloudywing Florida
- Thorybes diversus Bell, 1927 - western cloudywing
- Thorybes drusius (Edwards, 1883) - Drusius cloudywing Southeast Arizona, Southwest New Mexico, West Texas, Mexico.
- Thorybes mexicana (Herrich-Schäffer, 1869)
- Thorybes pylades (Scudder, 1870) - northern cloudywing
