= Pachyschelus nicolayi =

Scientific classification
- Domain: Eukaryota
- Kingdom: Animalia
- Phylum: Arthropoda
- Class: Insecta
- Order: Coleoptera
- Suborder: Polyphaga
- Infraorder: Elateriformia
- Family: Buprestidae
- Genus: Pachyschelus
- Species: P. nicolayi

Binomial name
- Pachyschelus nicolayi Obenberger, 1925

Species of beetle

Pachyschelus nicolayi is a species of metallic wood-boring beetle in the family Buprestidae. It is found in North America.
