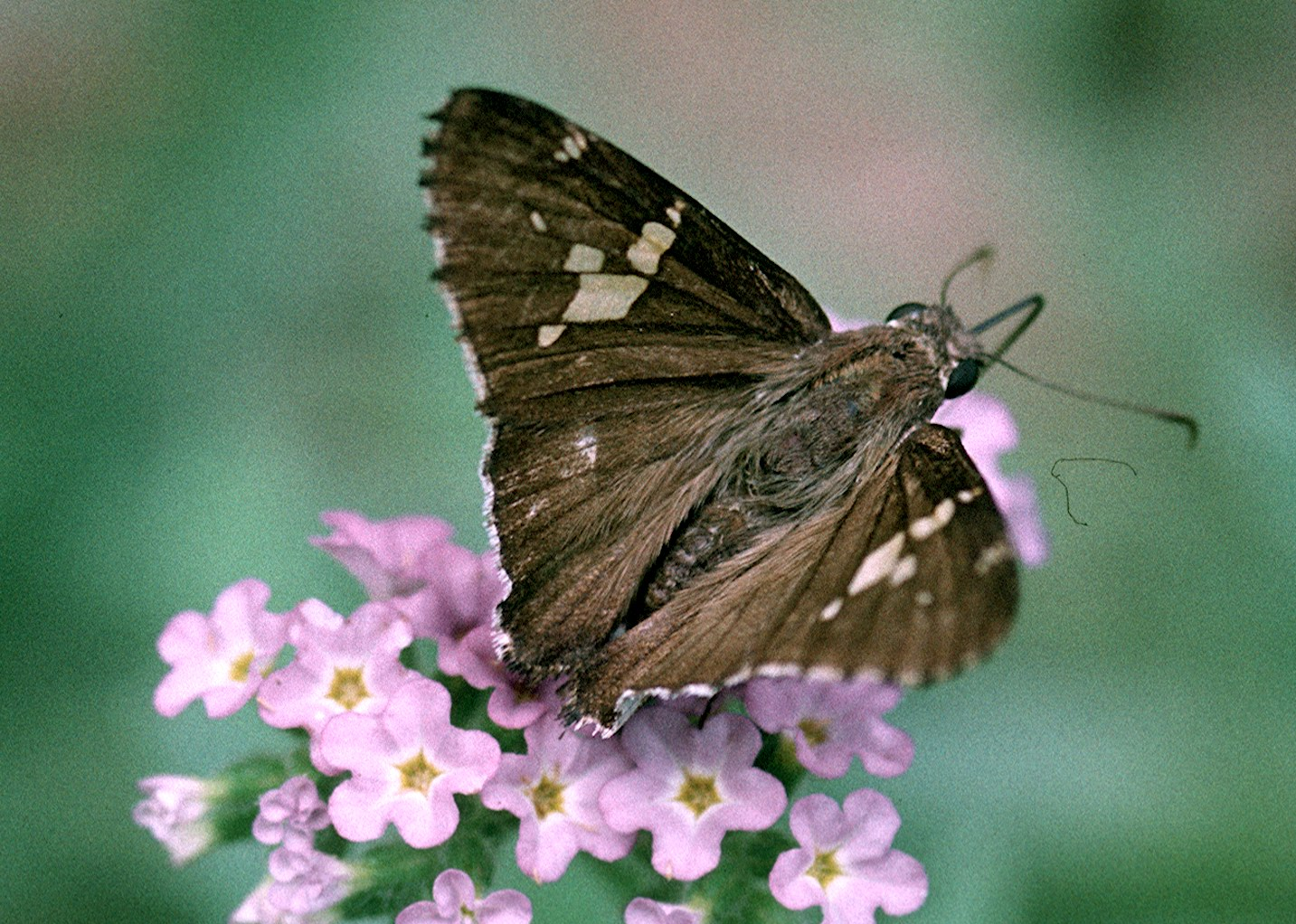
- Cecropterus lyciades

Scientific classification
- Kingdom: Animalia
- Phylum: Arthropoda
- Class: Insecta
- Order: Lepidoptera
- Family: Hesperiidae
- Genus: Cecropterus; Herrich-Schäffer, 1869

= Cecropterus =

Genus of butterflies

Cecropterus is a genus of skippers in the family Hesperiidae, within which it is placed in subtribe Eudamina. It has three subgenera: Cecropterus, Thorybes and Murgaria.

== Species ==
As of 2019, the genus holds the following species:

Subgenus Cecropterus:

- Cecropterus acanthopoda (O. Mielke, 1977)
- Cecropterus rinta (Evans, 1952)
- Cecropterus zarex (Hübner, 1818)
- Cecropterus longipennis Plötz, 1882
- Cecropterus evenus (Ménétriés, 1855)

Subgenus Thorybes:

- Cecropterus lyciades (Geyer, 1832)
- Cecropterus casica (Herrich-Schäffer, 1869)
- Cecropterus tehuacana (Draudt, 1922)
- Cecropterus confusis (E. Bell, 1923)
- Cecropterus bathyllus (J. E. Smith, 1797)
- Cecropterus mexicana (Herrich-Schäffer, 1869)
  - Cecropterus mexicana aemilea (Skinner, 1893)
  - Cecropterus mexicana blanca (Scott, 1981)
  - Cecropterus mexicana nevada (Scudder, 1872)
  - Cecropterus mexicana dobra (Evans, 1952)
  - Cecropterus mexicana mexicana (Herrich-Schäffer, 1869)
  - Cecropterus mexicana ducia (Evans, 1952)
- Cecropterus diversus (E. Bell, 1927)
- Cecropterus pylades (Scudder, 1870)
  - Cecropterus pylades indistinctus (Austin & J. Emmel, 1998)
  - Cecropterus pylades albosuffusa (H. Freeman, 1943)
  - Cecropterus pylades pylades (Scudder, 1870)
- Cecropterus drusius (W. H. Edwards, [1884])
- Cecropterus cincta Plötz, 1882
- Cecropterus vectilucis (A. Butler, 1872)
- Cecropterus pseudocellus (Coolidge & Clemence, [1910])
- Cecropterus palliolum (H. Druce, 1908)
- Cecropterus egregius (A. Butler, 1870)
  - Cecropterus egregius egregius (A. Butler, 1870)
  - Cecropterus egregius coxeyi (R. Williams, 1931)
- Cecropterus virescens (Mabille, 1877)
- Cecropterus dorantes (Stoll, 1790)
  - Cecropterus dorantes calafia (R. Williams, 1926)
  - Cecropterus dorantes dorantes (Stoll, 1790)
  - Cecropterus dorantes cramptoni (W. Comstock, 1944)
  - Cecropterus dorantes santiago (Lucas, 1857)
  - Cecropterus dorantes galapagensis (F. Williams, 1911)
- Cecropterus obscurus (Hewitson, 1867)

Subgenus Murgaria:

- Cecropterus albociliatus (Mabille, 1877)
  - Cecropterus albociliatus albociliatus (Mabille, 1877)
  - Cecropterus albociliatus leucophrys (Mabille, 1898)
  - Cecropterus albociliatus nocera (Plötz, 1882)
- Cecropterus toxeus (Plötz, 1882)
- Cecropterus jalapus (Plötz, 1881)
- Cecropterus athesis (Hewitson, 1867)
- Cecropterus phalaecus (Godman & Salvin, 1893)
- Cecropterus reductus (N. Riley, 1919)
- Cecropterus doryssus (Swainson, 1831)
  - Cecropterus doryssus chales (Godman & Salvin, 1893)
  - Cecropterus doryssus doryssus (Swainson, 1831)
  - Cecropterus doryssus albicuspis (Herrich-Schäffer, 1869)
- Cecropterus albimargo (Mabille, 1875)
- Cecropterus takuta (Evans, 1952)
- Cecropterus rica (Evans, 1952)
- Cecropterus trebia (Möschler, 1879)
- Cecropterus carmelita (Herrich-Schäffer, 1869)
- Cecropterus barra (Evans, 1952)
