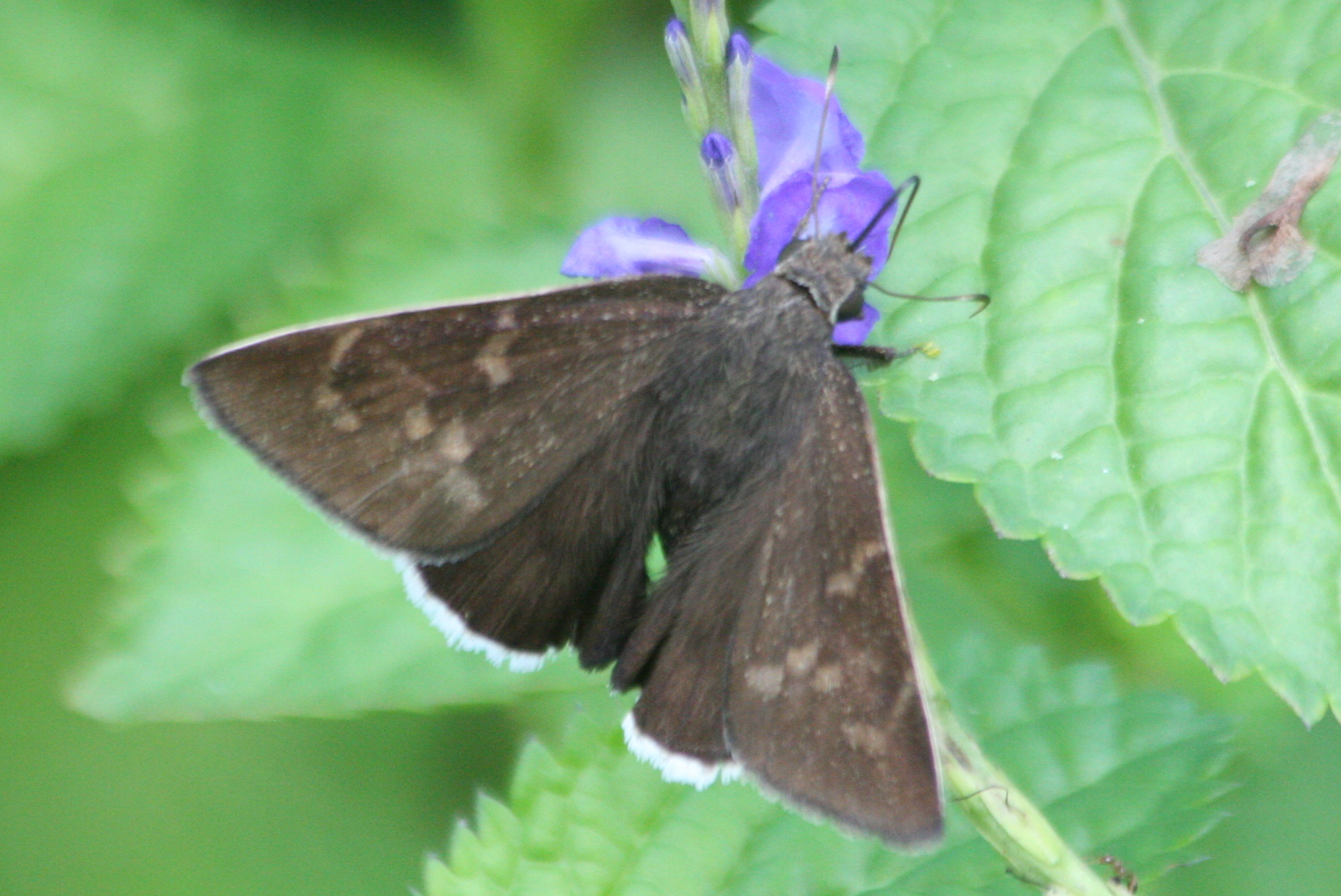

Scientific classification
- Kingdom: Animalia
- Phylum: Arthropoda
- Class: Insecta
- Order: Lepidoptera
- Family: Hesperiidae
- Genus: Cecropterus
- Species: C. toxeus

Binomial name
- Cecropterus toxeus (Plötz, 1882)

Synonyms
- List: Aethilla toxeus Plötz, 1882; Eudamus coyote Skinner, 1892; Murgaria albociliata var. nigrociliata Mabille & Boullet, 1912; Thorybes coyote Dyar, 1903; Achalarus negrociliata dos Passos, 1964; Achalarus toxeus (Plötz, 1882)

= Cecropterus toxeus =

Species of butterfly

Cecropterus toxeus, also known as the coyote cloudywing or coyote skipper, is a species of butterfly in the family Hesperiidae. It is found from Panama, north through Central America and Mexico to central Texas. Strays can be found up to southern Arizona.

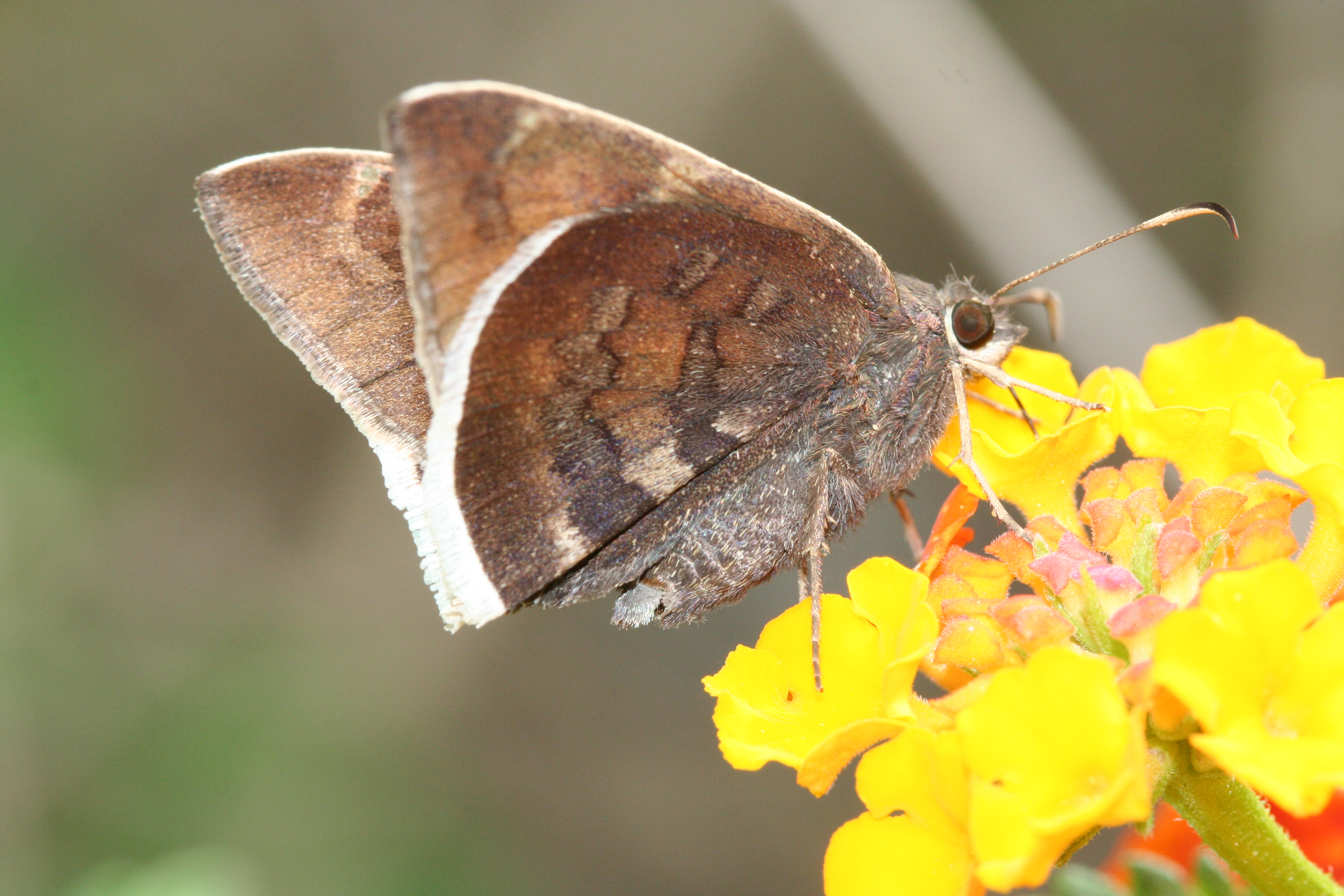

The wingspan is 42–50 mm. Adults are on wing from February to November. There are three generations per year.

The caterpillars feed on young leaves of Ebenopsis ebano. Adults feed on flower nectar.
