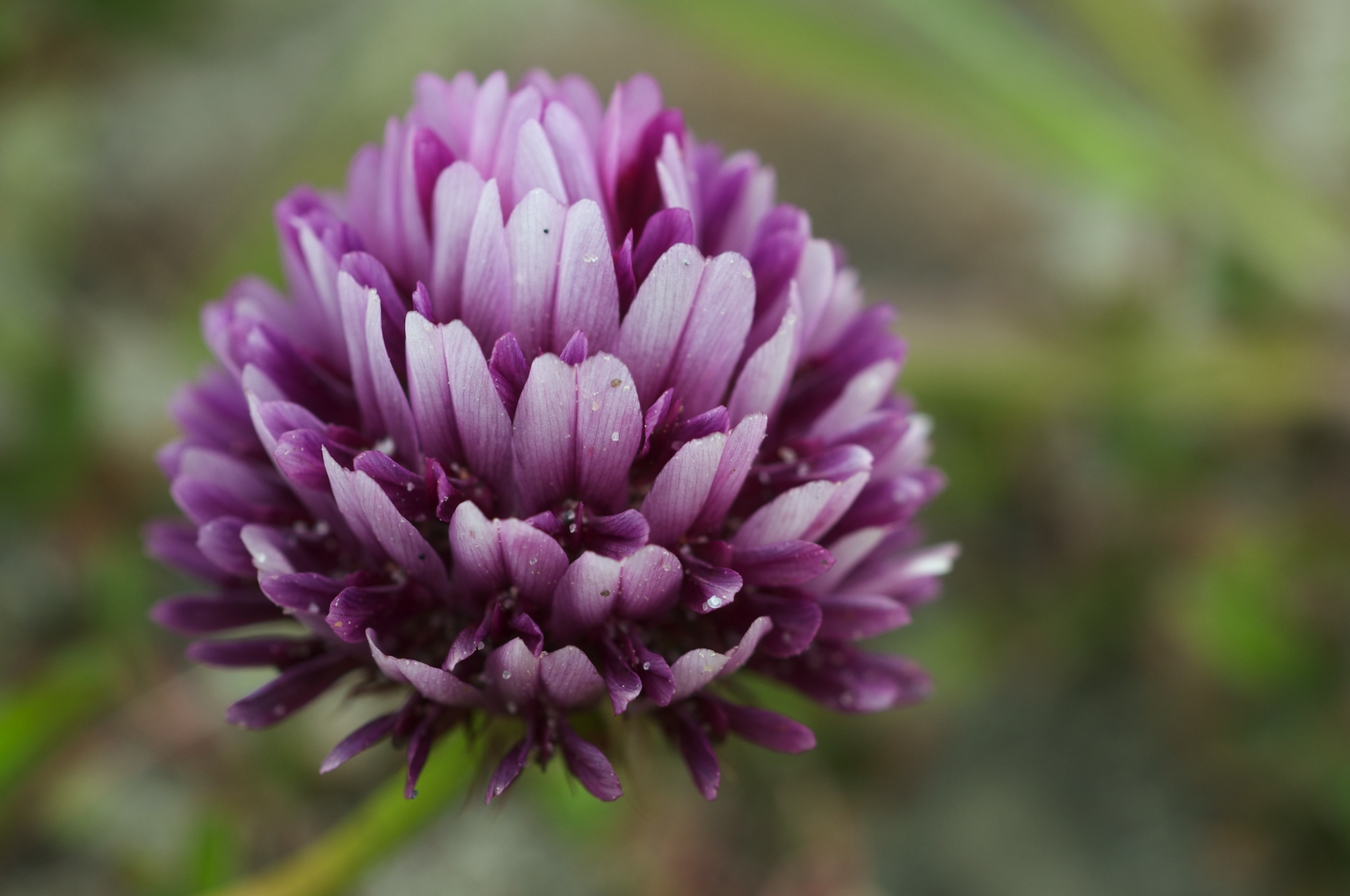

Conservation status
- Secure (NatureServe)

Scientific classification
- Kingdom: Plantae
- Clade: Tracheophytes
- Clade: Angiosperms
- Clade: Eudicots
- Clade: Rosids
- Order: Fabales
- Family: Fabaceae
- Subfamily: Faboideae
- Genus: Trifolium
- Species: T. wormskioldii

Binomial name
- Trifolium wormskioldii Lehm.

Synonyms
- List: Lupinaster wormskioldii C.Presl (1831); Trifolium atropurpureum Nutt. ex Torr. & A.Gray (1838); Trifolium calocephalum Nutt. ex Torr. & A.Gray (1838); Trifolium fendleri Greene (1897); Trifolium fimbriatum Lindl. (1827); Trifolium fistulosum A.E.Vaughan (1939); Trifolium heterodon Torr. & A.Gray (1838); Trifolium involucratum var. fendleri (Greene) McDermott (1910); Trifolium involucratum var. fimbriatum (Lindl.) McDermott (1910); Trifolium involucratum var. heterodon (Torr. & A.Gray) S.Watson (1876); Trifolium involucratum var. kennedianum McDermott (1910); Trifolium kennedianum (McDermott) A.Nelson & J.F.Macbr. (1916); Trifolium ortegae Greene (1897); Trifolium ortegae f. pumilum A.E.Vaughan (1939); Trifolium spinulosum Douglas (1831); Trifolium triste Nutt. (1838); Trifolium willdenovii var. fimbriatum (Lindl.) Ewan (1943); Trifolium willdenovii var. kennedianum (McDermott) Ewan (1943); Trifolium wormskioldii var. fimbriatum (Lindl.) Jeps. (1936); Trifolium wormskioldii var. kennedianum (McDermott) Jeps. (1936); Trifolium wormskioldii var. ortegae (Greene) Barneby (1989)

= Trifolium wormskioldii =

Plant species in the pea family

Trifolium wormskioldii is a species of clover native to the western half of North America. Its common names include cows clover, coast clover, sand clover, seaside clover, springbank clover, and Wormskjold's clover.

== Description ==
Trifolium wormskioldii, a legume, is a perennial herb sometimes taking a matlike form, with decumbent or upright stems. The leaves are made up of leaflets measuring 1 to 3 centimetres (1/2 to 1 1/4 inches) long. The lower stipules are tipped with bristles and the upper stipules may be toothed.

The rounded inflorescences are 2 to 3 cm (3/4 to 1 1/4 in) wide. The sepals are bristle-tipped. The corollas are pinkish purple or magenta with white tips.

== Etymology ==
The species was given its scientific name in honour of the Danish botanist Morten Wormskjold.

== Distribution and habitat ==
This plant is native to the western half of North America from Alaska, through California, to Mexico. It is a perennial herb that grows in many locales, from beaches to mountain ridges, below about 3,200 metres (10,500 ft) in elevation.

Habitats it grows in include chaparral, oak woodland, grassland, yellow pine forest, red fir forest, lodgepole forest, subalpine forest, and wetland−riparian.

== Uses ==
Many Native American groups of western North America use this clover for food. The herbage and flowers are eaten raw, sometimes salted. The roots are commonly steamed or boiled and eaten with fish, fish eggs, and fish grease.

This species is host to the caterpillar of the Western cloudywing butterfly (Thorybes diversus).

== Propagation ==
The seeds germinate at 75F without the need for cold treatment or other dormancy breaking mechanism.
