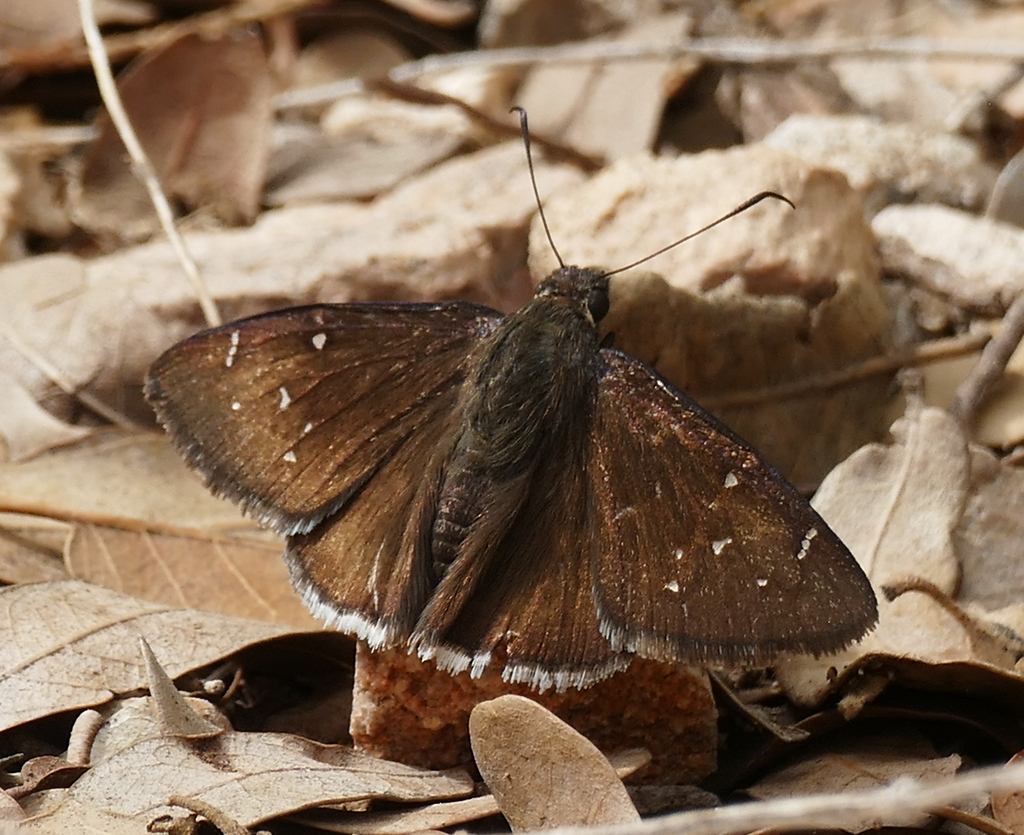

Scientific classification
- Kingdom: Animalia
- Phylum: Arthropoda
- Class: Insecta
- Order: Lepidoptera
- Family: Hesperiidae
- Genus: Thorybes
- Species: T. drusius

Binomial name
- Thorybes drusius (W. H. Edwards, 1884)

Synonyms
- Thorybes paucipuncta Dyar, 1917

= Thorybes drusius =

Species of butterfly

Thorybes drusius, the drusius cloudywing, is a species of dicot skipper in the butterfly family Hesperiidae. It is found in Central America and North America.

The MONA or Hodges number for Thorybes drusius is 3914.
