= Pachyschelus secedens =

Scientific classification
- Domain: Eukaryota
- Kingdom: Animalia
- Phylum: Arthropoda
- Class: Insecta
- Order: Coleoptera
- Suborder: Polyphaga
- Infraorder: Elateriformia
- Family: Buprestidae
- Genus: Pachyschelus
- Species: P. secedens

Binomial name
- Pachyschelus secedens Waterhouse, 1889

Synonyms
- Pachyschelus chapuisi (Dugès, 1891); Pachyschelus dugesi Théry, 1923; Pachyschelus oculatus Schaeffer, 1909

Species of beetle

Pachyschelus secedens is a species of metallic wood-boring beetle in the family Buprestidae. It is found in Central America and North America.
