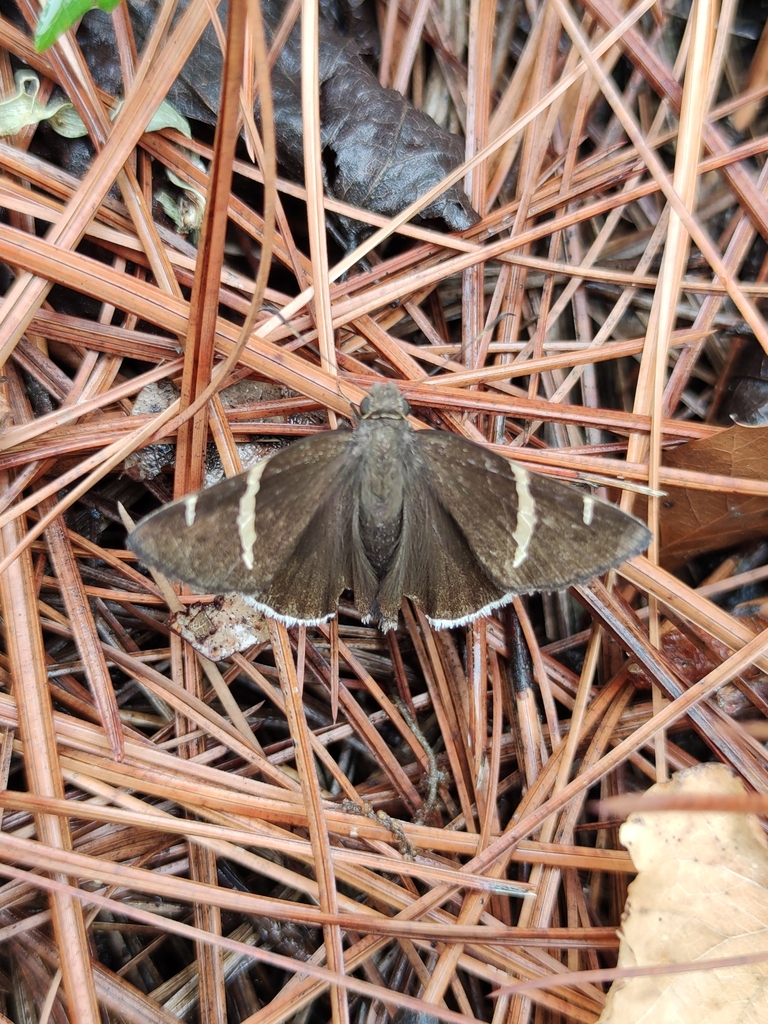

Scientific classification
- Kingdom: Animalia
- Phylum: Arthropoda
- Class: Insecta
- Order: Lepidoptera
- Family: Hesperiidae
- Genus: Cecropterus
- Species: C. cincta

Binomial name
- Cecropterus cincta Plötz, 1882

Synonyms
- Telegonus rotundatus Mabille, 1883; Autochton cincta (Plötz, 1882)

= Cecropterus cincta =

Species of butterfly

Cecropterus cincta, the chisos banded skipper, is a species of dicot skipper in the butterfly family Hesperiidae. It is found in Central America and North America.
