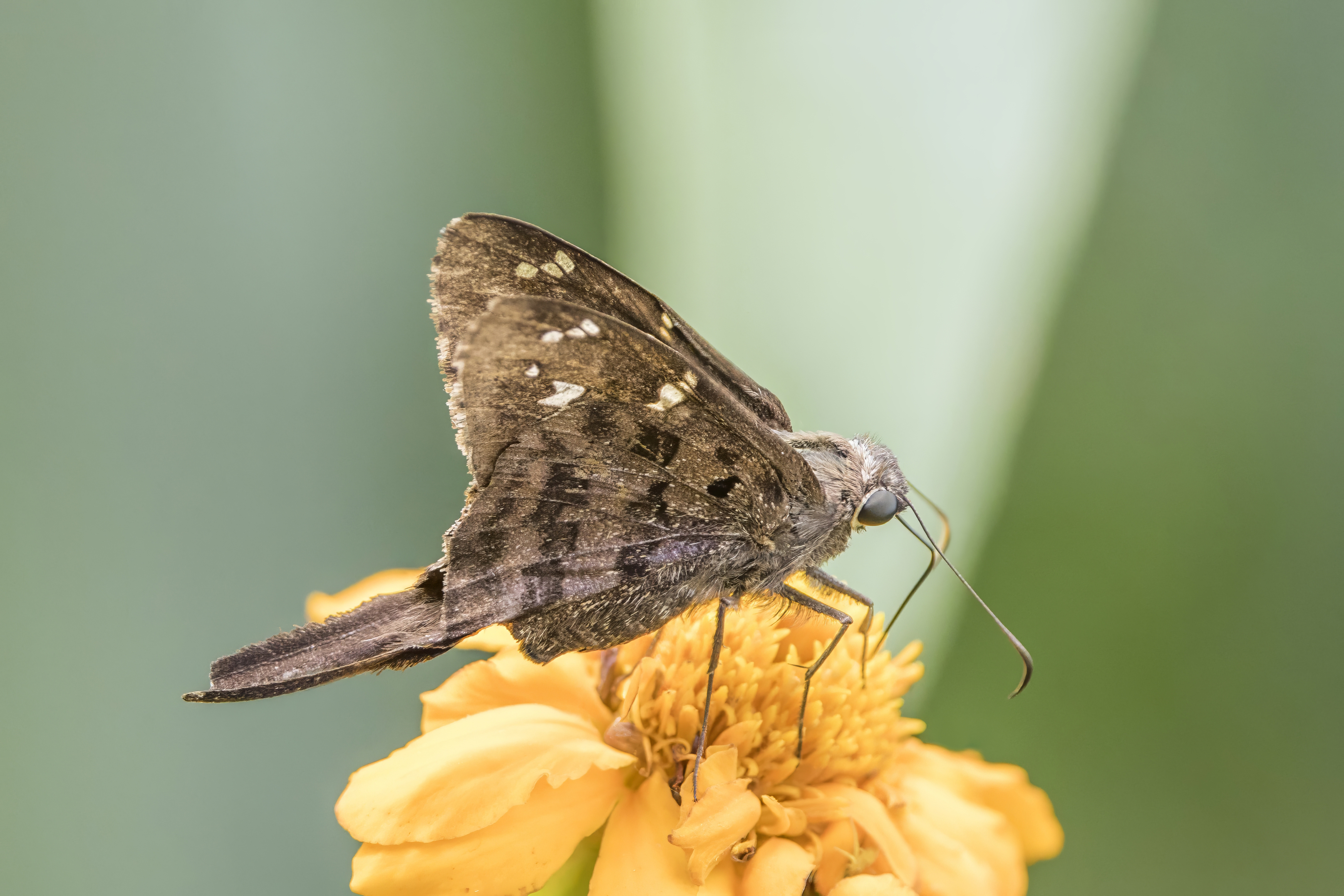
- Cecropterus dorantes dorantes in Ecuador
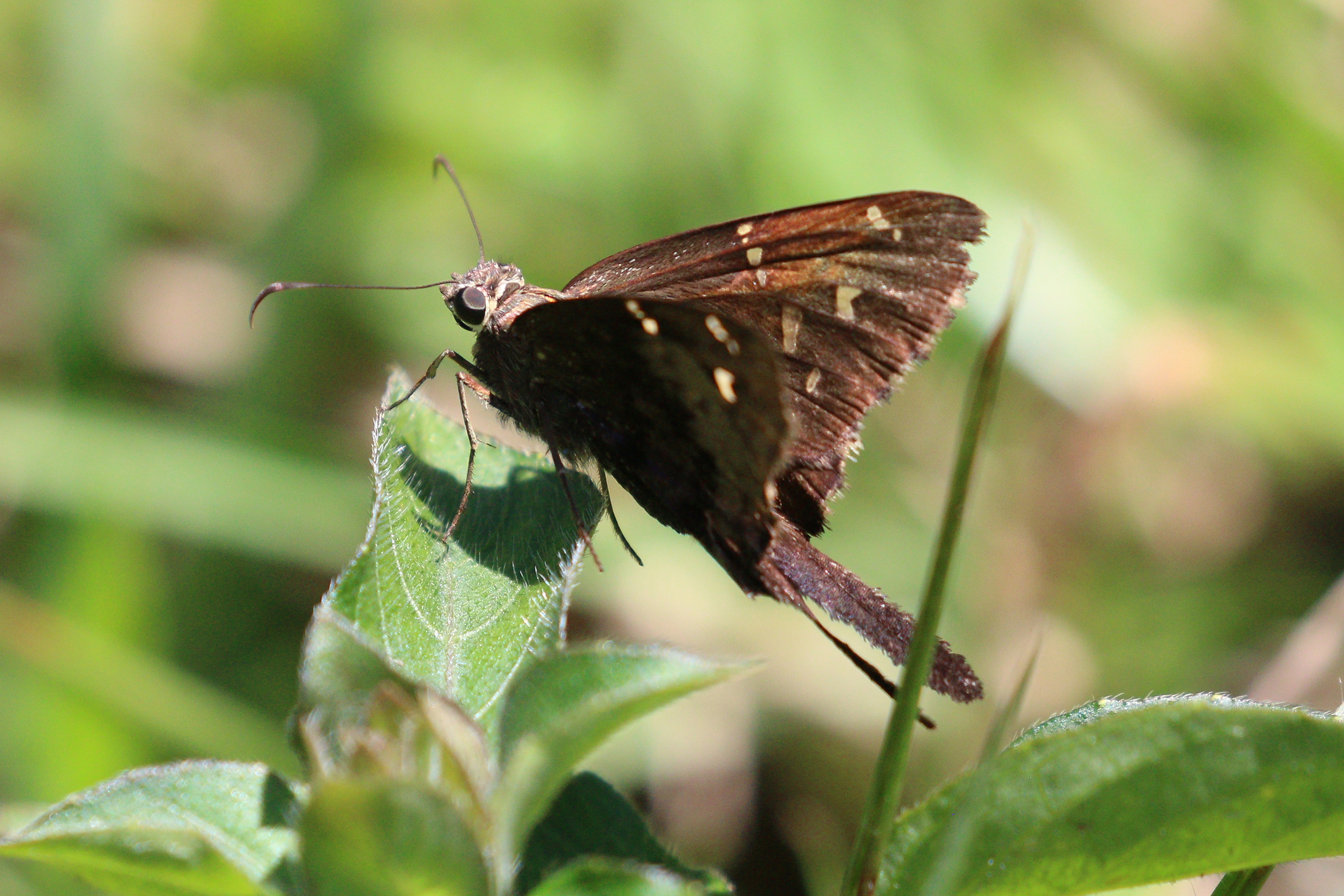
- Cecropterus dorantes santiago in Cuba

Conservation status
- Secure (NatureServe)

Scientific classification
- Kingdom: Animalia
- Phylum: Arthropoda
- Class: Insecta
- Order: Lepidoptera
- Family: Hesperiidae
- Genus: Cecropterus
- Species: C. dorantes

Binomial name
- Cecropterus dorantes (Stoll, [1790])

Synonyms
- List: Papilio dorantes Stoll, [1790]; Goniurus dorantes (Stoll, [1790]); Eudamus dorantes (Stoll, [1790]); Goniurus torones Hübner, 1821; Eudamus atletes C. & R. Felder, 1862; Eudamus amisus Hewitson, 1867; Eudamus protillus Herrich-Schäffer, 1869; Goniurus retractus Plötz, 1880; Goniurus kefersteinii Plötz, 1880; Goniurus cariosa Herrich-Schäffer, 1862; Goniurus corydon Butler, 1870; Eudamus brevicaudata Lathy, 1904; Eudamus parvus Skinner, 1920; Eudamus galapagensis Williams, 1911; Urbanus galapagensis; Urbanus dorantes Stoll, 1790

= Cecropterus dorantes =

Species of butterfly

Cecropterus dorantes, the lilac-banded longtail or Dorantes longtail, is a species of butterfly in the family Hesperiidae. It is found from Argentina, north through Central America, Mexico, and the West Indies to southern Texas and peninsular Florida. Strays can be found as far north as northern California, southern Arizona, southern Missouri and North Carolina.

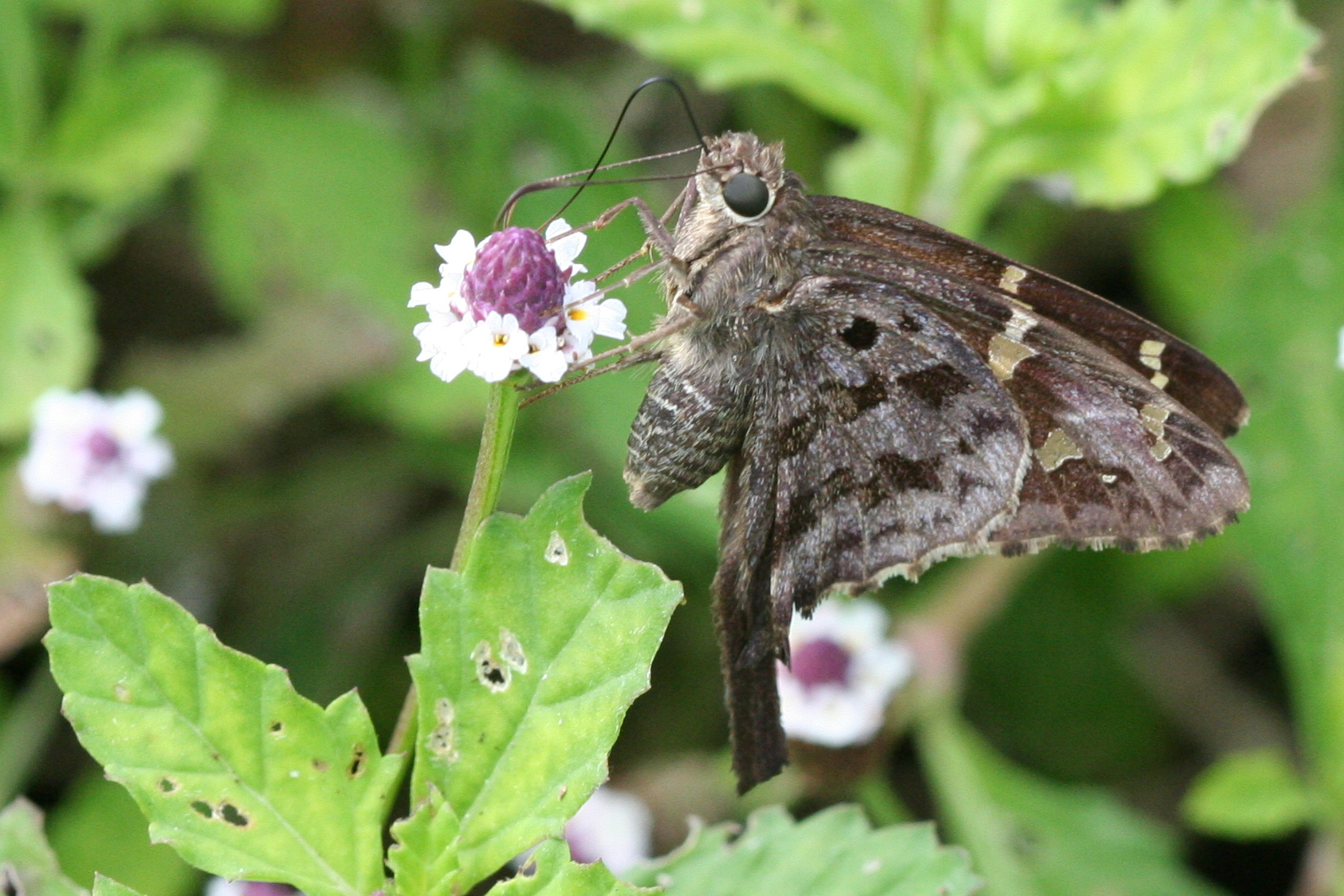

The wingspan is 37–51 mm. There are three to four generations throughout the year in southern Florida and southern Texas.

The larvae feed on various legumes, including wild and cultivated Phaseolus species, Desmodium and blue peas Clitoria. Adults feed on flower nectar from various plants, including shepherd's needle, lantana, trilisa, ironweed, and bougainvillea.

== Subspecies ==
The following subspecies are recognised:

- Cecropterus dorantes dorantes (Texas, Mexico, Surinam, Brazil, Colombia, Venezuela)
- Cecropterus dorantes santiago (Brazil, Jamaica, Haiti, Venezuela, Cuba, Grenada)
- Cecropterus dorantes obscurus (Guadeloupe, Dominica, Martinique, Saba, Antigua, Grenada, Barbados)
- Cecropterus dorantes galapagensis (Galapagos)
- Cecropterus dorantes calafia (Mexico (Baja California))
- Cecropterus dorantes cramptoni (Antilles, Puerto Rico)
