= Thorybes diversus =

Conservation status
- Vulnerable (NatureServe)

Scientific classification
- Kingdom: Animalia
- Phylum: Arthropoda
- Clade: Pancrustacea
- Class: Insecta
- Order: Lepidoptera
- Family: Hesperiidae
- Genus: Thorybes
- Species: T. diversus

Binomial name
- Thorybes diversus Bell, 1927

Species of butterfly

Thorybes diversus, the western cloudywing, is a butterfly of the Hesperiidae (skipper) family. It is found in the western North America. The range extends along western slopes of the Sierra Nevada and Cascade ranges, from southern Oregon to Mariposa County. The habitat consists of small openings in coniferous forests.

== Morphology ==
The adults are primarily a dull brown. The upper aspects of the wings have small pale spots, while the undersides show gray scaling at the margins. The males lack the fold on the forewings leading edge, known as a costal fold, which in other species of butterflies contains scent scales (androconia). Hindwings may show darker banding. The wingspan is 32–38 mm. The wings are dull brown with small pale spots. Adults are on wing from June to July in one generation per year.

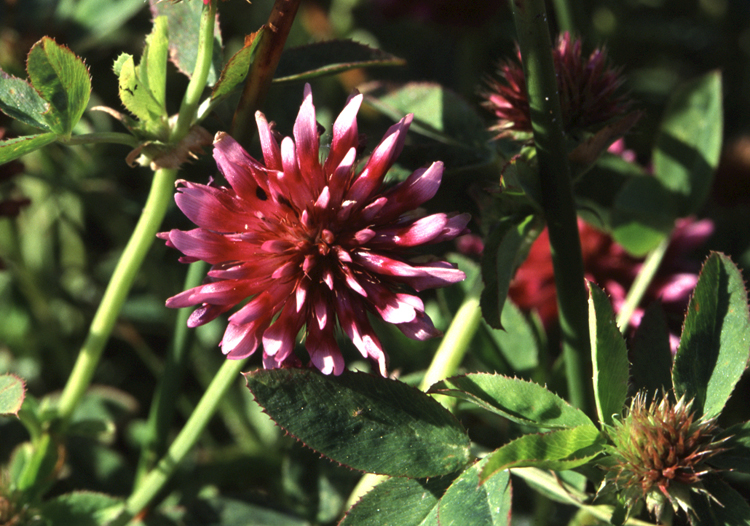
Trifolium wormskioldii

The larvae (caterpillars) feed on Trifolium wormskioldii, a species of clover native to the western half of North America.
