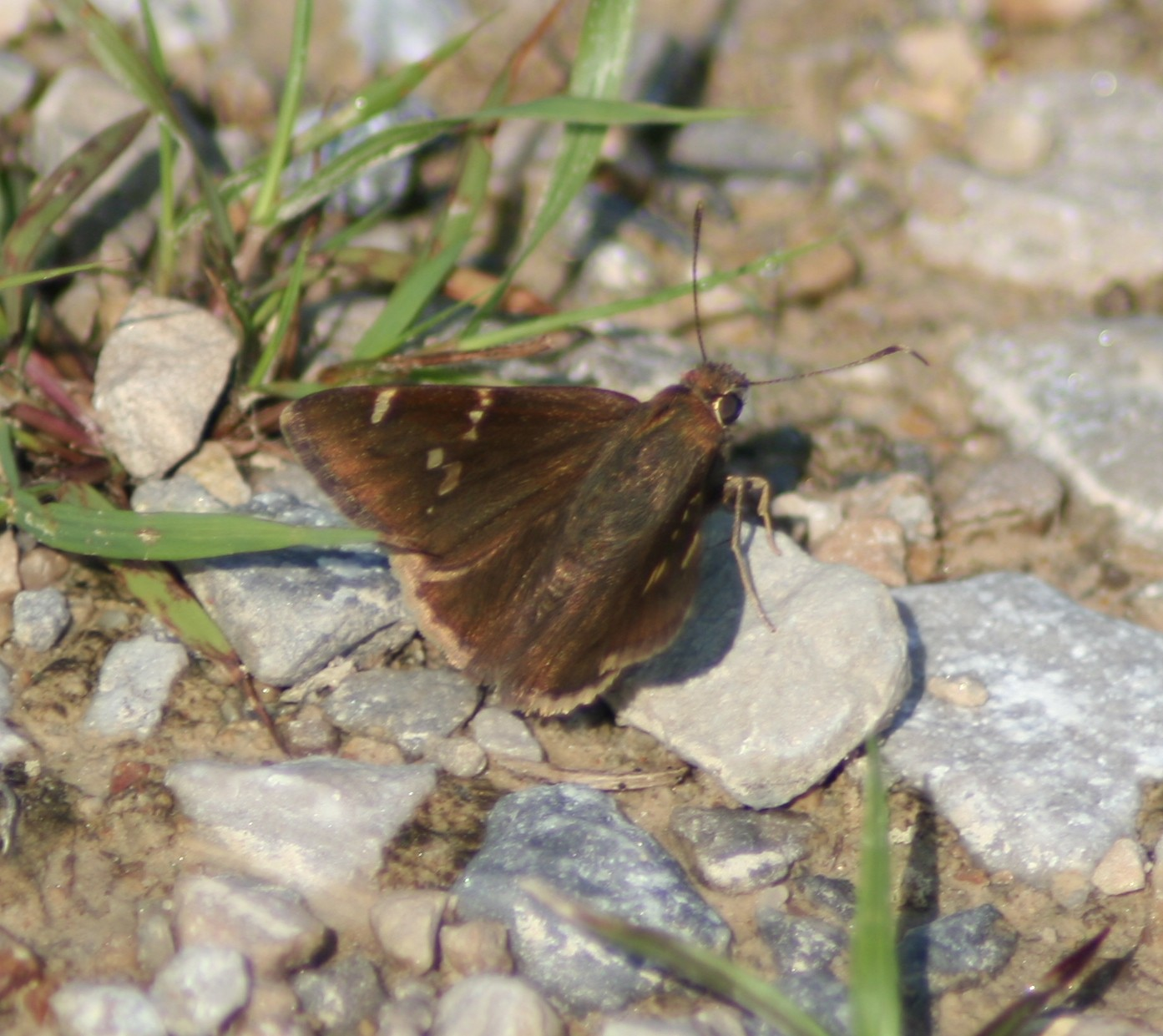

Conservation status
- Secure (NatureServe)

Scientific classification
- Kingdom: Animalia
- Phylum: Arthropoda
- Class: Insecta
- Order: Lepidoptera
- Family: Hesperiidae
- Genus: Thorybes
- Species: T. bathyllus

Binomial name
- Thorybes bathyllus (Smith, 1797)
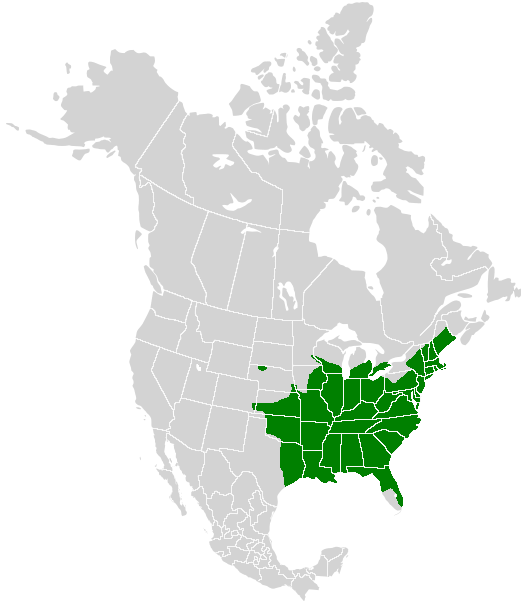

Synonyms
- Cecropterus bathyllus

= Thorybes bathyllus =

Southern cloudywing

Species of butterfly

Thorybes bathyllus, the southern cloudywing (sometimes spelled southern cloudy wing), is a North American butterfly in the family Hesperiidae. Southern cloudywings can be difficult to identify because of individual variation and confusing seasonal forms. In the south, where it has two broods per year, two seasonal forms occur. Spring forms are usually lightly marked and resemble confused cloudywings (Thorybes confusis). Summer forms tend to be more boldly marked, by comparison, making identification easier. However, summer confused cloudywings are also strongly patterned, which makes identifying them more difficult. Their rapid flight is very erratic, though it is closer to the ground than in some of its close relatives.

== Description ==
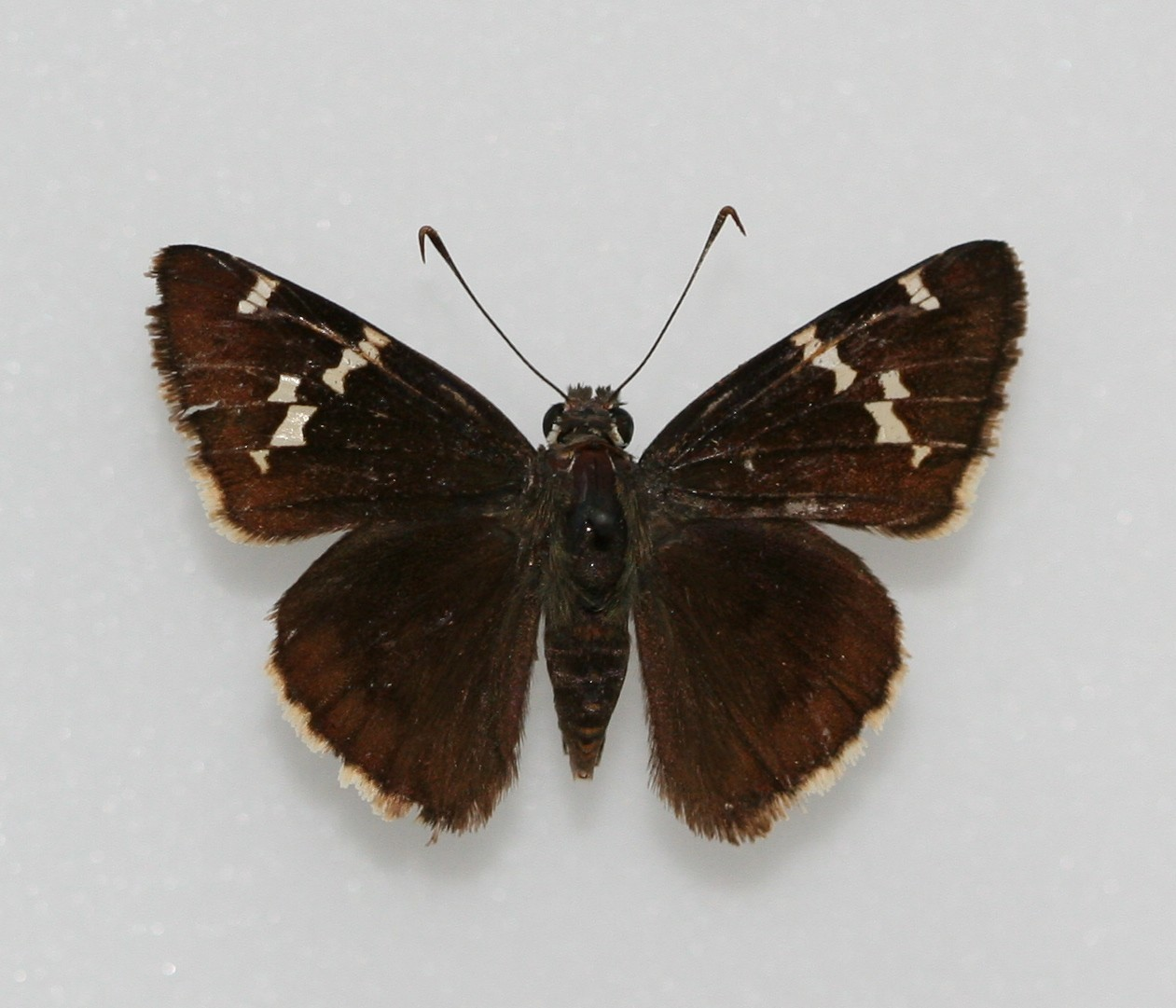
Specimen

On average, the southern cloudywing is usually slightly smaller than the northern cloudywing (Thorybes pylades) and about the same size as the confused cloudywing. The palps are whitish with a white ring around the eye. A white spot is seen on the bend of the antennal club. Males lack a fore wing costal fold. The upper side of the wings is dark brown with the fore wing submarginal area having an aligned row of glassy white spots. Near the fore wing costa is a conspicuous spot in the shape of an hourglass (in spring forms this spot is lacking). In the subapical area are three to four spots that are either all connected as if they were one mark (summer form) or with the bottom spot slightly offset (spring form). The underside of the wings is mottled dark brown with two darker brown bands. In some cases, the hind wing may have a variable amount of frosting near the margin. Its wingspan measures 32–38 mm (1.3–1.5 in).

== Similar species ==
Similar species in the southern cloudywings range include the northern cloudywing and the confused cloudywing.

The northern cloudywing has brown palps, the white ring around the eye is not continuous, and males have a fore wing costal fold.

The confused cloudywing has grayish-white palps, lacks the white spot on the bend of the antennal club, and on the upper side of the fore wing the subapical spots are more loosely connected with the bottom spot quite offset.

== Habitat ==
This butterfly may be found in a variety of open habitats such as along streams, meadows, savannas, scrubby fields, and woodlands.

== Flight ==
This species is on the wing from June to mid-July in the north and March to November in the south.

== Lifecycle ==
Males are highly territorial and are known to use the same perch throughout their adult lifespans. Females lay their pale green eggs singly on the underside of host plant leaves. The larva lives in a leaf shelter by rolling or tying leaves together with silk. The larva is brown with a greenish hue. It has a dark mid-dorsal stripe and has a pale lateral line. The head and collar are both black. The pupa is either greenish with brown markings or a dull brown color. It overwinters as a mature larva. The southern cloudywing has one brood per year in the north and two or three broods in the south.

== Host plants ==
The list of host plants used by the southern cloudywing includes:

- Potato bean, Apios americana
- Ozark milkvetch, Astragalus distortus var. engelmannii
- Butterfly pea, Bradburya virginiana
- Spurred butterfly pea, Centrosema virginianum
- Hairy small-leaved tick-trefoil, Desmodium ciliare
- Panicled tick-trefoil, Desmodium paniculatum
- Round-leaved tick-trefoil, Desmodium rotundifolium
- Roundhead lespedeza, Lespedeza capitata
- Hairy lespedeza, Lespedeza hirta
- Slender lespedeza, Lespedeza virginica
- Twining snoutbean, Rhynchosia tomentosa
- Amberique-bean, Strophostyles helvola
- Slick-seed bean, Strophostyles leiosperma
- Florida hoarypea, Tephrosia florida
