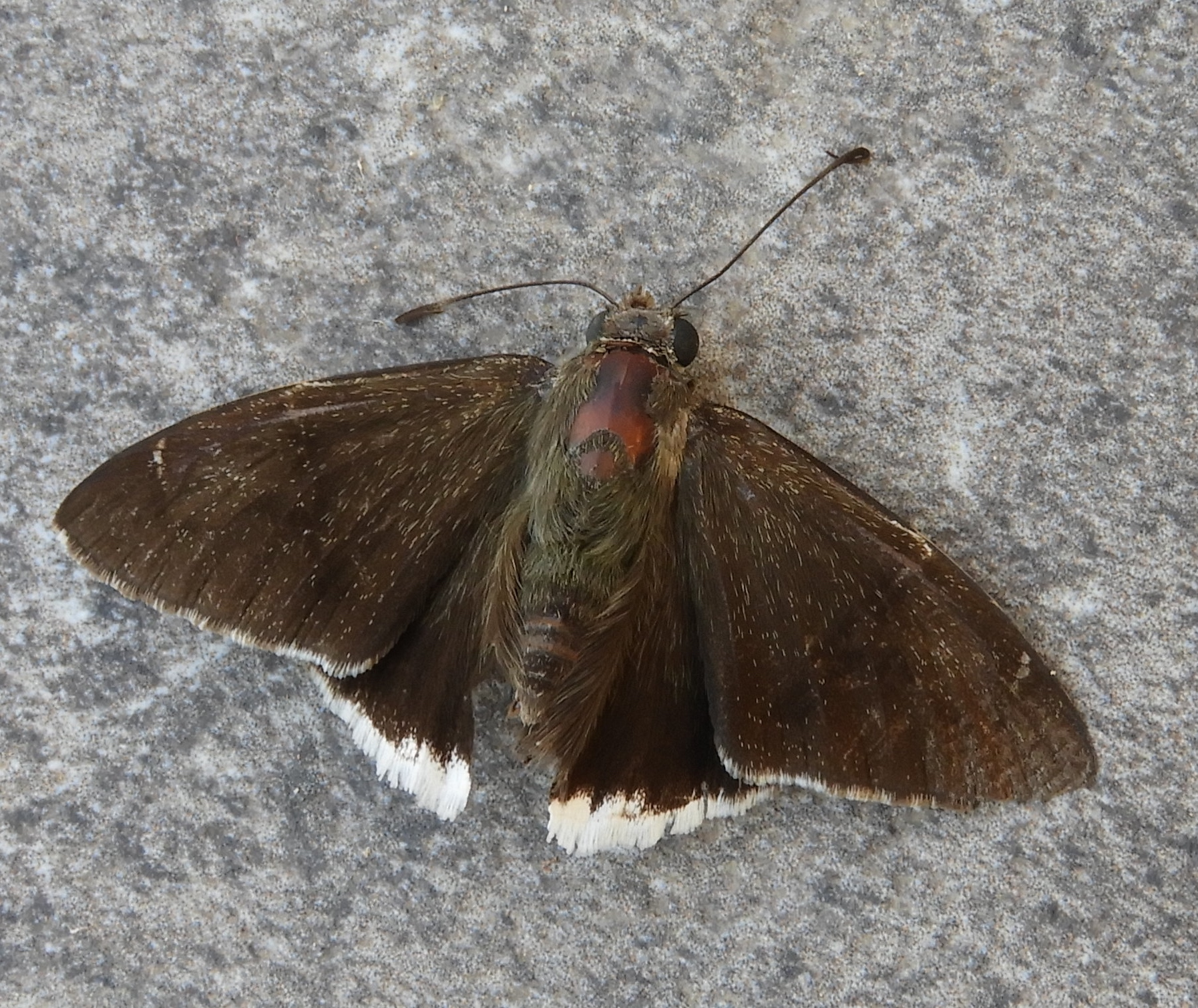
- C. d. chales

Scientific classification
- Kingdom: Animalia
- Phylum: Arthropoda
- Class: Insecta
- Order: Lepidoptera
- Family: Hesperiidae
- Genus: Cecropterus
- Species: C. doryssus

Binomial name
- Cecropterus doryssus (Swainson, 1831)

Synonyms
- Urbanus doryssus (Swainson, 1831)

= Cecropterus doryssus =

Species of butterfly

Cecropterus doryssus, commonly known as the white-tailed longtail, is a species of dicot skipper in the butterfly family Hesperiidae. It is found in Central America, North America, and South America.

== Subspecies ==
The following subspecies are recognised:

- Cecropterus doryssus albicuspis Herrich-Schäffer, 1869
- Cecropterus doryssus chales (Godman & Salvin, 1893)
- Cecropterus doryssus doryssus (Swainson, 1831)
