= Pachyschelus purpureus =

Scientific classification
- Domain: Eukaryota
- Kingdom: Animalia
- Phylum: Arthropoda
- Class: Insecta
- Order: Coleoptera
- Suborder: Polyphaga
- Infraorder: Elateriformia
- Family: Buprestidae
- Genus: Pachyschelus
- Species: P. purpureus

Binomial name
- Pachyschelus purpureus (Say, 1833)

Species of beetle

Pachyschelus purpureus is a species of metallic wood-boring beetle in the family Buprestidae. It is found in North America.

== Subspecies ==
These four subspecies belong to the species Pachyschelus purpureus:

- Pachyschelus purpureus azureus Waterhouse, 1889
- Pachyschelus purpureus bicolor Kerremans, 1894
- Pachyschelus purpureus purpureus (Say, 1833)
- Pachyschelus purpureus uvaldei Knull, 1941
