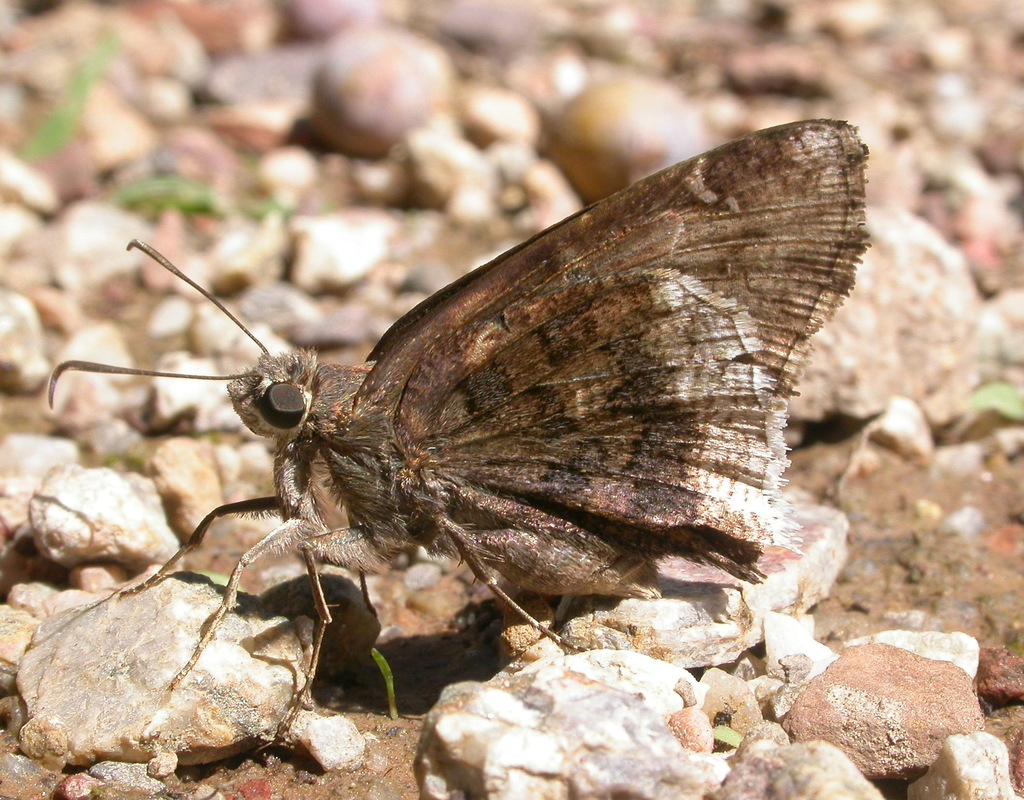

Scientific classification
- Kingdom: Animalia
- Phylum: Arthropoda
- Class: Insecta
- Order: Lepidoptera
- Family: Hesperiidae
- Genus: Cecropterus
- Species: C. casica

Binomial name
- Cecropterus casica (Herrich-Schäffer, 1869)

Synonyms
- Eudamus epigena Butler, 1870; Achalarus casica (Herrich-Schäffer, 1869)

= Cecropterus casica =

Species of butterfly

Cecropterus casica, the desert cloudywing, is a species of dicot skipper in the butterfly family Hesperiidae. It is found in Central America and North America.
