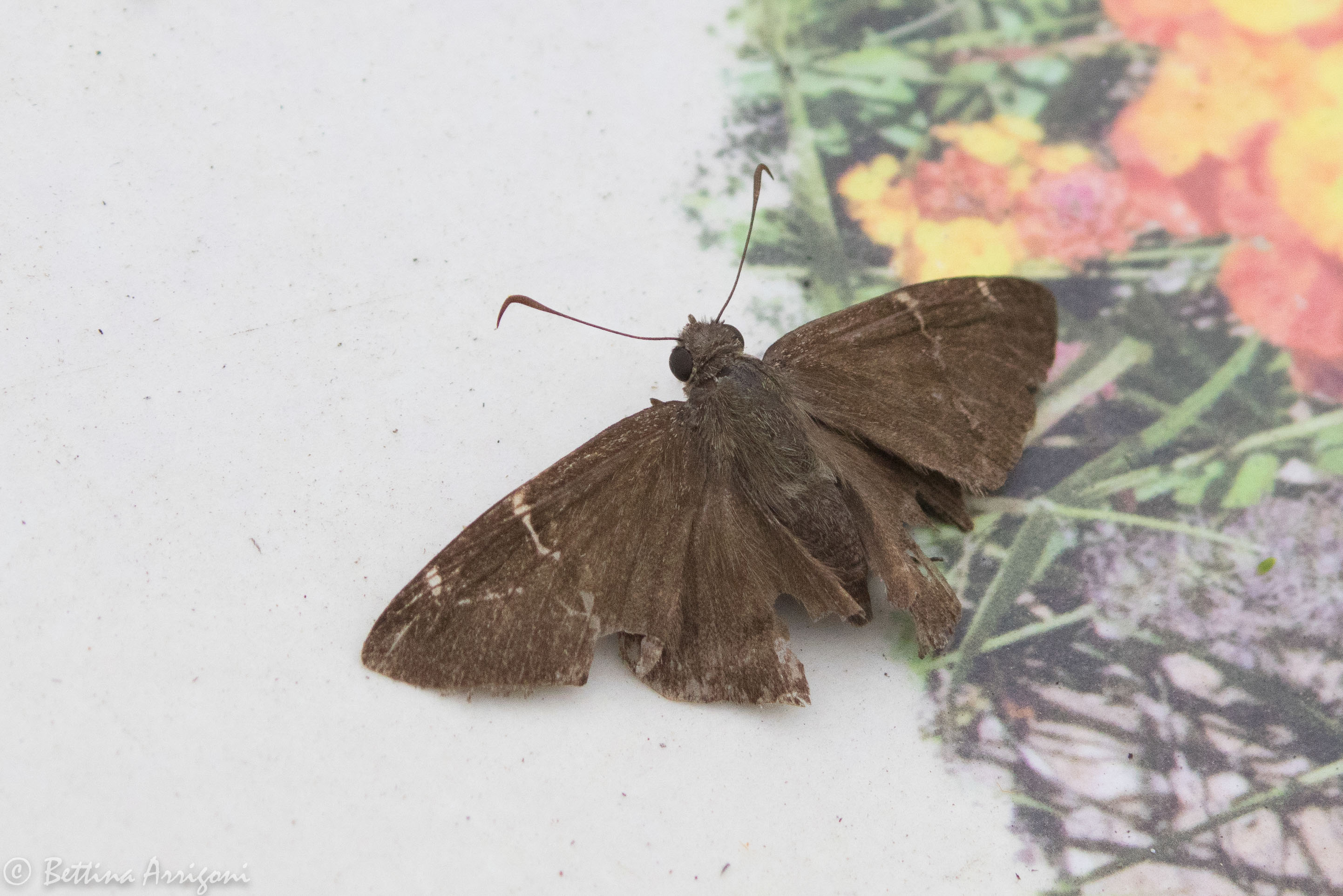

Conservation status
- Apparently Secure (NatureServe)

Scientific classification
- Domain: Eukaryota
- Kingdom: Animalia
- Phylum: Arthropoda
- Class: Insecta
- Order: Lepidoptera
- Family: Hesperiidae
- Genus: Thorybes
- Species: T. confusis

Binomial name
- Thorybes confusis (E. Bell, 1923)

Synonyms
- Cecropterus confusis E. Bell, 1923

= Thorybes confusis =

Species of butterfly

Thorybes confusis, the confused cloudywing, is a butterfly in the family Hesperiidae.

== Appearance, behavior, and distribution ==
The confused cloudywing is often difficult to distinguish from southern and northern cloudywings, which it can often be found with. It lives in open sites near woodlands.
