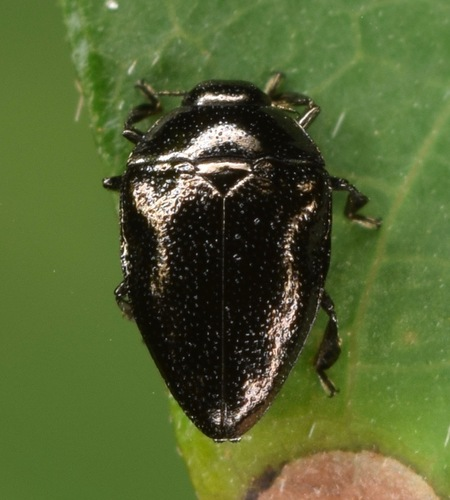

Scientific classification
- Domain: Eukaryota
- Kingdom: Animalia
- Phylum: Arthropoda
- Class: Insecta
- Order: Coleoptera
- Suborder: Polyphaga
- Infraorder: Elateriformia
- Family: Buprestidae
- Genus: Pachyschelus
- Species: P. laevigatus

Binomial name
- Pachyschelus laevigatus (Say, 1833)

Synonyms
- Pachyschelus oblongus (Motschulsky, 1860); Pachyschelus politus Kerremans, 1896; Pachyschelus punctata (Gory, 1841)

= Pachyschelus laevigatus =

Species of beetle

Pachyschelus laevigatus is a species of metallic wood-boring beetle in the family Buprestidae. It is found in North America.
