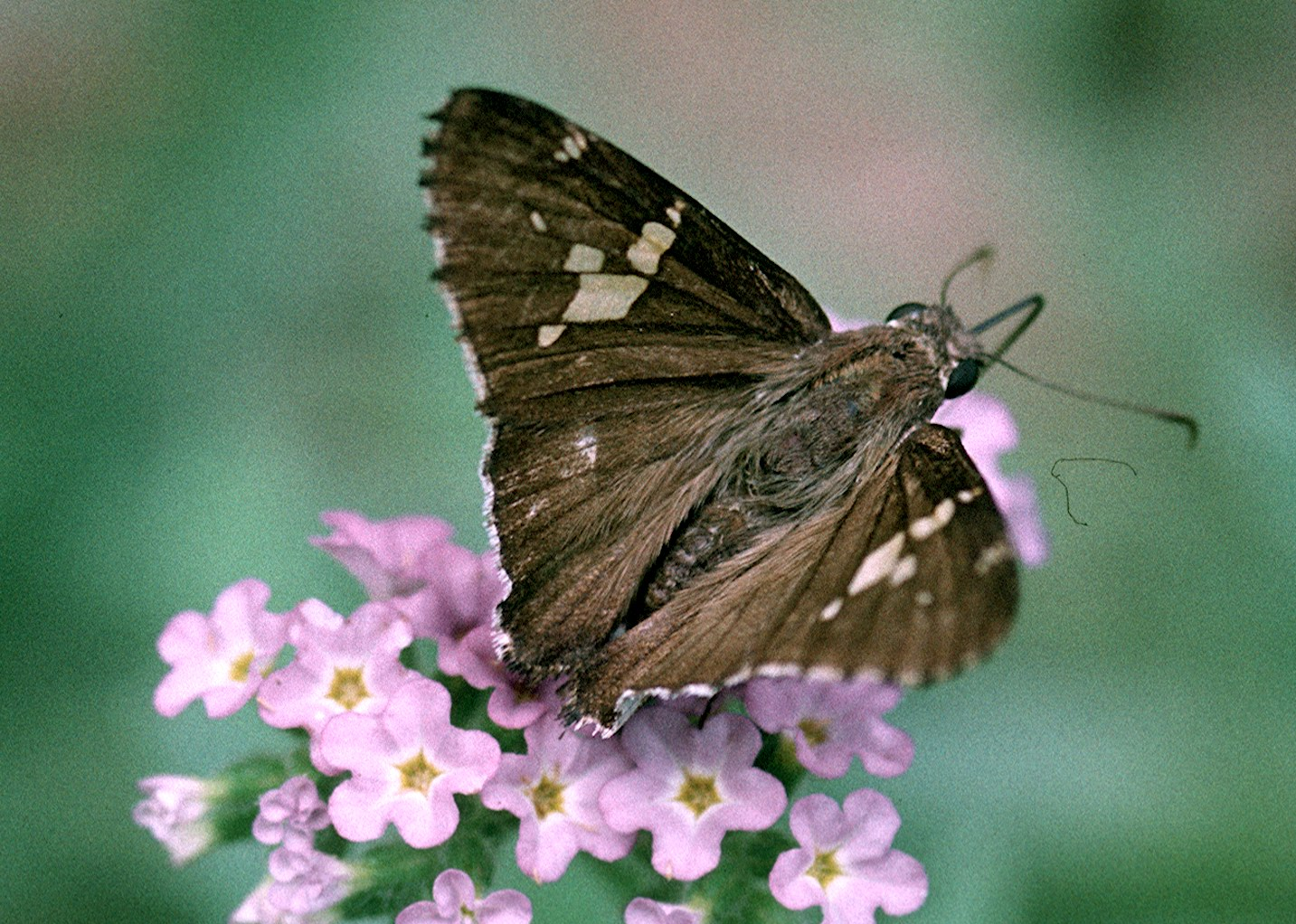

Conservation status
- Secure (NatureServe)

Scientific classification
- Kingdom: Animalia
- Phylum: Arthropoda
- Class: Insecta
- Order: Lepidoptera
- Family: Hesperiidae
- Genus: Cecropterus
- Species: C. lyciades

Binomial name
- Cecropterus lyciades (Geyer, 1832)
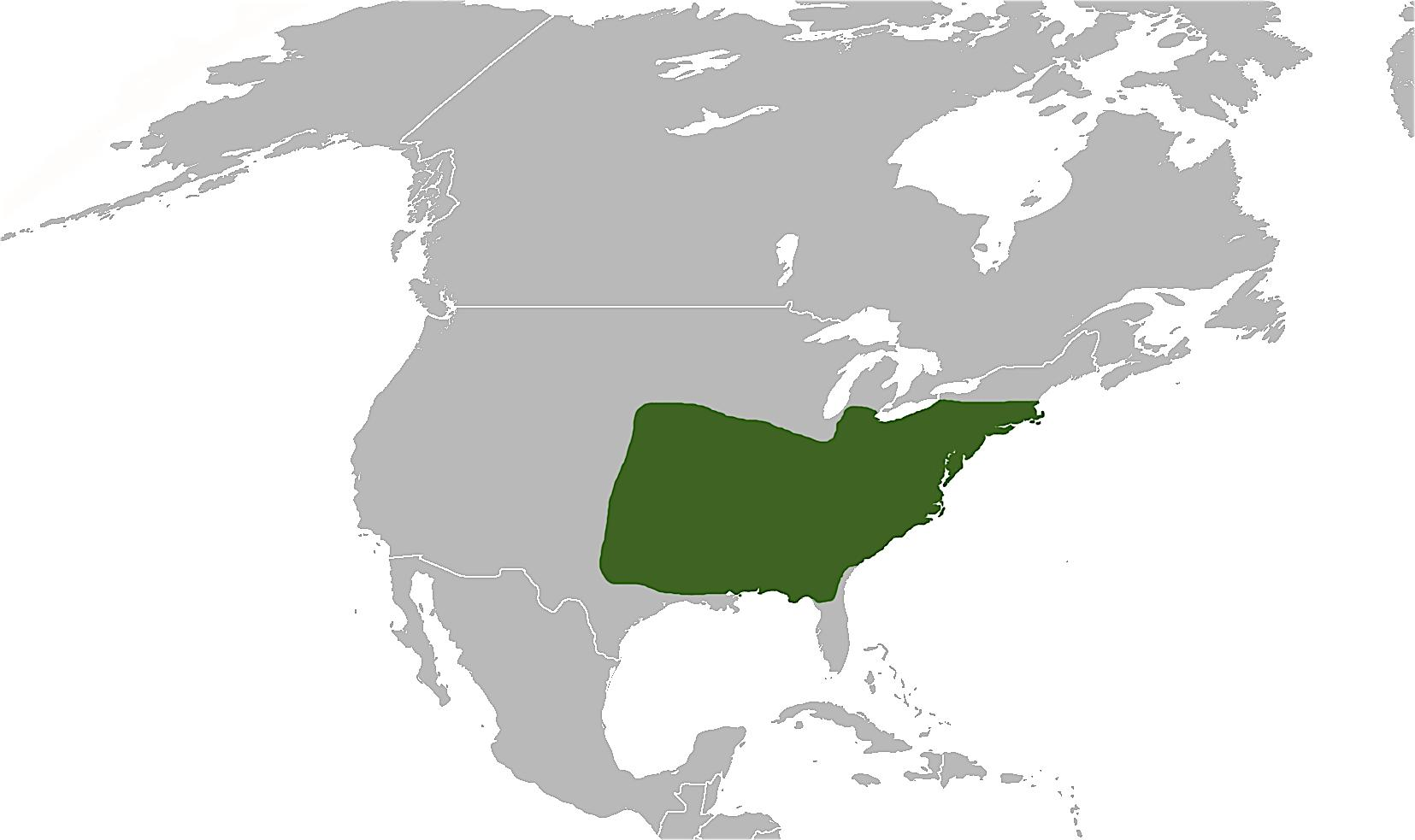

Synonyms
- Achalarus lyciades (Geyer, 1832); Proteides lyciades Geyer, 1832; Thorybes lyciades (Geyer, 1832)

= Cecropterus lyciades =

Hoary edge

Species of butterfly

Cecropterus lyciades, the hoary edge, is a species of skipper in the family Hesperiidae which can be seen throughout the eastern United States in open woodlands, deciduous mixed forest and sandy areas. Cecropterus lyacides is an uncommon butterfly that is named after an underlying whitish patch on the hindwing patch.

== Description ==
The wingspan of the hoary edge is 4.5 to 4.9 cm. This butterfly is very similar in appearance to Epargyreus clarus but is smaller and has a longer strip of diffused silver on its wing.

== Life cycle ==
There are two broods each year in April and September.

=== Larval foods ===
- Tickseed
- Fabaceae
- Legumes
