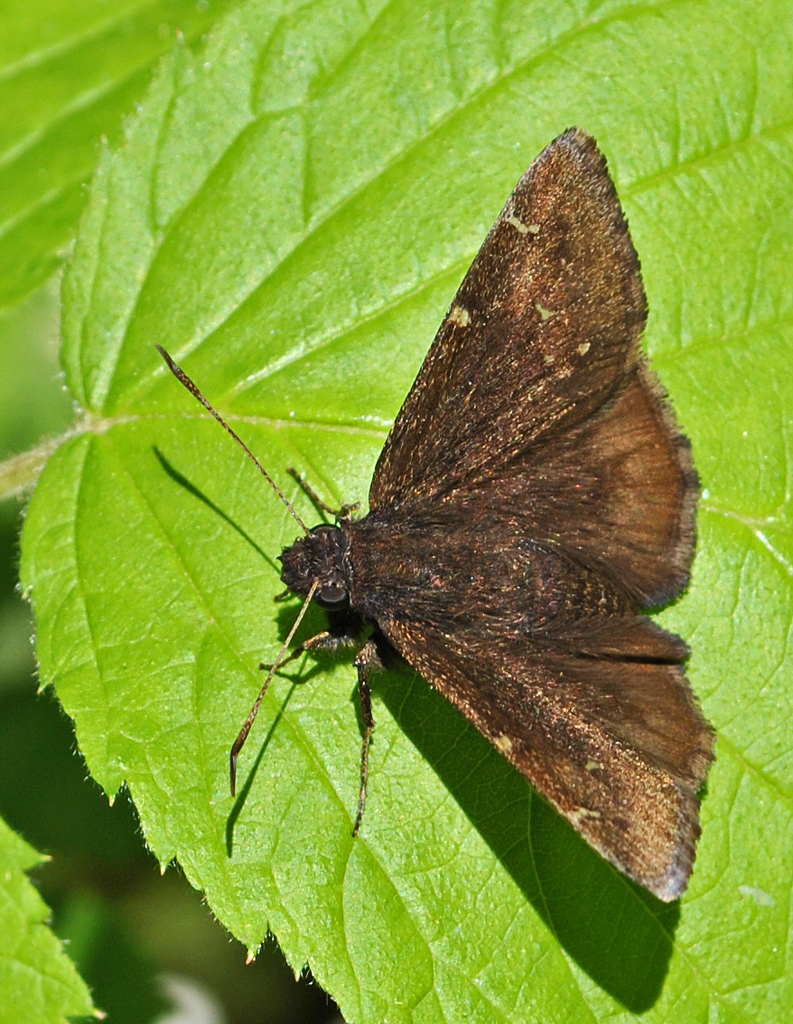

Conservation status
- Secure (NatureServe)

Scientific classification
- Domain: Eukaryota
- Kingdom: Animalia
- Phylum: Arthropoda
- Class: Insecta
- Order: Lepidoptera
- Family: Hesperiidae
- Genus: Cecropterus
- Species: C. pylades

Binomial name
- Cecropterus pylades Scudder (1870)

Synonyms
- Thorybes pylades

= Thorybes pylades =

Northern cloudywing

Species of butterfly

Cecropterus pylades, the northern cloudywing, is a butterfly species of the family Hesperiidae.

== Description ==
The wingspan of C. pylades is between 32 and 47 mm. Both males and females have completely dark brown wings except for the small triangular clear spots.

== Distribution ==
The northern cloudywing is seen from Nova Scotia west across Canada, south into California and across the rest of the United States. Its habitat consist of open boreal woodlands, forest edges, and open fields.

== Life cycle ==
Adults lay eggs singly under the leaves of their host plants. The caterpillars then will eat till they are ready to pupate at which point they will roll themselves into the host plants' leaves. They fly between May and July where there is only one brood, but in the south they fly from March and September where there are two broods.

=== Larval food ===
- Fabaceae
- Desmodium
- Lespedeza
- Trifolium
- Hosackia

=== Nectaring flowers ===
- Apocynum
- Prunella
- Securigera varia
- Lonicera japonica
- Thistle
- Asclepias syriaca
- Dianthus armeria
- Verbena
