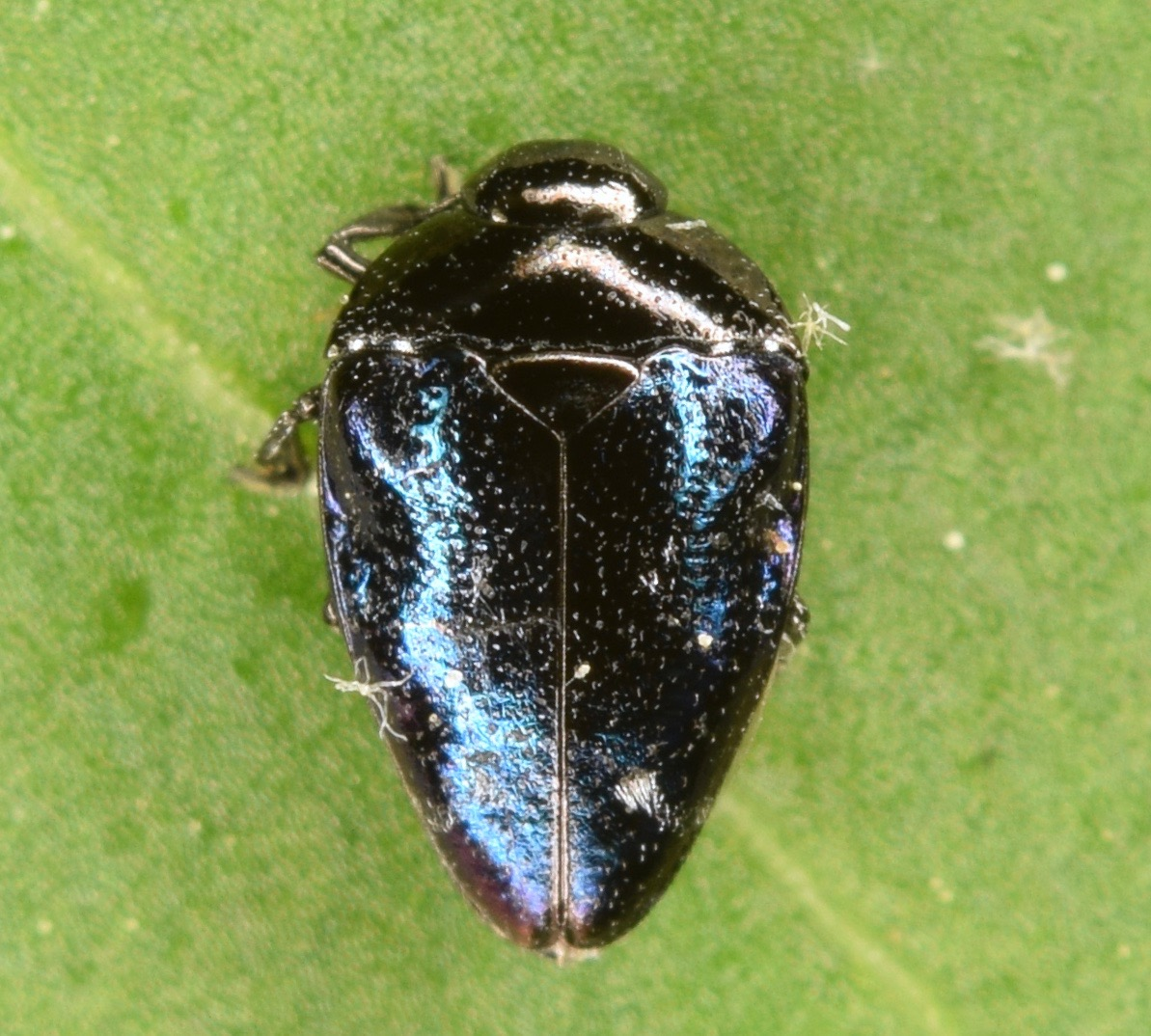

Scientific classification
- Kingdom: Animalia
- Phylum: Arthropoda
- Class: Insecta
- Order: Coleoptera
- Suborder: Polyphaga
- Infraorder: Elateriformia
- Family: Buprestidae
- Subfamily: Agrilinae
- Genus: Pachyschelus; Solier, 1833

Synonyms
- Metonius Say, 1836

= Pachyschelus =

Genus of beetles

Pachyschelus is a genus of metallic wood-boring beetles in the family Buprestidae. There are at least 270 described species in Pachyschelus.

== See also ==
- List of Pachyschelus species
