= Passiflora pentaschista =

Scientific classification
- Kingdom: Plantae
- Clade: Tracheophytes
- Clade: Angiosperms
- Clade: Eudicots
- Clade: Rosids
- Order: Malpighiales
- Family: Passifloraceae
- Genus: Passiflora
- Species: P. pentaschista

Binomial name
- Passiflora pentaschista (Killip) H.T.Svoboda, 2018

Synonyms
- Passiflora arida var. pentaschista Killip

Species of flowering plant

Passiflora pentaschista, commonly known as the desert passionfruit, is a species of plant in the family Passifloraceae. It is a shrub and vine native to northwest Mexico.

== Description ==
Passiflora pentaschista may grow up to 20 in (50 cm) tall. It has blue and white flowers that open in the evenings and its leaves smell unpleasant.

The fruit can be identified as ripe when it turns yellow and falls off of the vine. All parts of Passiflora pentaschista other than the ripe fruit are poisonous.

== Distribution and habitat ==
Passiflora pentaschista grows primarily in deserts or dry shrublands. However, it is drought tolerant and may be able to invade other habitats. It has been introduced to Arizona and California.

== Ecology ==
Passiflora pentaschista may become an invasive species outside of its native habitat. It is a host for Gulf fritillary, Mexican fritillary, and variegated fritillary butterflies.
