= Acraea brainei =

Scientific classification
- Kingdom: Animalia
- Phylum: Arthropoda
- Class: Insecta
- Order: Lepidoptera
- Family: Nymphalidae
- Genus: Acraea
- Species: A. brainei

Binomial name
- Acraea brainei Henning, 1986

Synonyms
- Acraea (Acraea) brainei

Species of butterfly

Acraea brainei, the Braine's acraea, is a butterfly belonging to the Nymphalidae family. It is found in north-western Namibia.

== Biology ==
The habitat consists of granite outcrops on hills and ridges.

Both sexes feed from the flowers of Turnera oculata. They are on wing from February to April.

The larvae also feed on Turnera oculata.

== Taxonomy ==
It is a member of the Acraea terpsicore species group - but see also Pierre & Bernaud, 2014
