= Turnera hermannioides =

Scientific classification
- Kingdom: Plantae
- Clade: Tracheophytes
- Clade: Angiosperms
- Clade: Eudicots
- Clade: Rosids
- Order: Malpighiales
- Family: Passifloraceae
- Genus: Turnera
- Species: T. hermannioides

Binomial name
- Turnera hermannioides Cambess.

Species of flowering plant

Turnera hermannioides is plant species found in Brazil.
