= Turnera hindsiana =

Conservation status
- Endangered (IUCN 3.1)

Scientific classification
- Kingdom: Plantae
- Clade: Tracheophytes
- Clade: Angiosperms
- Clade: Eudicots
- Clade: Rosids
- Order: Malpighiales
- Family: Passifloraceae
- Genus: Turnera
- Species: T. hindsiana

Binomial name
- Turnera hindsiana Benth.

Species of flowering plant

Turnera hindsiana is a species of plant in the family Passifloraceae. It is endemic to Ecuador. Its natural habitat is subtropical or tropical moist lowland forests.
