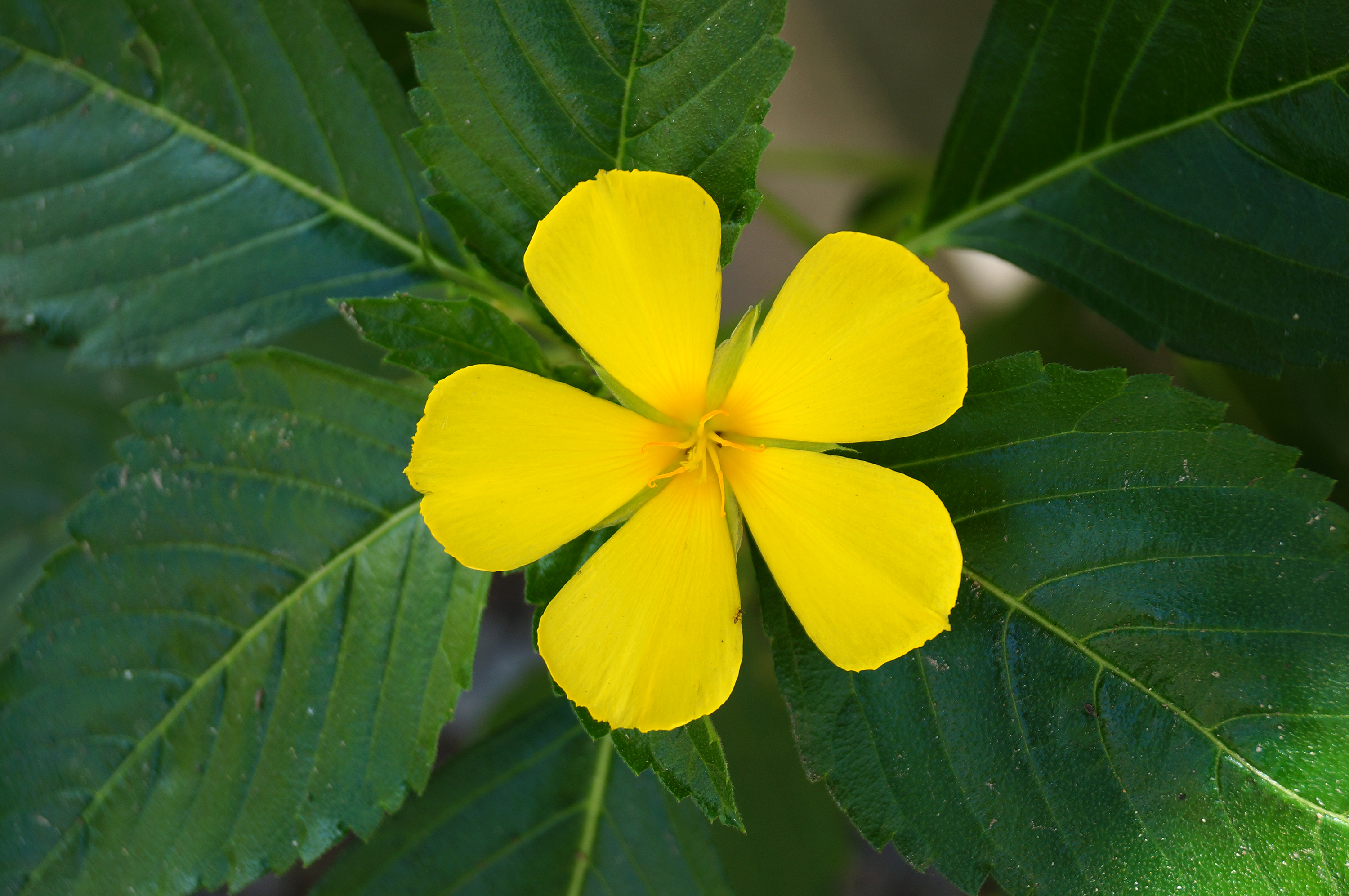
- Turnera ulmifolia

Scientific classification
- Kingdom: Plantae
- Clade: Tracheophytes
- Clade: Angiosperms
- Clade: Eudicots
- Clade: Rosids
- Order: Malpighiales
- Family: Passifloraceae
- Subfamily: Turneroideae
- Genus: Turnera; L.

Type species
- Turnera ulmifolia L. 1753

Species
- See text

= Turnera =

Genus of flowering plants

Turnera is a genus of flowering plants in the passionflower family, Passifloraceae. It contains more than 100 species native to tropical and subtropical America. The name honours English naturalist William Turner (1508–1568). It was previously placed in the family Turneraceae.

== Species ==
The following species are currently recognized:

=== A ===
- Turnera acangatinga Costa-Lima & E.C.O.Chagas
- Turnera acaulis^{1}Griseb.
- Turnera acuta^{2} Willd.
- Turnera amapaensis R.S.Cowan
- Turnera amazonica^{1?}Arbo
- Turnera angelicae Arbo
- Turnera annectens^{2} Arbo
- Turnera arcuata^{2} Urb.
- Turnera arenaria (Spruce ex Urb.) Arbo
- Turnera argentea^{2} Arbo
- Turnera aromatica^{2}Arbo
- Turnera asymmetrica^{2}Arbo
- Turnera aurantiaca^{2} Benth.
- Turnera aurelioi^{1} Arbo

=== B ===
- Turnera bahiensis Urb.
  - var. bahiensis^{2}
  - var. truncata^{2} Arbo.
- Turnera benthamiana^{2} M.R.Schomb.
- Turnera blanchetiana Urb.
  - var. blanchetiana^{2}
  - var. subsppicata Urb.
- Turnera brasiliensis^{2}Willd. ex Schult.
- Turnera breviflora^{2}Moura

=== C ===
- Turnera caatingana^{2} Arbo
- Turnera callosa^{2} Urb.
- Turnera campaniflora^{1} Arbo, Shore & S.C.H.Barrett
- Turnera candida^{1} Arbo
- Turnera castilloi^{2} Arbo
- Turnera cearensis^{2} Urb.
- Turnera chamaedrifolia^{3} Cambess.
- Turnera chrysocephala^{2}Urb.
- Turnera cicatricosa^{2} Arbo
- Turnera cipoensis^{2}Arbo
- Turnera clauseniana^{2} Urb.
- Turnera coccinea^{2} Arbo
- Turnera coerulea^{2} DC.
  - var. coerulea^{2}
  - var. surinamensis^{2} (Urb.) Arbo & Av.Fernández
- Turnera collotricha^{2} Arbo
- Turnera concinna^{2} Arbo
- Turnera confertiflora^{2} Arbo
- Turnera coriacea Urb.
  - var. solium^{2}
- Turnera crulsii^{2} Urb.
- Turnera cuneiformis^{1} Juss. ex Poir.
- Turnera curassavica^{2} Urb.

=== D ===
- Turnera dasytricha Pilg.
  - var. crinita Arbo
  - var. dasytricha
- Turnera diamantinae Arbo
- Turnera dichotoma^{2} Gardner ex Hook.
- Turnera diffusa Willd. ex Schult.
  - var. diffusa^{2}
- Turnera discolor^{2} Urb.
- Turnera discors Arbo
- Turnera dolichostigma^{2}Urb.

=== E ===
- Turnera elliptica^{2} Urb.
- Turnera emendata Arbo

=== F ===
- Turnera fasciculifolia L.Rocha & Arbo
- Turnera fernandezii^{2}Arbo
- Turnera fissifolia Arbo
- Turnera foliosa^{2} Urb.

=== G ===
- Turnera gardneriana^{1?} Arbo
- Turnera genistoides^{2} Cambess.
- Turnera glabrata Arbo
- Turnera glaziovii^{2} Urb.
- Turnera gouveiana Arbo
- Turnera grandidentata^{2} (Urb.) Arbo
- Turnera grandiflora^{2} (Urb.) Arbo
- Turnera guianensis^{2} Aubl.

=== H ===
- Turnera harleyi^{2} Arbo
- Turnera hassleriana^{2} Urb.
- Turnera hermannioides^{2} Cambess.
- Turnera hilaireana^{2} Urb.
- Turnera hindsiana^{2} Benth.
  - subspecies brachyantha^{2} Arbo
  - subspecies hindsiana^{2}
- Turnera huberi^{2} Arbo
- Turnera humilis Arbo

=== I ===
- Turnera ibateguara Costa-Lima & E.C.O.Chagas
- Turnera ignota^{2} Arbo
- Turnera incana^{2} Cambess.
- Turnera involucrata^{2} Arbo
- Turnera iterata^{2} Arbo

=== J ===
- Turnera jobertii Arbo
- Turnera joelii^{2} Arbo

=== K ===
- Turnera krapovickasii^{2} Arbo
- Turnera kuhlmanniana^{2} Arbo

=== L ===
- Turnera laciniata^{2} Arbo
- Turnera lamiifolia^{2} Cambess.
- Turnera lanceolata^{2} Cambess.
- Turnera leptosperma^{2} Urb.
- Turnera lineata^{2?} Urb.
- Turnera longiflora^{2} Cambess.
- Turnera longipes^{2} Triana ex Urb.
- Turnera lucida^{1} Urb.
- Turnera luetzelburgii Sleumer
  - var. dubia^{2} Arbo
  - var. luetzelburgii^{2}

=== M ===
- Turnera macrophylla^{3} Urb.
- Turnera macrosperma L.Rocha & Arbo
- Turnera maigualidensis J.R.Grande & Arbo
- Turnera melanorhiza^{2} Urb.
  - var. arenaria^{2}
  - var. latifolia^{2}
  - var. melochioides^{2}
  - var. rugosa^{2}
- Turnera melochia Triana & Planch.
  - var. melochia
  - var. ramosissima (Spruce ex Urb.) Arbo
- Turnera melochioides Cambess.
  - var. latifolia Urb.
  - var. melochioides ^{2}
  - var. rugosa Arbo

=== N ===
- Turnera nervosa^{2} Urb.

=== O ===
- Turnera oblongifolia^{2} Cambess.
  - var. goyanzensis^{2} (Urb.) Arbo
  - var. oblongifolia^{2}
- Turnera occidentalis^{1} Arbo & Shore
- Turnera oculata Story
  - var. oculata^{1}
  - var. paucipilosa (Oberm.)
- Turnera odorata^{2} Rich.
- Turnera opifera^{2} Mart.
- Turnera orientalis^{1} (Urb.) Arbo

=== P ===
- Turnera panamensis^{2}Urb
- Turnera paradoxa Arbo
- Turnera paruana^{2} Arbo
- Turnera patens Arbo
- Turnera pinifolia^{1} Cambess.
- Turnera pohliana^{2} Urb.
- Turnera prancei^{2} Arbo
- Turnera pumilea L.
  - var. piauhyensis^{2} Urb.
  - var. pumilea^{1}
- Turnera purpurascens^{2} Arbo

=== R ===
- Turnera reginae^{2} Arbo
- Turnera revoluta^{2} Urb.
- Turnera riedeliana^{2} Urb.
- Turnera rosulata^{2} Arbo
- Turnera rupestris Aubl.
  - var. frutescemces (Aubl.) Urb.
  - var. rupestris^{2}

=== S ===
- Turnera sancta^{2} Arbo
- Turnera scabra^{2} Millsp.
- Turnera serrata Vell.
  - var. brevifolia^{2} Urb.
  - var. latifolia Urb.
  - var. serrata ^{2}
- Turnera sidoides L.
  - subsp. carnea^{3} (Cambess.) Arbo
  - subsp. holosericea^{3} (Urb.) Arbo
  - subsp. integrifolia^{2} (Griseb.) Arbo
  - subsp. pinnatifida^{2} (Juss. ex Poir.) Arbo
  - subsp. sidoides^{3}
- Turnera simulans^{2} Arbo
- Turnera stachydifolia Urb. & Rolfe
  - var. flexuosa Urb.
  - var. stachydifolia^{2}
- Turnera stenophylla^{2} Urb.
- Turnera steyermarkii^{2} Arbo
- Turnera stipularis^{2} Urb.
- Turnera subnuda^{2} Urb.
- Turnera subulata^{2} Sm.

=== T ===
- Turnera tapajoensis^{1?}Moura
- Turnera tenuicaulis^{2} Urb.
- Turnera thomasii^{1} (Urb.) Story
- Turnera triglandulosa Millsp.
- Turnera trigona^{2} Urb.

=== U ===
- Turnera uleana^{2} Urb.
- Turnera ulmifolia^{1} L.
  - var. acuta^{1} (Mill.) Willd.
  - var. ulmifolia^{1}
- Turnera urbanii^{1} Arbo

=== V ===
- Turnera vallisii Arbo
- Turnera velutina^{1} C.Presl
- Turnera venezuelana Arbo
- Turnera venosa^{2} Urb.
- Turnera vicaria^{2} Arbo
- Turnera violacea Brandegee

=== W ===
- Turnera weddelliana^{2} Urb. & Rolfe

=== Z ===
- Turnera zeasperma C.D.Adams & V.Bean

==== Notes on the number of floral morphs ====
1,2,3 denote the number of floral morphs (1 = homostylous, 2 = distylous, 3 = distylous with intermediate morph) ? Denotes uncertain annotations. Those unannotated are missing data.

=== Formerly placed in the genus ===
- Piriqueta cistoides (L.) Griseb. (as T. cistoides L. or T. tomentosa Willd.)
- Piriqueta racemosa (Jacq.) Sweet (as T. ovata Bello or T. racemosa Jacq.)
