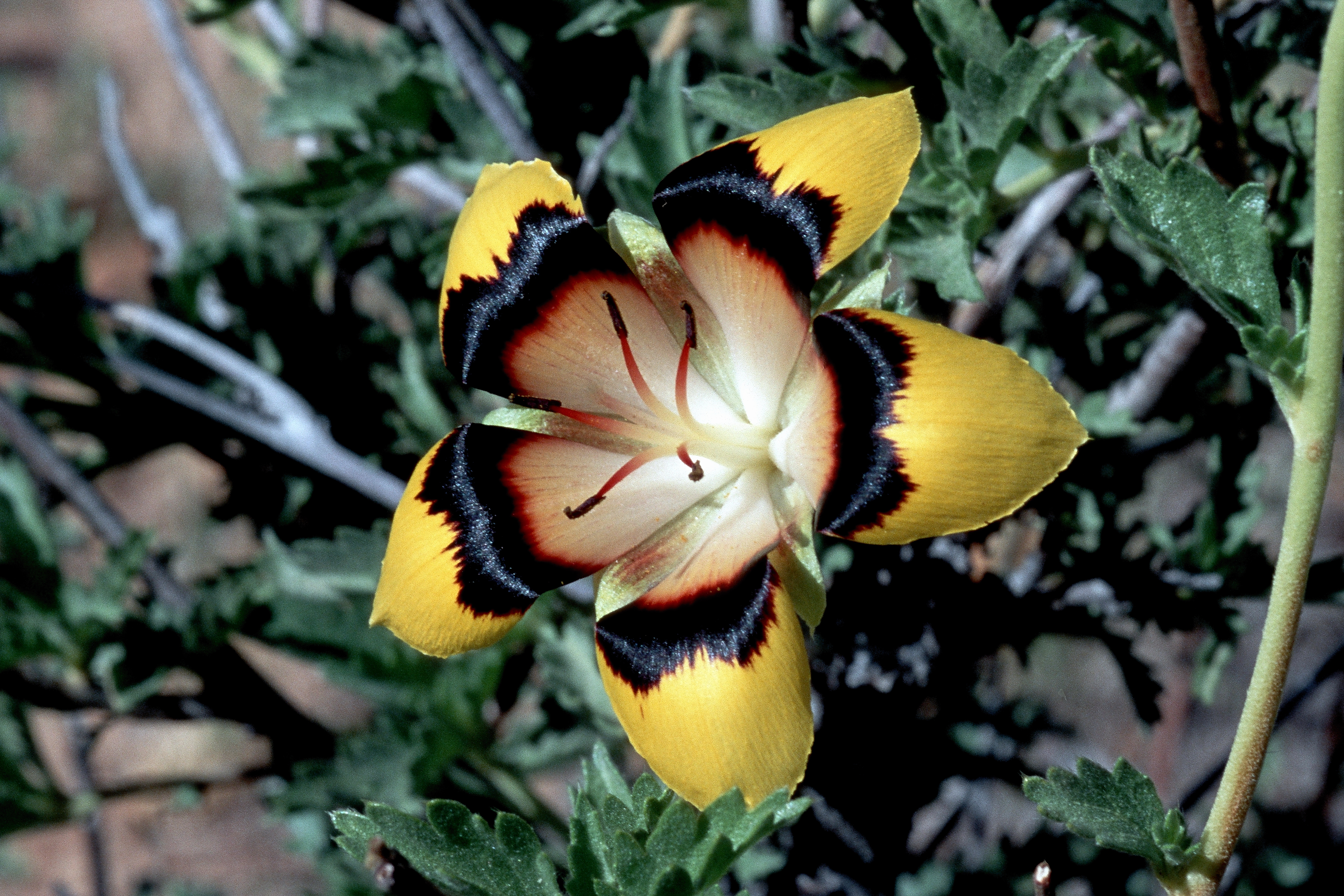

Scientific classification
- Kingdom: Plantae
- Clade: Embryophytes
- Clade: Tracheophytes
- Clade: Spermatophytes
- Clade: Angiosperms
- Clade: Eudicots
- Clade: Rosids
- Order: Malpighiales
- Family: Passifloraceae
- Genus: Turnera
- Species: T. oculata

Binomial name
- Turnera oculata Story

= Turnera oculata =

Species of shrub

Turnera oculata is a species of evergreen, woody shrub, bearing striking yellow flowers with a dark centre, and occurring in the Kaokoveld in the Namib Desert in northern Namibia and in southern Angola. It is one of some 130 species occurring mainly in South America, but with two species found in Africa - one in Namibia and Angola, and the other in tropical Africa.

== Description ==
This species is up to 2.5 m tall with a woody stem some 30 mm thick at the base, and with short side branches. The plant has a dense covering of grey-green velvety hairs which may be stellate or simple. Its leaves are leathery and alternate, obovate, some 50 mm long and 25 mm broad with 5–7 pairs of shallow teeth along the margins. Veins on the lower surface are conspicuous. Mature leaves have two whitish oval glands on opposite sides of the leaf base. These glands have orange-coloured rims, and produce nectar (extrafloral nectary). Flowers are solitary with their pedicels distinctively adnate to the upper side of the leaf petiole bases. Each flower carries two thread-like bracts some 7 mm in length. Calyx is tubular, some 12 mm long with narrowly pointed lobes. Petals are bright yellow with dark brown and black markings towards the base. The 3-chambered fruit is egg-shaped and about 9 mm long. Seeds are curved, cylindrical and 4 mm long.

== Distribution and habitat ==
The species grows well within the tropics and has adapted to very hot, dry, sandy watercourses. Its upright habit and covering of velvety hairs allow it to survive harsh conditions.

== Ecology ==
The glands producing nectar act as incentive for ants to protect the plant and particularly the flowers. In cultivation at the Botanical Society conservatory the invasive Argentinean ants rapidly discovered and regularly feed from the glands. Nectaries are found in related genera such as Adenia. Flowers develop in summer, and open during the daylight hours, attracting various insects including butterflies such as Acraea brainei.

== Etymology ==
The genus Turnera commemorates William Turner, a British physician and botanist, while ‘oculata' translates as 'having eyes'. Turnera oculata was discovered by Robert Story (1913-1999) in 1956, some 20 km south of the Kunene River, and described by him in the botanical magazine ‘Bothalia' in 1961. Story was also noted for his paper "Some Plants Used by the Bushmen in Obtaining Food and Water" published in 1958 as 'Botanical Survey of South Africa Memoir No. 30'.
