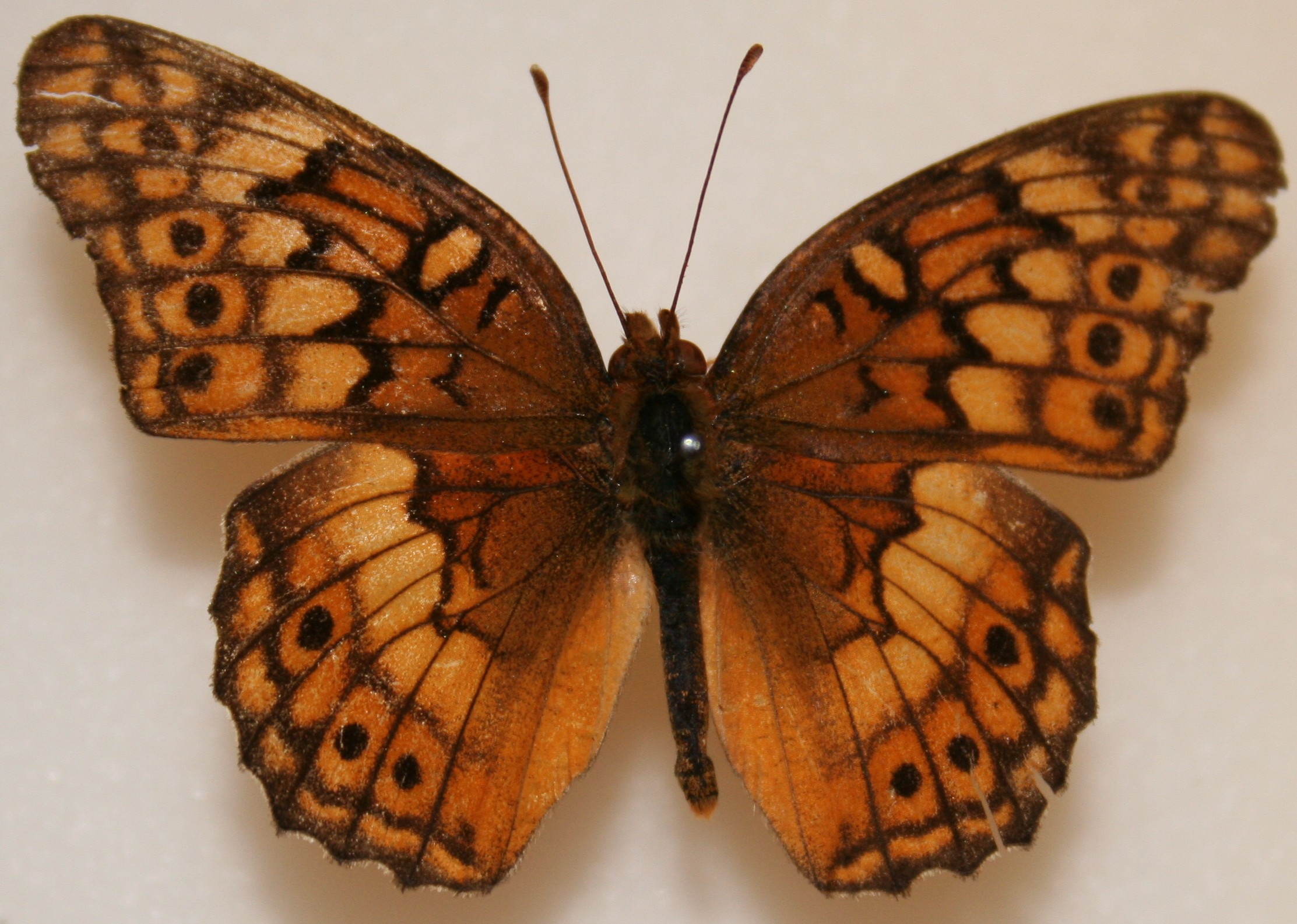

Conservation status
- Secure (NatureServe)

Scientific classification
- Kingdom: Animalia
- Phylum: Arthropoda
- Clade: Pancrustacea
- Class: Insecta
- Order: Lepidoptera
- Family: Nymphalidae
- Genus: Euptoieta
- Species: E. claudia

Binomial name
- Euptoieta claudia (Cramer, 1775)

= Euptoieta claudia =

Variegated fritillary

Species of butterfly

Euptoieta claudia, the variegated fritillary, is a North and South American butterfly in the family Nymphalidae. Though the variegated fritillary has some very different characteristics from the Speyeria fritillaries, it is still closely related to them. Some of the differences include variegated fritillaries have two or three broods per year vs. one per year in Speyeria; they are nomadic vs. sedentary; and they use a wide range of host plants vs. just violets. And because of their use of passionflowers as a host plant, variegated fritillaries also have taxonomic links to the heliconians. Their flight is low and swift, but even when resting or nectaring, this species is extremely difficult to approach, so its genus name was taken from the Greek word euptoietos meaning "easily scared".

== Description ==
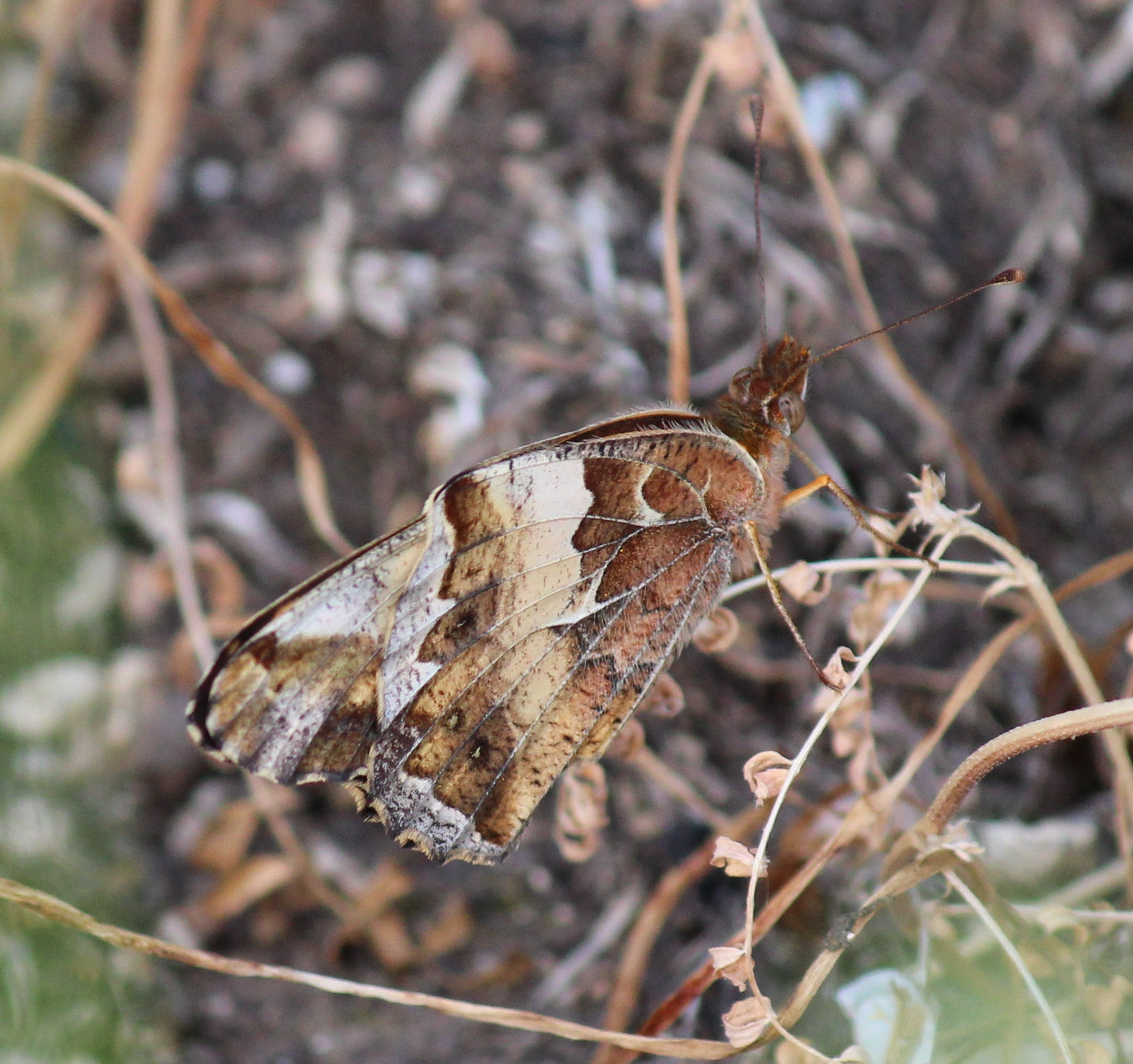
Underside of wings

The upperside of the wings is checkered with orange and black. Both the forewing and hindwing have a row of submarginal black spots and black median lines running across the wings. The underside of the forewing is orange with a pale orange spot rimmed in black in the forewing cell. The underside of the hindwing is mottled with browns and grays with a pale postmedian band. There is no silvering. The wingspan measures 1.75–2.25 inches (44–57 mm).

== Similar species ==
In the variegated fritillary's range, the only similar species is the Mexican fritillary (Euptoieta hegesia). The Mexican fritillary is brighter orange, the upper side of its hindwing basal area is unmarked, and the underside of its wings is plainer, with no submarginal spots or median black lines.

== Flight period ==
This species may be seen flying from April to October in the south, while in the north, it flies from summer to early fall.

== Habitat ==
This butterfly is often found in open, disturbed habitats such as clover and alfalfa fields, pastures, fields, waste areas, roadsides, and mountain meadows.

== Nectar plants ==
Here is a list of some of the flowers that the variegated fritillary uses as nectar plants:

- Dogbane, Apocynum species
- Common milkweed, Asclepias syriaca
- Asters, Aster sp.
- Bearded beggarticks, Bidens aristosa
- Thistles, Cirsium sp.
- Coneflowers, Echinacea sp.
- Fleabane, Erigeron sp.
- Common boneset, Eupatorium perfoliatum
- Alfalfa, Medicago sativa
- Red clover, Trifolium pratense
- Ironweed, Vernonia sp.
- Sedum, Sedum

== Lifecycle ==
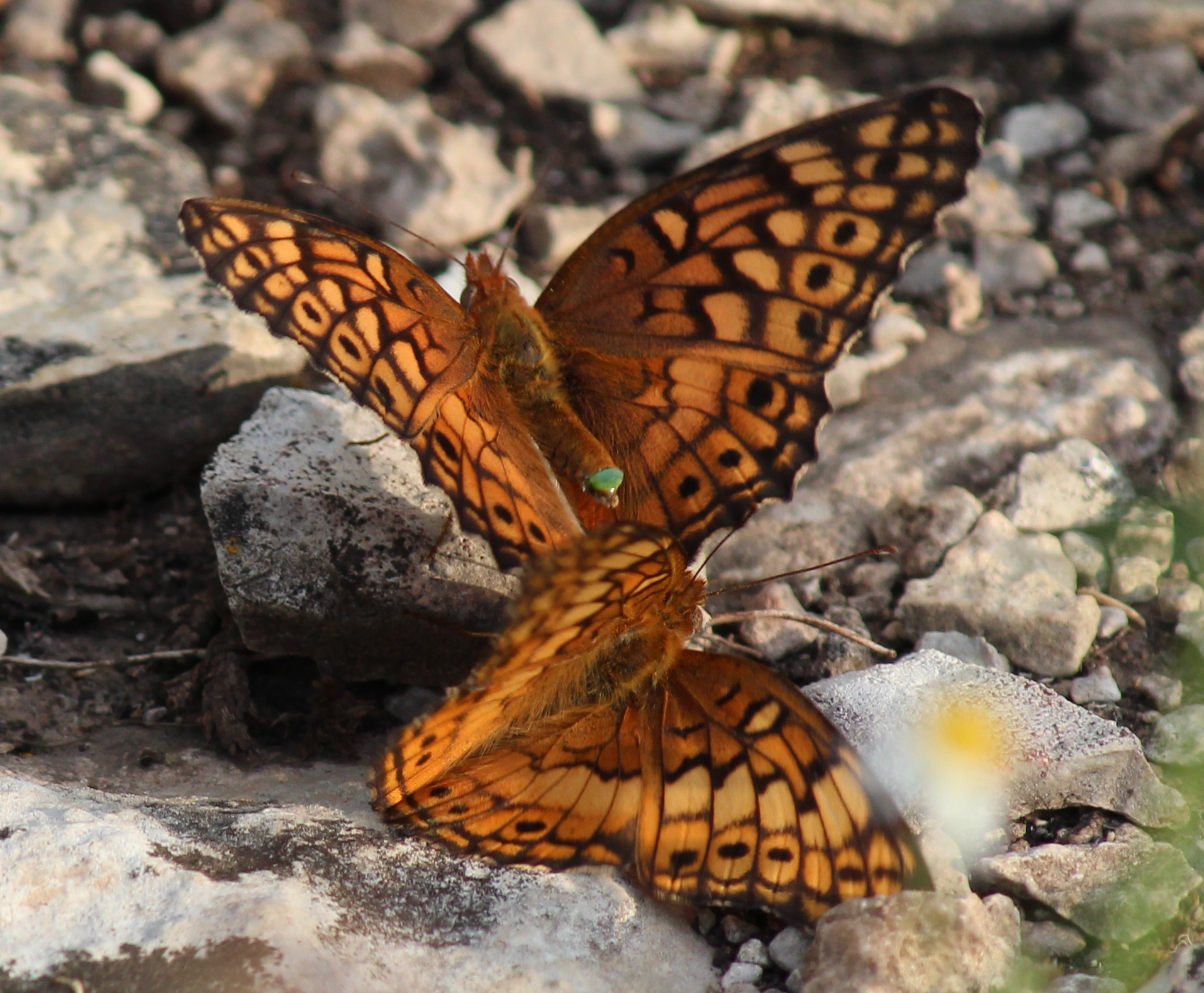
Preparing to mate

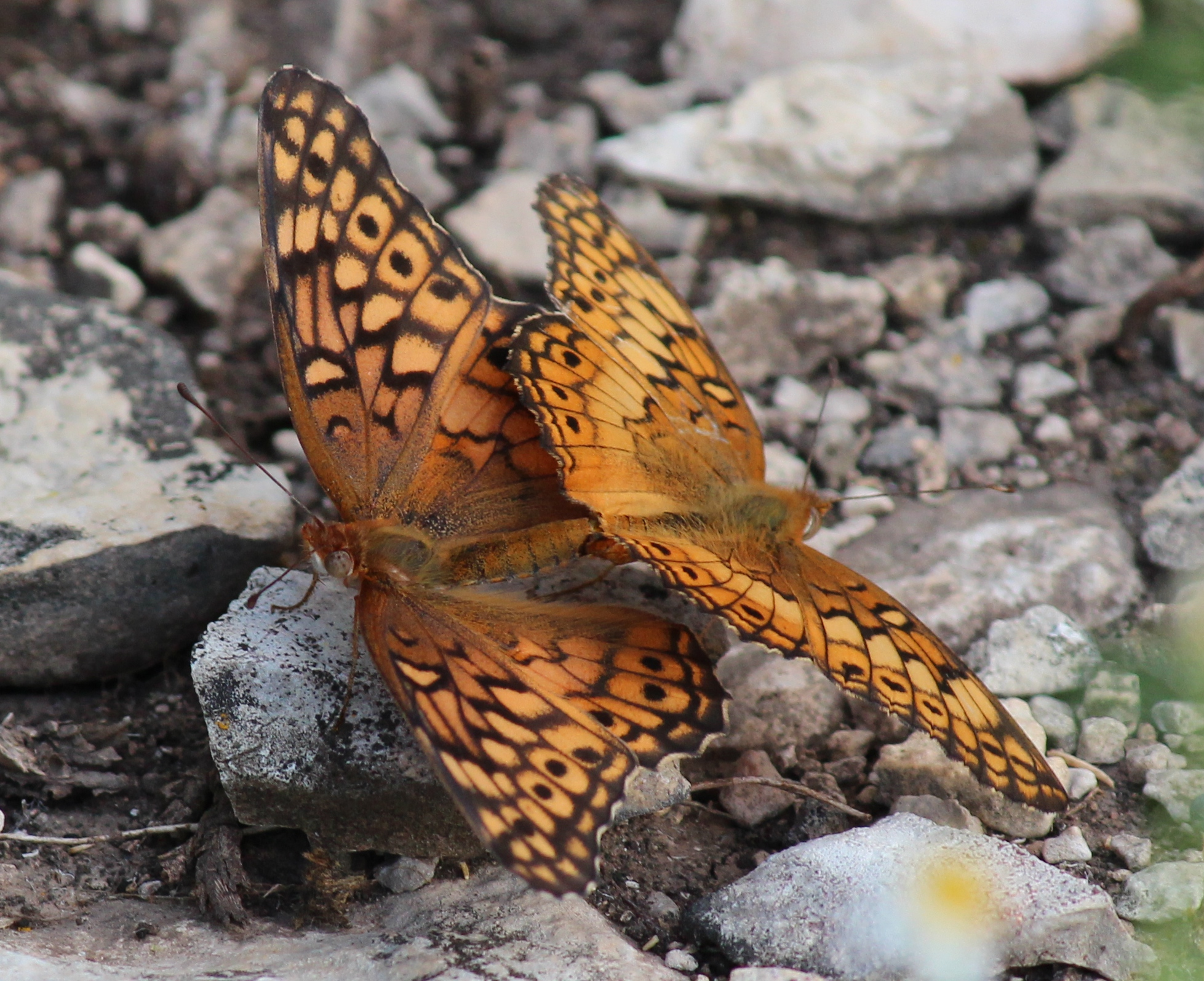
Beginning mating

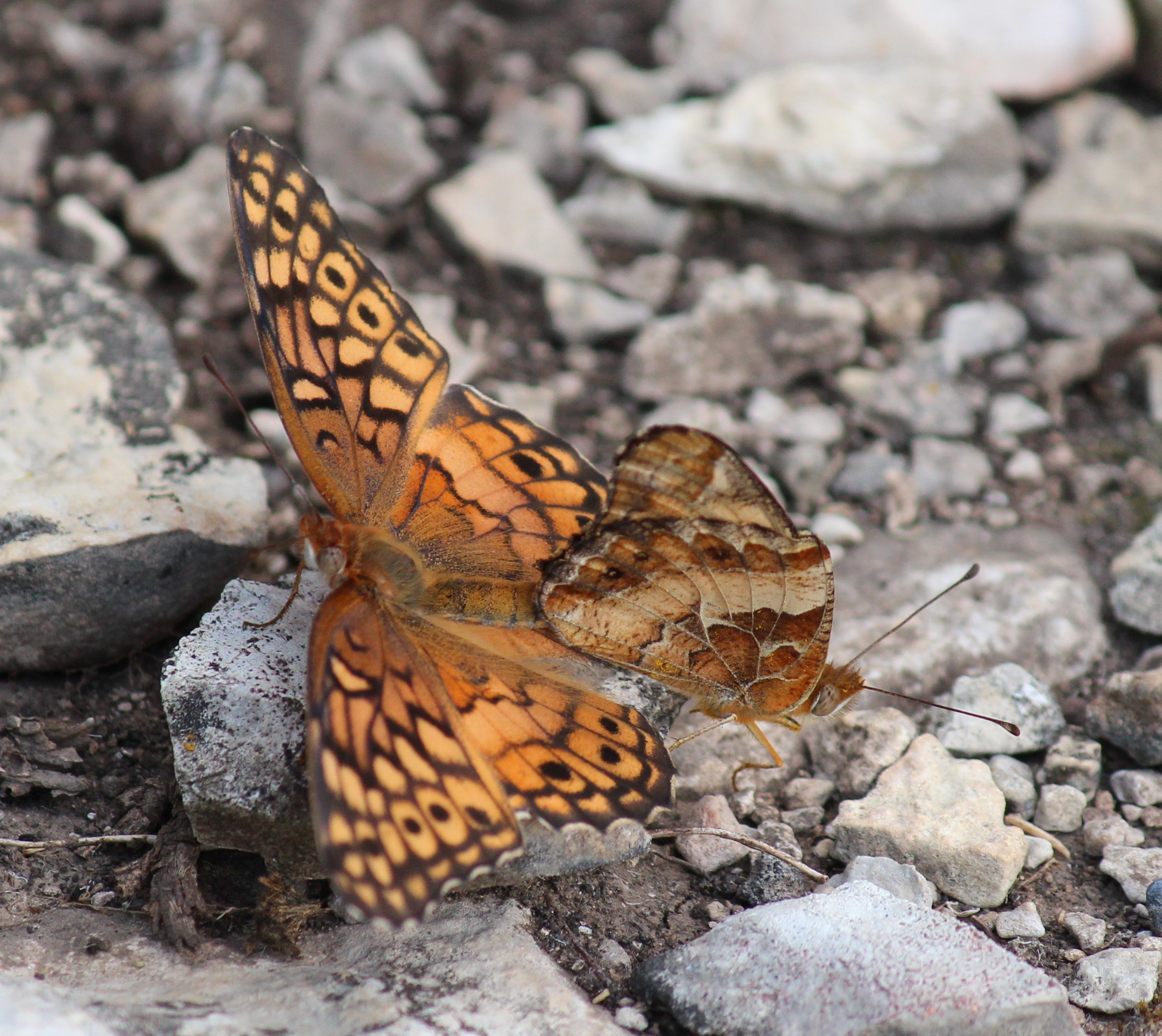
Mating

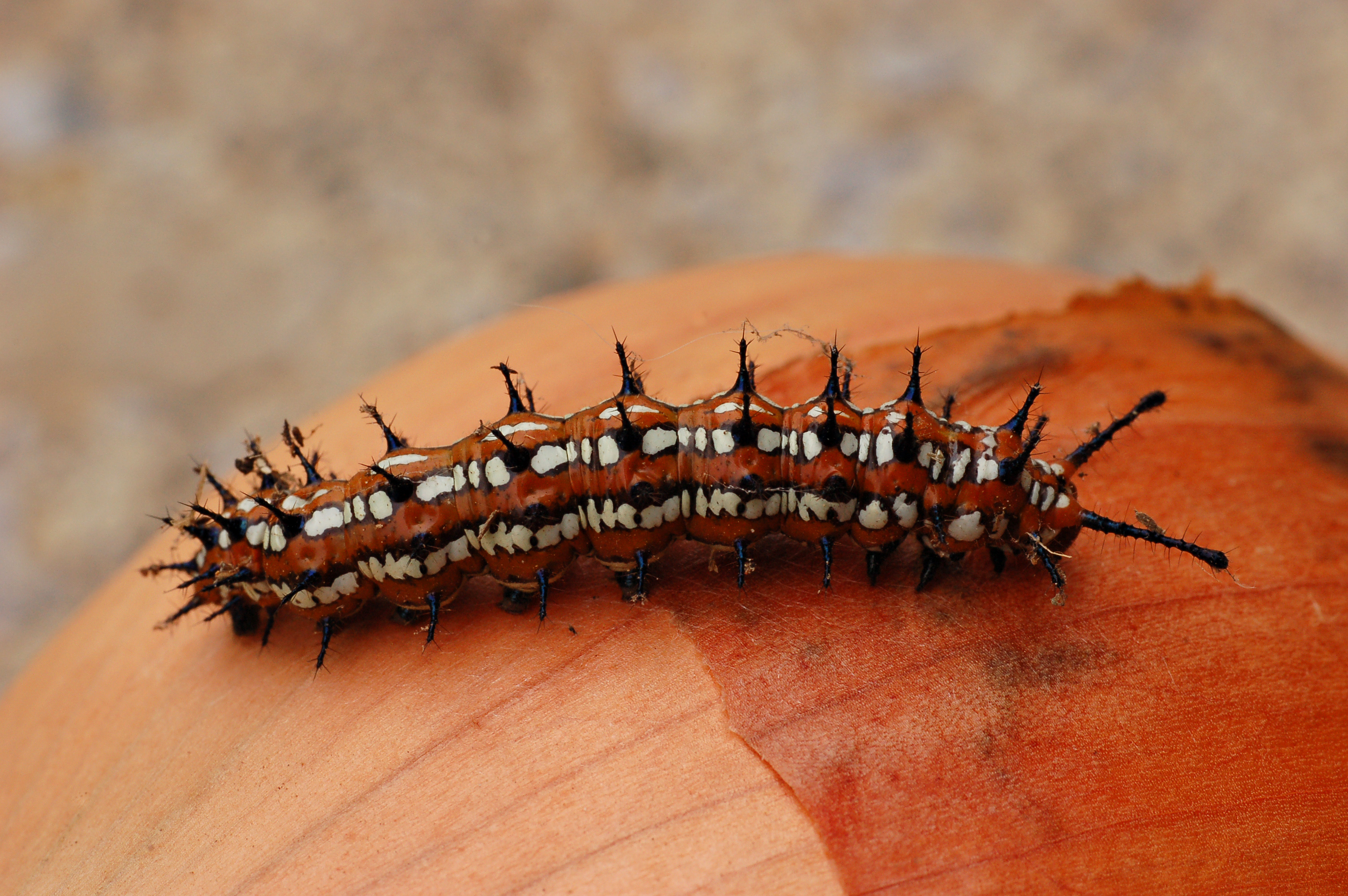
Larva

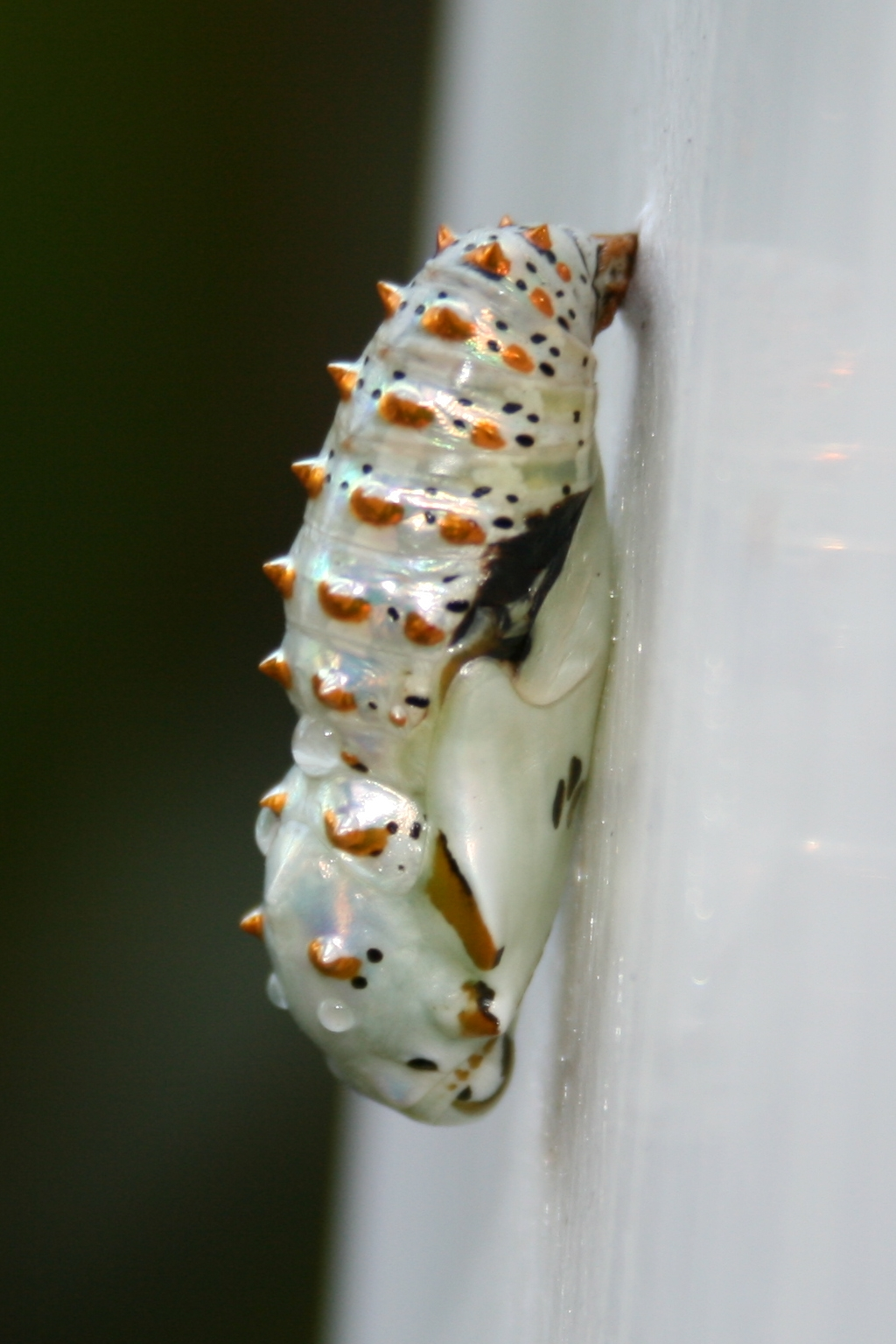
Chrysalis

Males actively patrol for females. Females lay their pale-green or cream-colored eggs singly on host plant leaves and stems. The larva eats the leaves, flowers, and stems of the food plant. The larva is red with black subdorsal and spiracular stripes infused with white spotting. In many individuals, the white is more conspicuous than the black. The red middorsal stripe bears white (sometimes black) oval-shaped spots, one per segment. It has six rows of black spines and has a pair of long, clubbed spines on the head. The chrysalis is mainly shiny white, with small black spots, a variable amount of brown markings, and orange and gold tubercules. Adults overwinter in the south and fly north each spring and summer. It has 2–3 broods per year.

== Host plants ==
This is a list of host plants used by the variegated fritillary:

- Five-wing spiderling, Boerhaavia intermedia
- Arizona swallow-wort, Melastoma arizonicum
- Babyslippers, Hybanthus verticillatus
- Southern flax, Linum australe
- Stiffstem flax, Linum rigidum
- Grooved yellow flax, Linum sulcatum
- Canadian moonseed, Menispermum canadense
- Mexican moonseed, Menispermum mexicanum
- Blue passionflower, Passiflora caerulea
- Foetid passionflower, Passiflora foetida
- Purple passionflower, Passiflora incarnata
- Plantain, Plantago species
- Mayapple, Podophyllum peltatum
- Common purslane, Portulaca oleracea
- Yellow alder, Turnera ulmifolia
- Lance-leaf stonecrop, Sedum lanceolatum
- American field pansy, Viola bicolor
- Common blue violet, Viola sororia
- Heartsease, Viola tricolor subspecies
