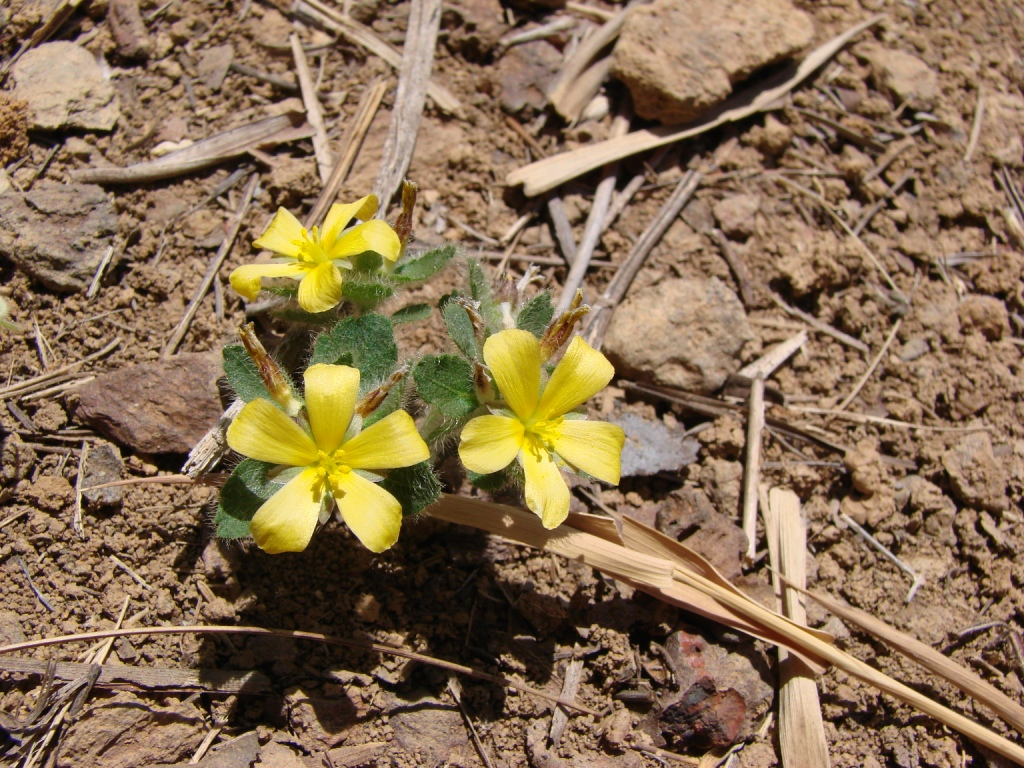

Scientific classification
- Kingdom: Plantae
- Clade: Tracheophytes
- Clade: Angiosperms
- Clade: Eudicots
- Clade: Rosids
- Order: Malpighiales
- Family: Passifloraceae
- Genus: Turnera
- Species: T. opifera

Binomial name
- Turnera opifera Cambess.

= Turnera opifera =

Species of flowering plant

Turnera opifera is a species of Turnera from Minas Gerais, Brazil.
