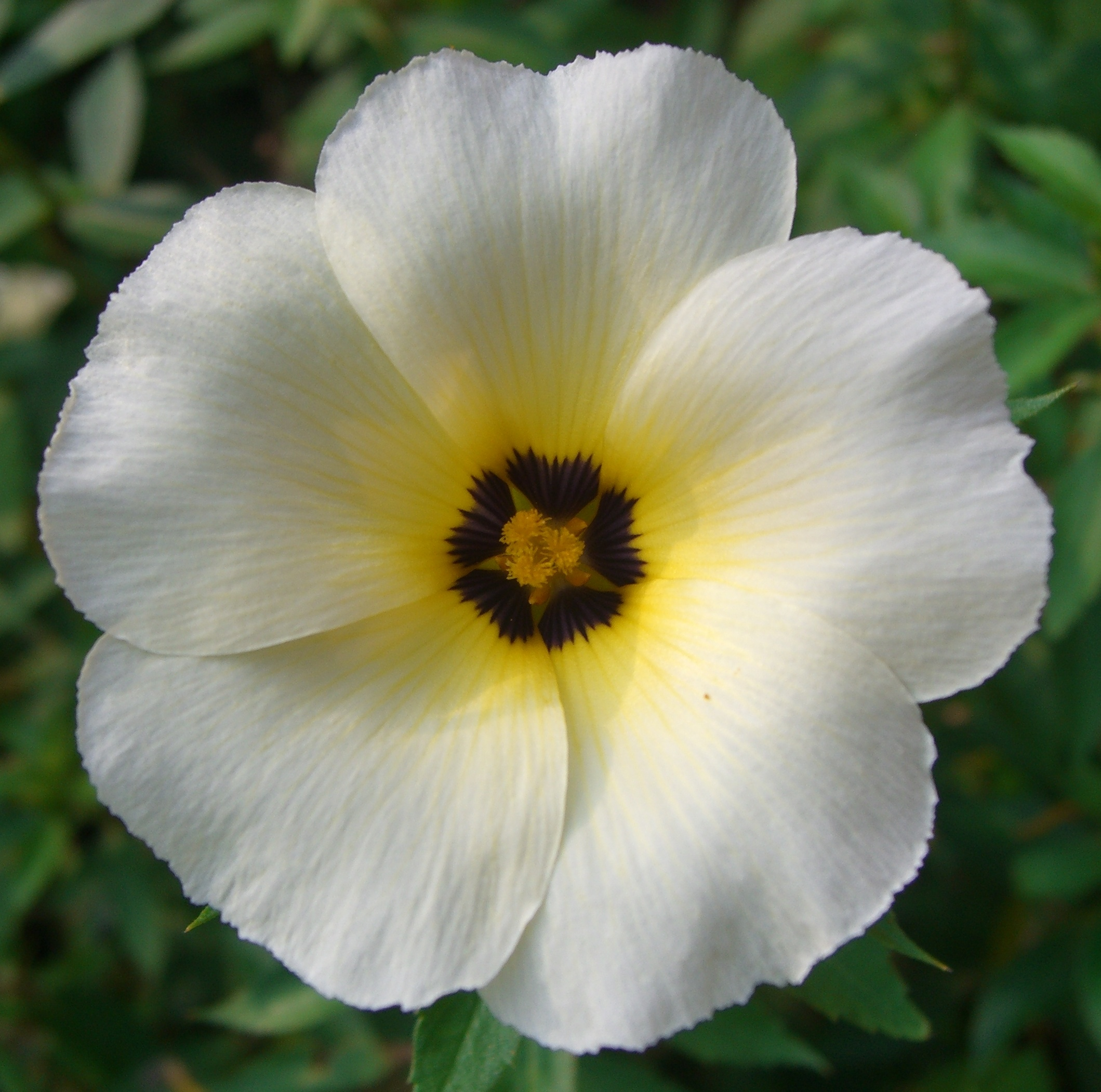

Scientific classification
- Kingdom: Plantae
- Clade: Tracheophytes
- Clade: Angiosperms
- Clade: Eudicots
- Clade: Rosids
- Order: Malpighiales
- Family: Passifloraceae
- Genus: Turnera
- Species: T. subulata

Binomial name
- Turnera subulata Sm.

Synonyms
- Turnera elegans Otto; Turnera mollis Kunth; Turnera peruviana Willd.; Turnera sericea Kunth

= Turnera subulata =

Species of flowering plant

Turnera subulata is a species of flowering subshrub in the passionflower family known by the common names white buttercup, sulphur alder, politician's flower, dark-eyed turnera, and white alder. Despite its names, it is not related to the buttercups or the alders. It is native to Central and South America, from Panama south to Brazil. It is well known in many other places as an introduced species, such as Malaysia, Indonesia, several other Pacific Islands, the Caribbean, and Florida in the United States.

It is commonly cultivated as a garden flower, but because of its high adaptability, it is also known as a garden weed.

== Growth ==
This plant is a perennial herb growing from a thick taproot and woody stem base. It reaches a maximum height around 80 cm (31 in). The leaves are roughly oval in shape with toothed edges. The undersides are glandular and coated in white hairs. The upper surfaces may be somewhat hairy, as well. The leaves are up to 9 cm (3.5 in) long.

=== Flower ===
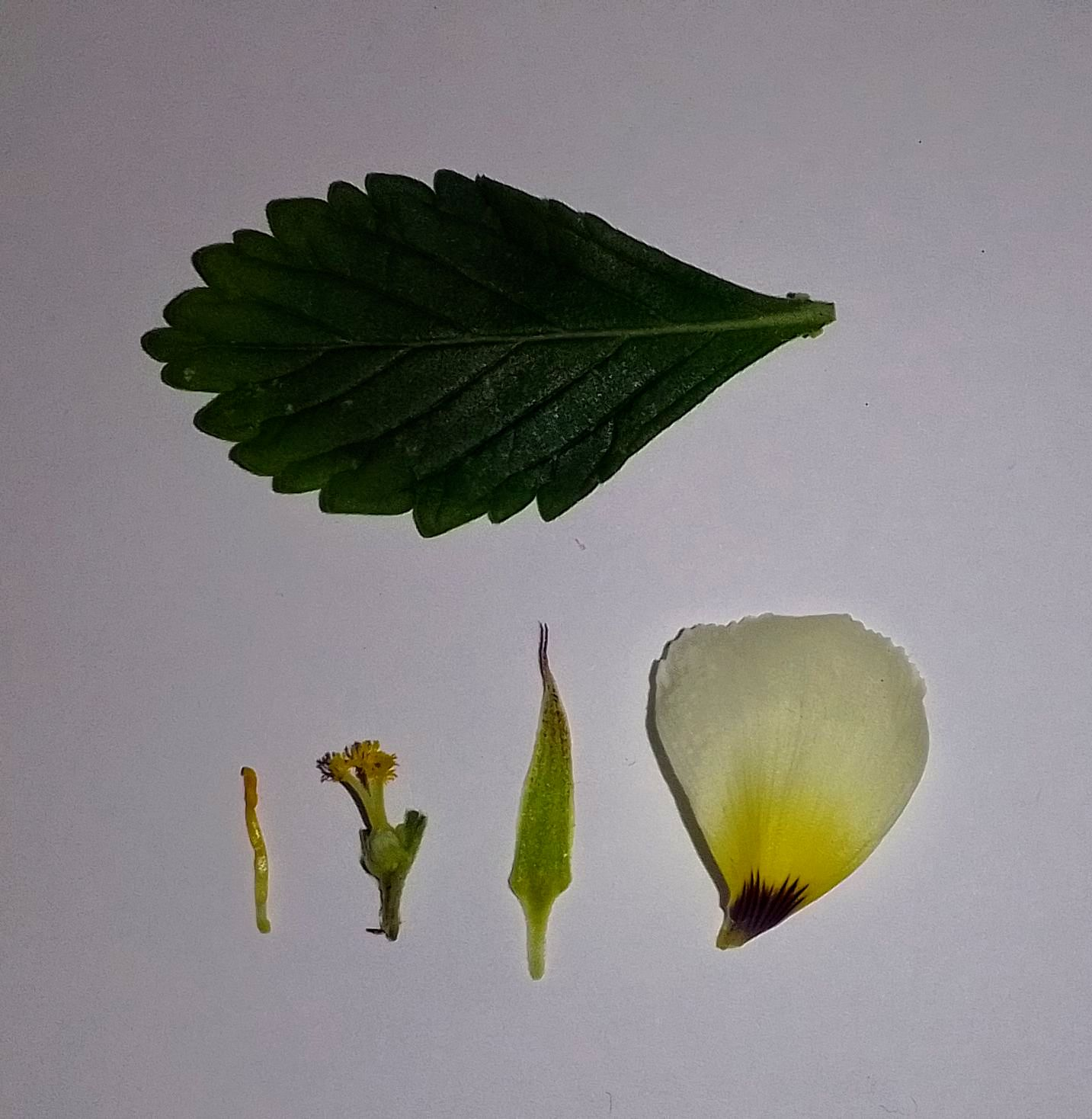
Parts of the flower and leaf of Turnera subulata

Flowers occur in the leaf axils, borne in calyces of hairy, glandular sepals. The flowers are a disc- to funnel-shape, and the petals are rounded to oval, the longest exceeding 3 cm (1.2 in). They are white or yellowish with darker bases. The dark patches at the bases are nectar guides. The center of the flower is rough, feeling like a cat's tongue. The flowers grow year round, and they tend to open in the early morning and close at about 11 a.m.

The plant is pollinated by a variety of insects. A common pollinator is the bee species Protomeliturga turnerae which prefers only its nectar and depend completely on it for reproduction. The male bee builds his territory around the plant, for example. Other insects observed at the plant include many other bee species, such as Trigona spinipes, Frieseomelitta doederleinii, and Plebeia flavocinta, butterflies such as Nisoniades macarius and Urbanus dorantes, and the beetle Pristimerus calcaratus.

=== Fruit and seeds ===
The fruit is a hairy capsule containing seeds with white arils. The seeds are dispersed by ants, who are likely attracted to their high lipid content.

== Appearance ==
Like most other Turnera, this species is heterostylous, with two morphs. The "pin" morph has long styles in its flowers, while the "thrum" morph has short styles. Both morphs produce the same amount of pollen. One study reported that during pollination, pin flowers receive more pollen from thrum flowers than from other pin flowers. The genes that cause this dimorphism in style size are the subject of current research. So far, it has been established that short styles contain proteins, polygalacturonases, that are absent in long styles.

== Traditional medicine ==
This plant, like other plants of the Turnera genus, is wildly used in traditional medicine for centuries, mainly in tropical and subtropical regions. In South America, its leaf extract is used to treat many conditions, such as diabetes, hypertension, tumors, influenza, chronic pain and inflammation. It is mainly used in the northeastern region of Brazil, where it is also used to treat amenorrhea and dysmenorrhea, being consumed as tea or infusions.

While little is known about its medicinal proprieties, the species has shown antioxidant, antibacterial and anti-inflammatory effects in tests, as well as modulating the effects of some drugs.
