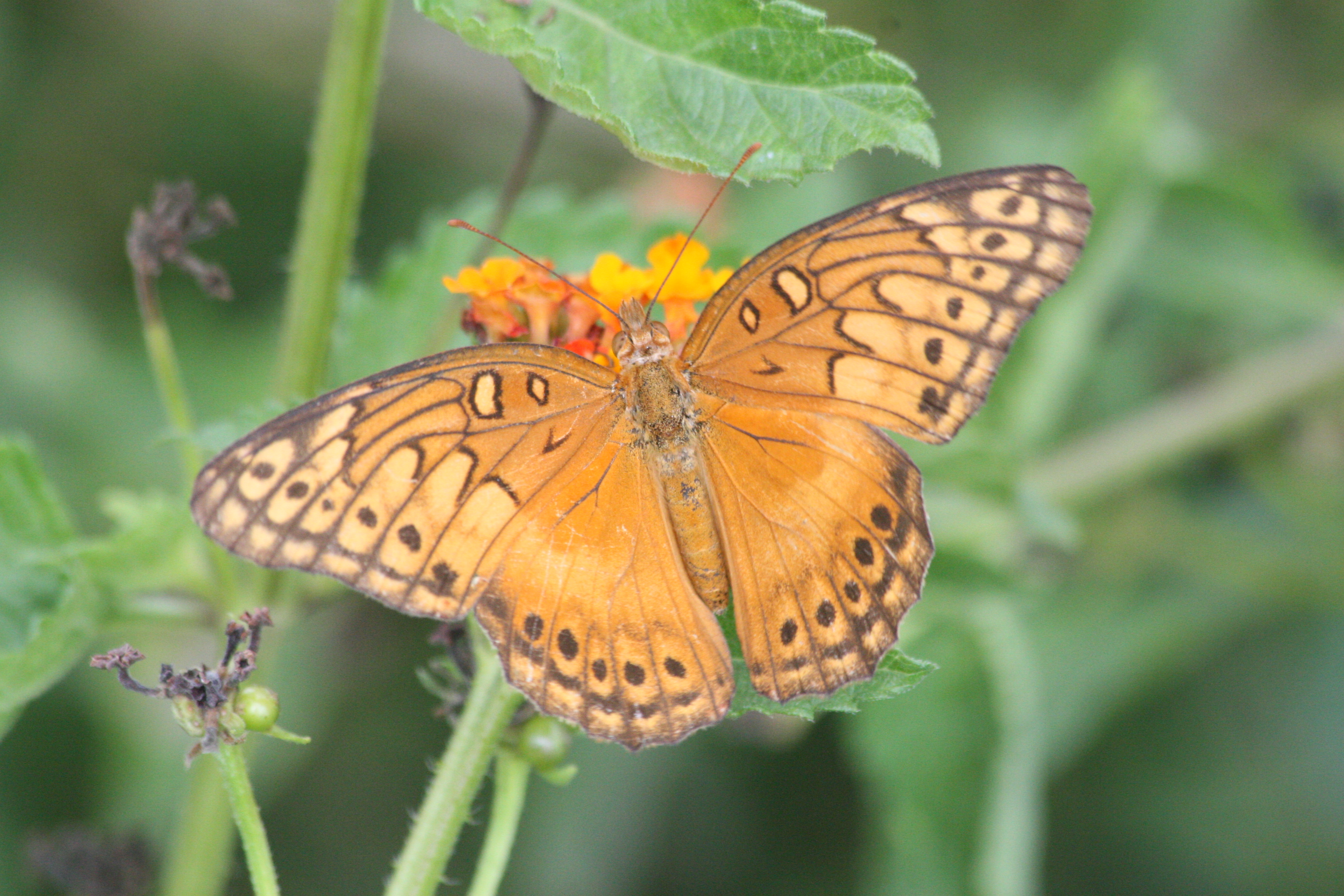

Scientific classification
- Domain: Eukaryota
- Kingdom: Animalia
- Phylum: Arthropoda
- Class: Insecta
- Order: Lepidoptera
- Family: Nymphalidae
- Genus: Euptoieta
- Species: E. hegesia

Binomial name
- Euptoieta hegesia (Cramer, 1779)

= Euptoieta hegesia =

Mexican fritillary

Species of butterfly

Euptoieta hegesia, the Mexican fritillary, is a North and South American butterfly in the family Nymphalidae.

== Description ==
The upperside of the wings is bright orange with the basal part of the hindwing unmarked. There is a row of submarginal black spots on both the forewing and the hindwing. The underside of the wings is yellow orange with no submarginal black spots. It has a wingspan of 2.5 to 3 inches.

== Similar species ==
The only similar species in the Mexican fritillary's range is the variegated fritillary (Euptoieta claudia). The variegated fritillary has black median lines on the upperside of the hindwing, and on the underside of the hindwing it has a pale postmedian band.

== Flight ==
The Mexican fritillary may be seen from mid-June to November in Arizona, from July to December in Texas and year-round in Mexico.

== Habitat ==
This species may be encountered in a wide range of open habitats and gardens.

== Life cycle ==
The larva is shiny red, with middorsal silver spots edged with black. It has a subdorsal row of white spots ringed with black, a spiracular silver line with black edges, and six rows of black spines. The red head has two long black spines with clubbed ends. The chrysalis is dark brown or rarely tan, with gold eyes and short gold lateral and subdorsal cones. On the wing cases, it has a black marking shaped like a "T". It has one to three broods per year.

== Host plants ==
Here is a list of host plants used by the Mexican fritillary:

- Foetid passionflower, Passiflora foetida
- Yellow alder, Turnera ulmifolia (used in Mexico and in the Antilles)
- Ipomoea maritima (used in Brazil)
- Damiana, Turnera diffusa

== links ==
- Media related to Euptoieta hegesia at Wikimedia Commons
- Data related to Euptoieta at Wikispecies
