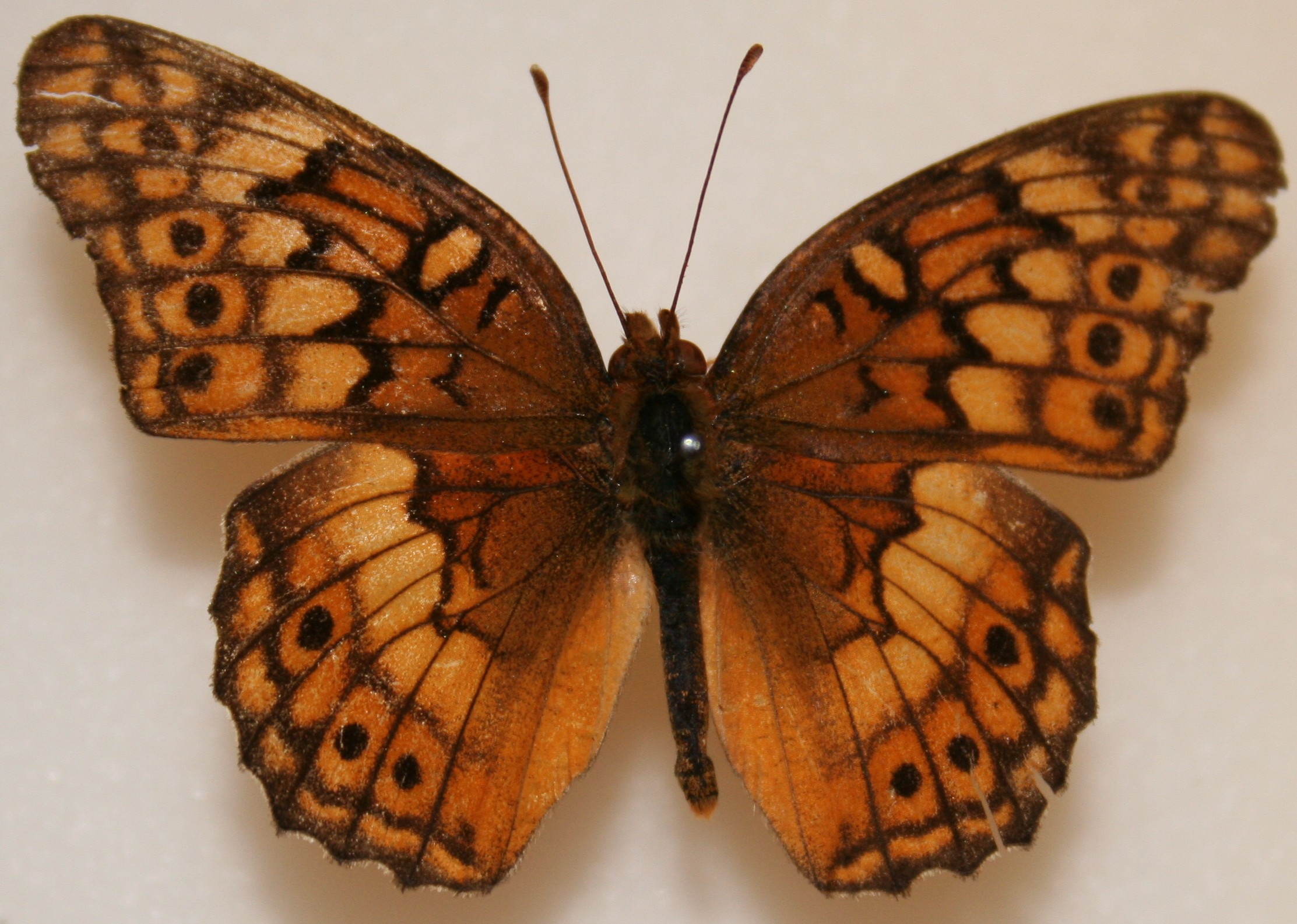
- Euptoieta claudia

Scientific classification
- Domain: Eukaryota
- Kingdom: Animalia
- Phylum: Arthropoda
- Class: Insecta
- Order: Lepidoptera
- Family: Nymphalidae
- Tribe: Argynnini
- Genus: Euptoieta (Doubleday, 1848)

Species
- See text

= Euptoieta =

Genus of brush-footed butterflies

Euptoieta is a genus of butterflies in the subfamily Heliconiinae found in the Neotropical ecological zone.

== Species ==
Listed alphabetically:

- Euptoieta bogotana (Staudinger, 1885)
- Euptoieta claudia (Cramer, 1775) – variegated fritillary
- Euptoieta hegesia (Cramer, 1779) – Mexican fritillary
- Euptoieta hortensia (Blanchard, 1852)
- Euptoieta perdistincta (Hall, 1930)
- Euptoieta poasina (Schaus, 1913)
- Euptoieta sunides (Hewitson, 1877)
- Euptoieta thekla (Hall, 1919)
