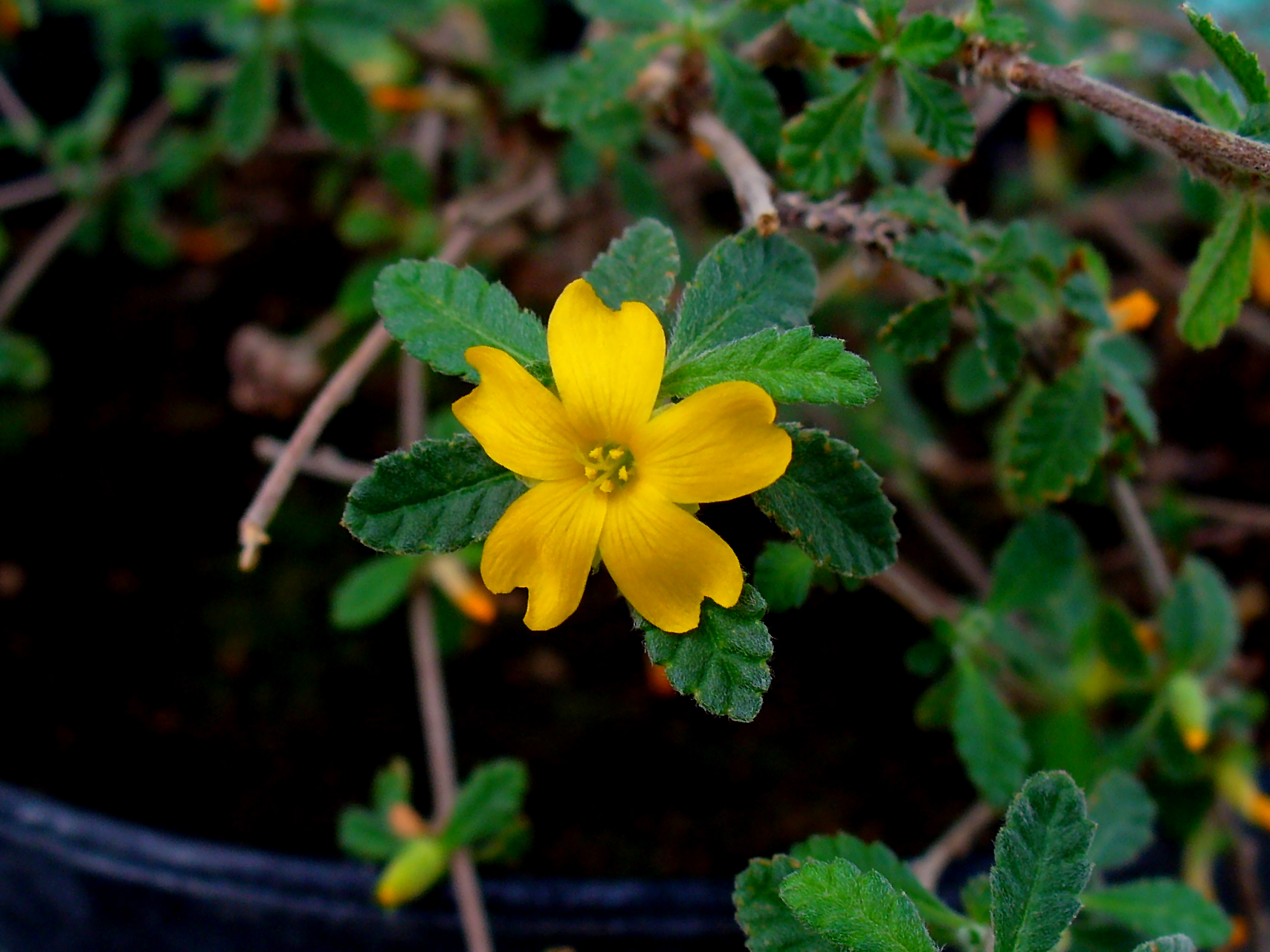
- Turnera diffusa var. aphrodisiaca

Scientific classification
- Kingdom: Plantae
- Clade: Embryophytes
- Clade: Tracheophytes
- Clade: Spermatophytes
- Clade: Angiosperms
- Clade: Eudicots
- Clade: Rosids
- Order: Malpighiales
- Family: Passifloraceae
- Genus: Turnera
- Species: T. diffusa

Binomial name
- Turnera diffusa Willd. ex Schult.

Varieties
- T. d. var. aphrodisiaca (G.H.Ward) Urb. T. d. var. diffusa

Synonyms
- List: Bohadschia humifusa C.Presl; Bohadschia microphylla Griseb.; Triacis microphylla (Desv.) Griseb.; Turnera aphrodisiaca Ward; Turnera diffusa var. aphrodisiaca (Ward) Urb.; Turnera humifusa Endl. ex Walp.; Turnera microphylla Desv.; Turnera pringlei Rose

= Turnera diffusa =

Species of shrub

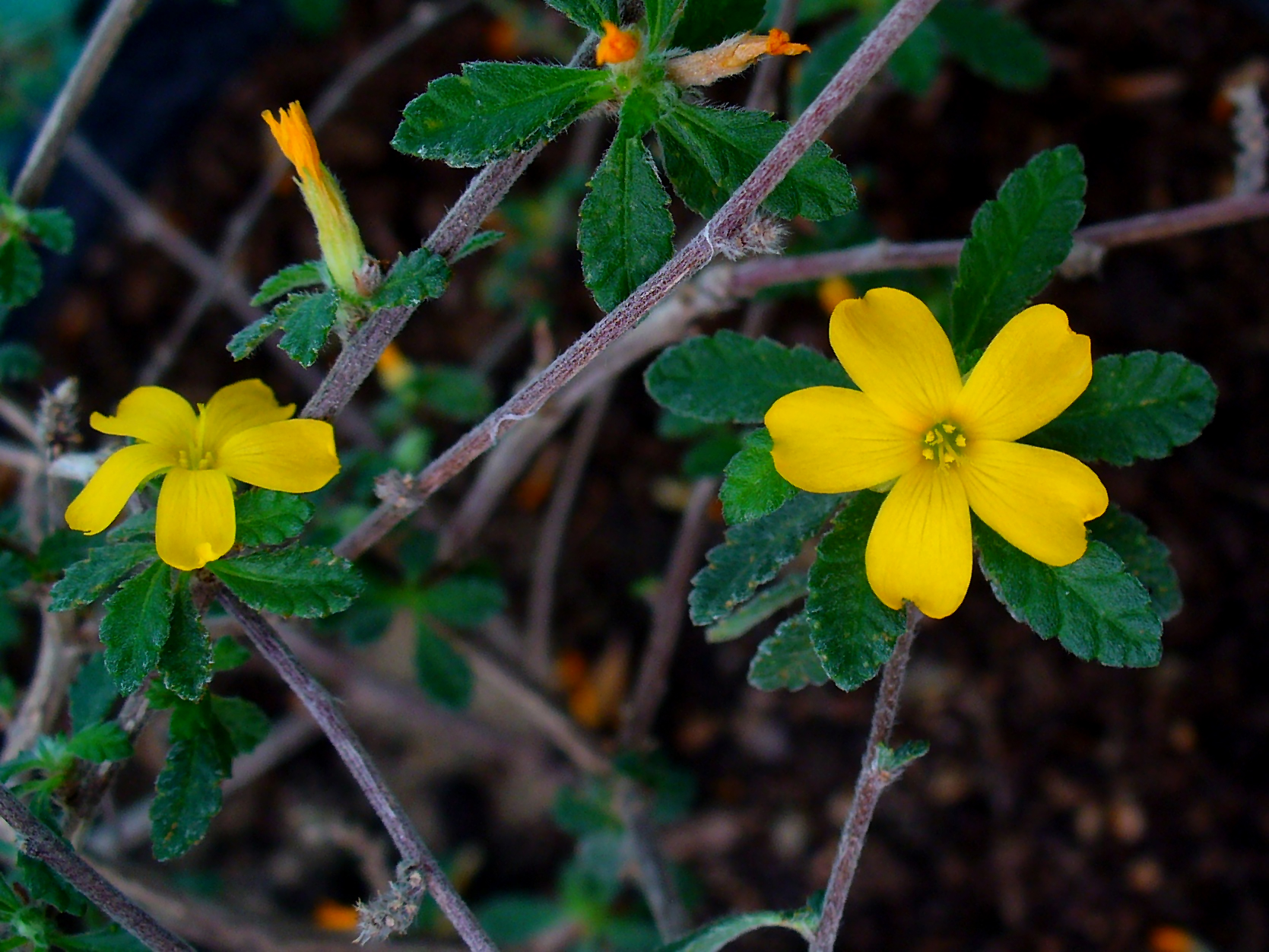
Turnera diffusa var. aphrodisiaca foliage and inflorescence

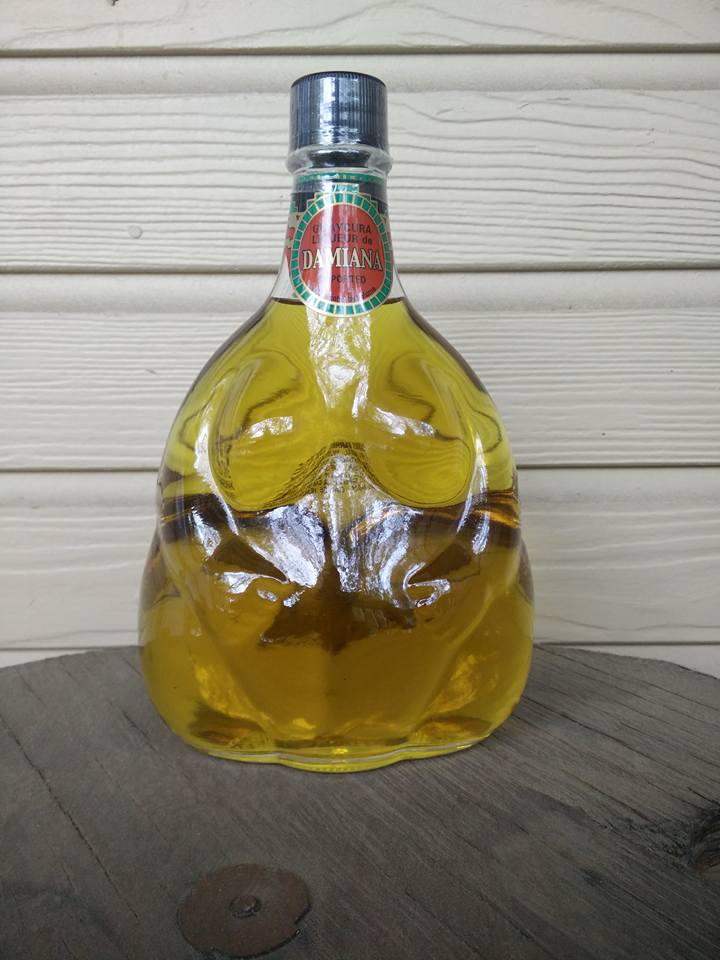
A bottle of Damiana liqueur. The shape of the bottle is modeled after that of a pregnant mother, a reference to Damiana's supposed aphrodisiac effect.

Turnera diffusa, known as damiana, is a shrub native to southern Texas in the United States, Mexico, Central America, South America, and the Caribbean. It belongs to the family Passifloraceae.

Damiana is a relatively small, woody shrub that produces small, aromatic flowers. It blossoms in early to late summer, followed by fruits that taste similar to figs. The shrub is said to have a strong spice-like odor somewhat like chamomile, due to the aromatic compounds present in the plant.

Damiana is traditionally used in Mexican liqueurs and margaritas, historically featured in 19th-century patent medicines as an alleged aphrodisiac, and today is valued in herbal teas and smoking blends for its calming and mild psychoactive effects. It contains a complex mix of phytochemicals—including flavonoids like apigenin and acacetin, terpenoids, phenolics, cyanogenic glycosides, and others. It serves as a host plant for the Mexican fritillary (Euptoieta hegesia), a butterfly.

Many plants and seeds sold as T. diffusa are actually Turnera ulmifolia (“false damiana”), a different species with different chemical properties and uses, and this misidentification mostly happens in horticultural sales, not in herbal product markets.

== Uses ==
Damiana is an ingredient in a traditional Mexican liqueur, which is sometimes used in lieu of triple sec in margaritas. Mexican folklore claims that it was used in the "original" margarita. The damiana margarita is popular in the Los Cabos region of Mexico.

Damiana was included in several 19th-century patent medicines, such as Pemberton's French Wine Coca. The leaves were omitted from that product's non-alcoholic counterpart, Coca-Cola. In folklore, the plant was believed to be an aphrodisiac, hence its sometimes used binomial synonym, Turnera aphrodisiaca.

Beyond its historical use in drinks, Damiana continues to be a valued herb for its ability to induce relaxation and improve emotional well-being. It is commonly found in modern herbal teas and smoking blends, where it is used for its calming, mild psychoactive effects.

== Phytochemistry ==
Damiana contains damianin; tetraphyllin B; gonzalitosin I; arbutin; tricosan-2-one; acacetin; p-cymene; β-sitosterol; 1,8-cineole; apigenin; α-pinene; β-carotene; β-pinene; tannins; thymol; and hexacosanol. In total, 22 flavonoids, maltol glucoside, phenolics, seven cyanogenic glycosides, monoterpenoids, sesquiterpenoids, triterpenoids, the polyterpene ficaprenol-11, fatty acids, and caffeine have been found in the genus Turnera. As of 2006, damiana's constituents have not been identified for their effects attributed to the whole herb.

== Ecology ==
T. diffusa is a host plant for the Mexican fritillary (Euptoieta hegesia), a butterfly.

== Misidentification in commerce ==
Viable plant and seed material sold as T. diffusa from both private and commercial sources largely turns out to be misidentified Turnera ulmifolia (a.k.a. "False Damiana"), a closely related species. This widespread issue has been noted by the scientific community, and has created much confusion among both amateur and professional horticulturists alike. Mature stems of T. diffusa are woody, with small, grayed green leaves 13 to 16 mm long, 4.5 to 5.5 mm wide, obtuse at the apex, and strongly aromatic when crushed. T. ulmifolia is differentiated by herbaceous stems, larger blue-green leaves that are strongly dentate with a pointed apex, and only weakly aromatic. One scientific study however, demonstrated this confusion being mostly associated with horticultural commerce, and does not extend appreciably to commercial herbal products, most of which exhibit constituents that can be definitively traced to T. diffusa.
