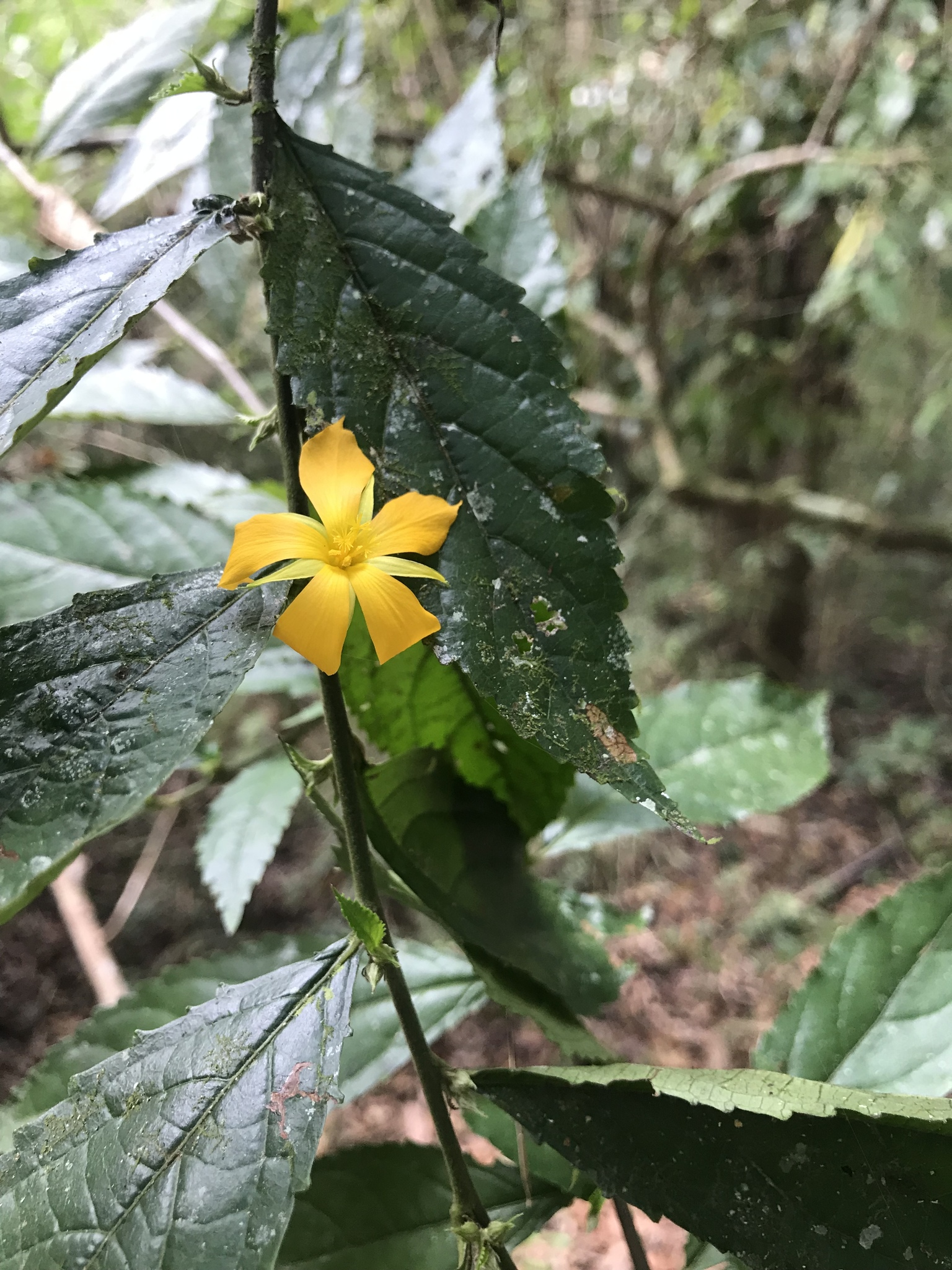

Scientific classification
- Kingdom: Plantae
- Clade: Tracheophytes
- Clade: Angiosperms
- Clade: Eudicots
- Clade: Rosids
- Order: Malpighiales
- Family: Passifloraceae
- Genus: Turnera
- Species: T. panamensis

Binomial name
- Turnera panamensis Urban, 1883

= Turnera panamensis =

Species of flowering plant

Turnera panamensis is a species of flowering plant in the passionflower family. It is native to Central America and Northwestern Colombia.
