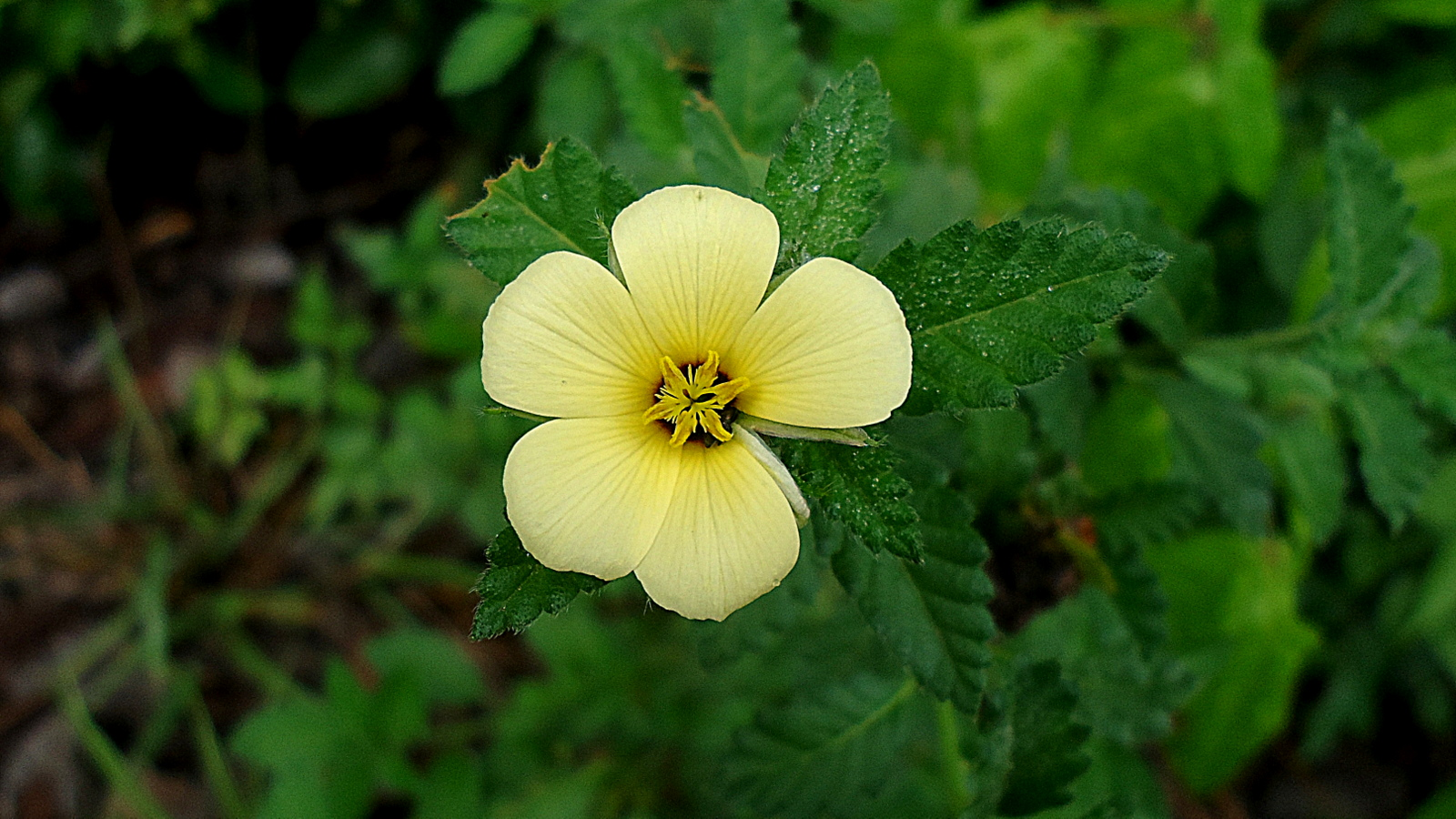

Scientific classification
- Kingdom: Plantae
- Clade: Tracheophytes
- Clade: Angiosperms
- Clade: Eudicots
- Clade: Rosids
- Order: Malpighiales
- Family: Passifloraceae
- Genus: Turnera
- Species: T. chamaedrifolia

Binomial name
- Turnera chamaedrifolia Cambess. 1829

= Turnera chamaedrifolia =

Species of flowering plant

Turnera chamaedrifolia is a species of Turnera in Bahia and Minas Gerais, Brazil.
