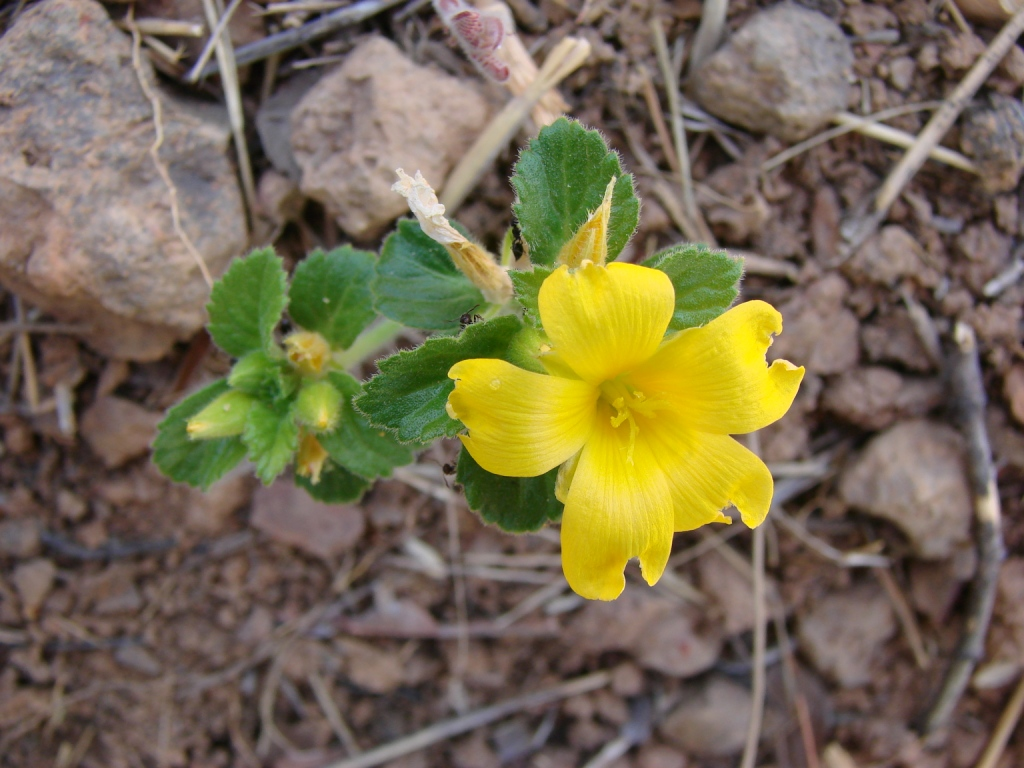

Scientific classification
- Kingdom: Plantae
- Clade: Tracheophytes
- Clade: Angiosperms
- Clade: Eudicots
- Clade: Rosids
- Order: Malpighiales
- Family: Passifloraceae
- Genus: Turnera
- Species: T. pumilea

Binomial name
- Turnera pumilea L. 1759

= Turnera pumilea =

Species of flowering plant

Turnera pumilea is a species of Turnera from Jamaica.
