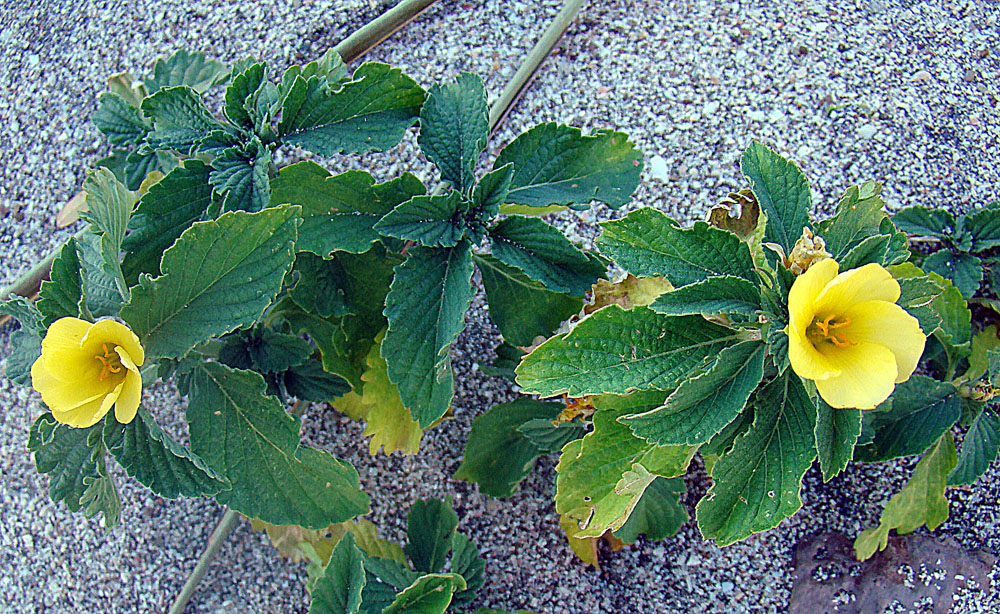

Scientific classification
- Kingdom: Plantae
- Clade: Tracheophytes
- Clade: Angiosperms
- Clade: Eudicots
- Clade: Rosids
- Order: Malpighiales
- Family: Passifloraceae
- Genus: Turnera
- Species: T. scabra

Binomial name
- Turnera scabra Millsp. 1900

= Turnera scabra =

Species of flowering plant

Turnera scabra is a species of Turnera from Central to South America.

== Reproduction ==
The Turnera scabra has two types of flowers: long-styled and short-styled, in which both reject their own pollen distinctly, preventing self-fertilization.
