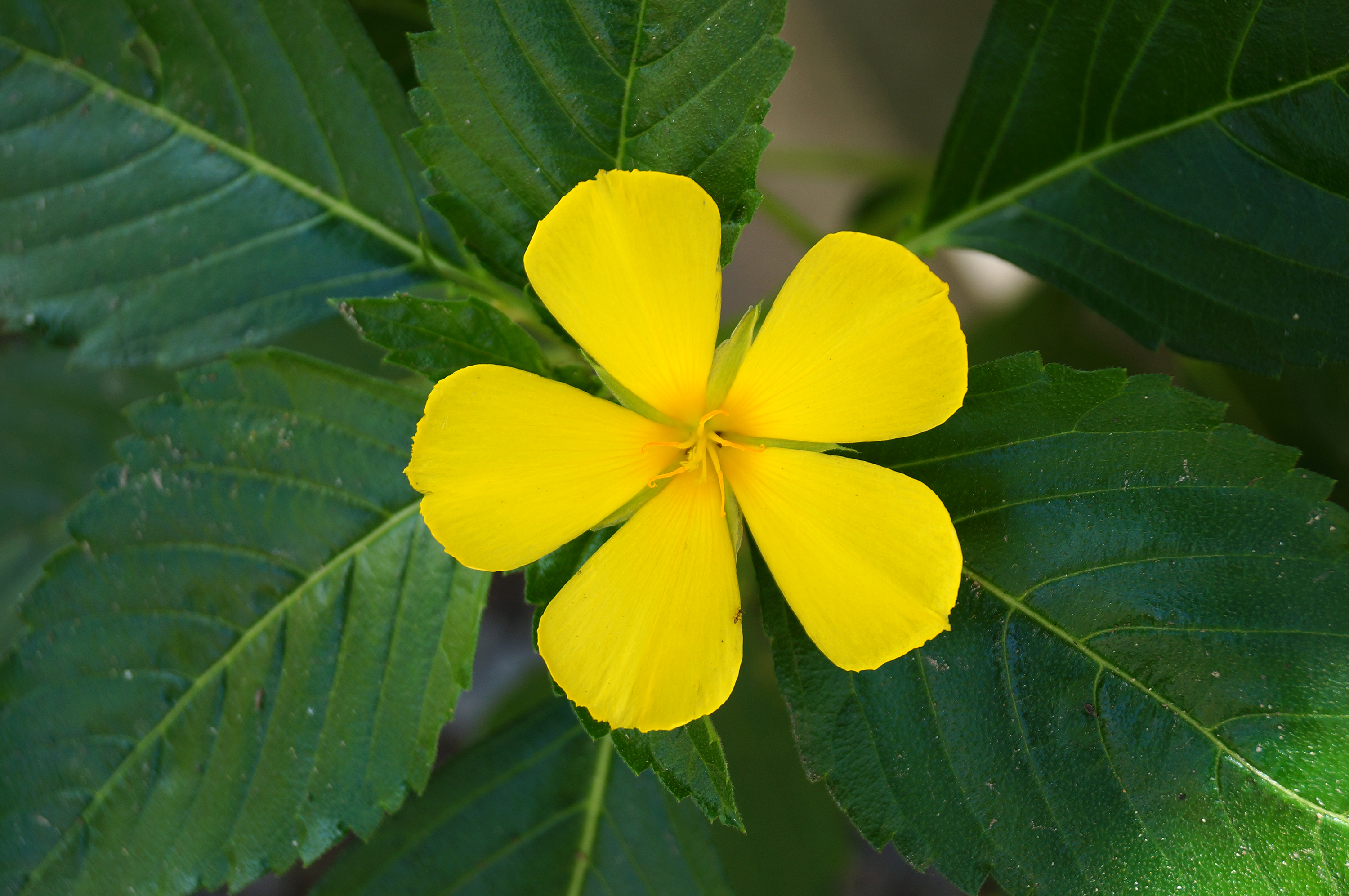

Scientific classification
- Kingdom: Plantae
- Clade: Tracheophytes
- Clade: Angiosperms
- Clade: Eudicots
- Clade: Rosids
- Order: Malpighiales
- Family: Passifloraceae
- Genus: Turnera
- Species: T. ulmifolia

Binomial name
- Turnera ulmifolia L.

= Turnera ulmifolia =

Species of flowering plant

Turnera ulmifolia, commonly known as the ramgoat dashalong, yellow alder, Cuban buttercup or West Indian holly, is a species of flowering plant in the family Passifloraceae. It is native to Mexico, Central America, the Caribbean, and parts of northern South America and southern Florida. The plant is widely cultivated as an ornamental in tropical and subtropical regions, and has become naturalized worldwide.

The species is sometimes confused with the closely related Turnera diffusa (damiana), leading to misidentification in horticultural and herbal trade.

== Description ==
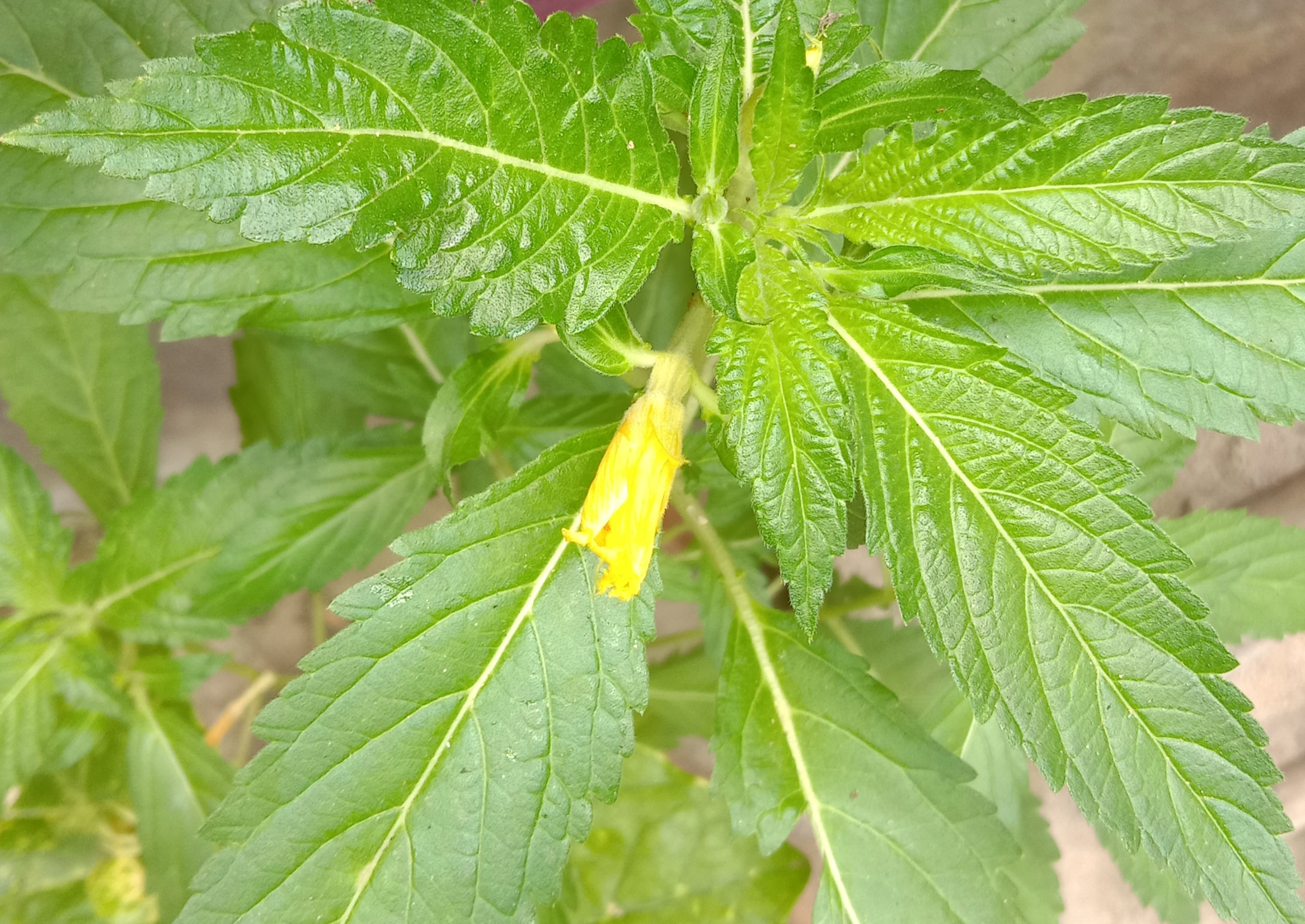
Immature yellow flower

Turnera ulmifolia is a perennial subshrub or small shrub that typically grows 0.5–1.5 m tall. The stems are erect and become woody at the base with age. The leaves are alternate, elliptic to lanceolate, and usually 2–10 cm long, with serrated margins and a slightly rough surface. The plant produces solitary bright yellow flowers in the leaf axils. Each flower has five petals and five sepals, with numerous stamens surrounding the central pistil. The flowers are short-lived: they typically open early in the morning around sunrise and wilt or close by midday, lasting only a few hours. The fruit is a small capsule containing several seeds which are released when the capsule splits open at maturity.

== Taxonomy ==
The species was first described by Carl Linnaeus in 1753 in Species Plantarum. Historically, the genus Turnera was placed in the family Turneraceae, but molecular phylogenetic studies led to the group being incorporated into the family Passifloraceae.

The specific epithet ulmifolia means “elm-leaved,” referring to the serrated leaf margins resembling those of species in the genus Ulmus.

== Distribution and habitat ==
The native range of Turnera ulmifolia extends from Mexico and Central America through the Caribbean to northern South America and southern Florida. The species commonly grows in open, sunny habitats including roadsides, coastal scrub, disturbed areas, grasslands, and forest clearings. It tolerates poor soils and drought conditions and can grow in cracks of pavement, walls, and rocky substrates.

Due to its ornamental use, it has been introduced and naturalized in tropical regions worldwide, including parts of Africa, Asia, and the Pacific islands.

== Ecology ==
The flowers provide nectar for a variety of pollinators including bees and butterflies. The plant is capable of self-pollination but also benefits from insect pollination. Larvae of certain butterflies, including the tawny coster (Acraea terpsicore), feed on the leaves. Seeds may be dispersed by ants and other insects that collect and transport them from fallen fruits, aiding the plant’s spread in suitable habitats.

== Cultivation ==
Turnera ulmifolia is widely cultivated as an ornamental shrub due to its bright yellow flowers, drought tolerance, and ability to bloom for long periods in warm climates. It grows best in full sun and well-drained soils and is easily propagated by seeds or cuttings. Because it readily self-seeds and tolerates disturbed environments, it can escape cultivation and become naturalized.

== Invasive status ==
In some regions outside its native range, including several Pacific islands and tropical parts of Asia, Turnera ulmifolia is considered an invasive or potentially invasive species. Its rapid reproduction, tolerance of poor soils, and ability to form dense stands allow it to compete with native vegetation in disturbed habitats.

== Phytochemistry ==
Phytochemical studies of Turnera ulmifolia have identified flavonoids, alkaloids, tannins, and other polyphenols.

== Traditional medicine ==
The plant was used in traditional medicine in parts of South Americ and the Caribbean during the 20th century.
