= List of butterflies of North America (Hesperiidae) =

== Subfamily Pyrrhopyginae: firetips ==
- Dull firetip, Pyrrhopyge araxes

== Subfamily Pyrginae: spread-wing skippers ==
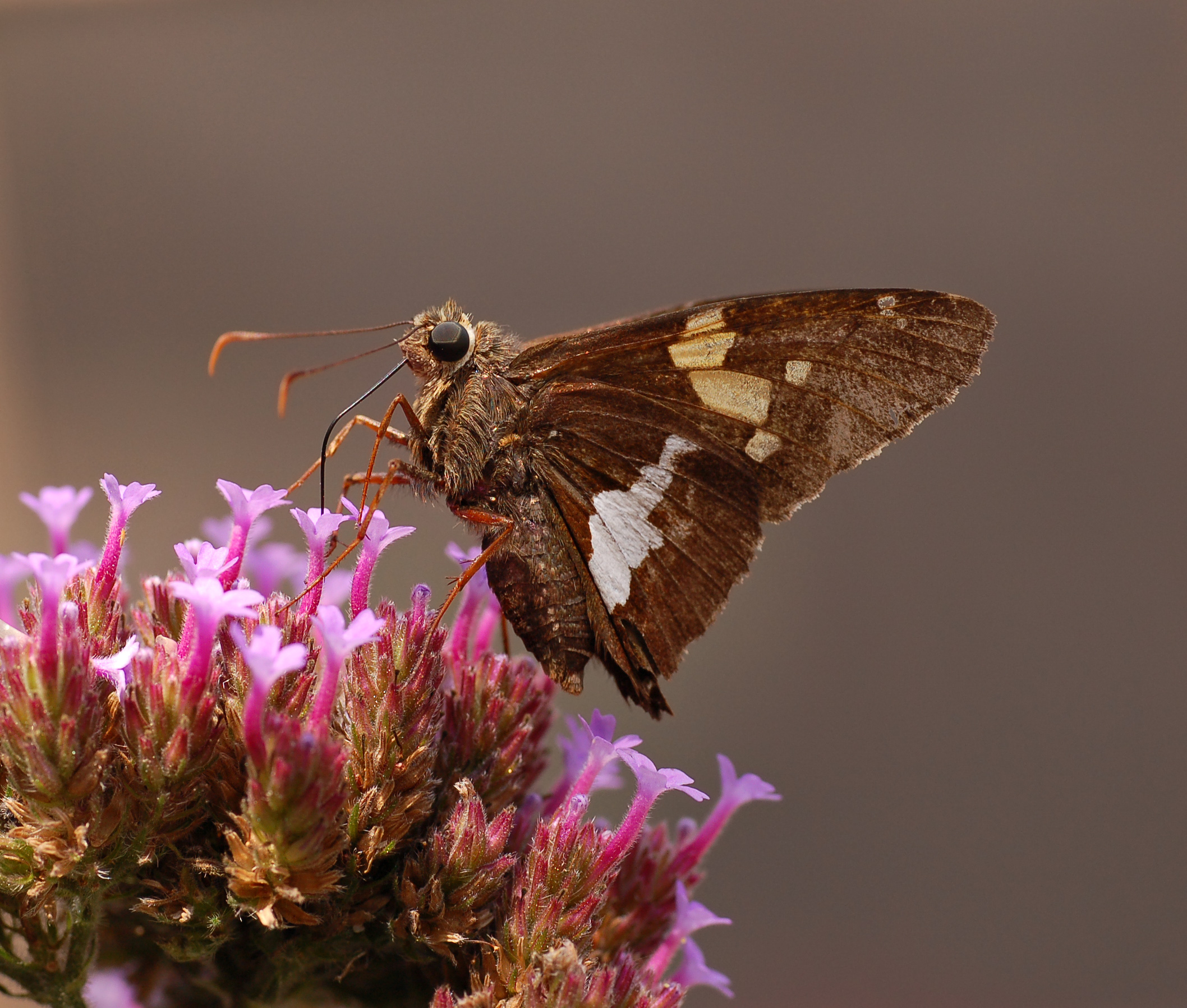
Silver-spotted skipper, Epargyreus clarus

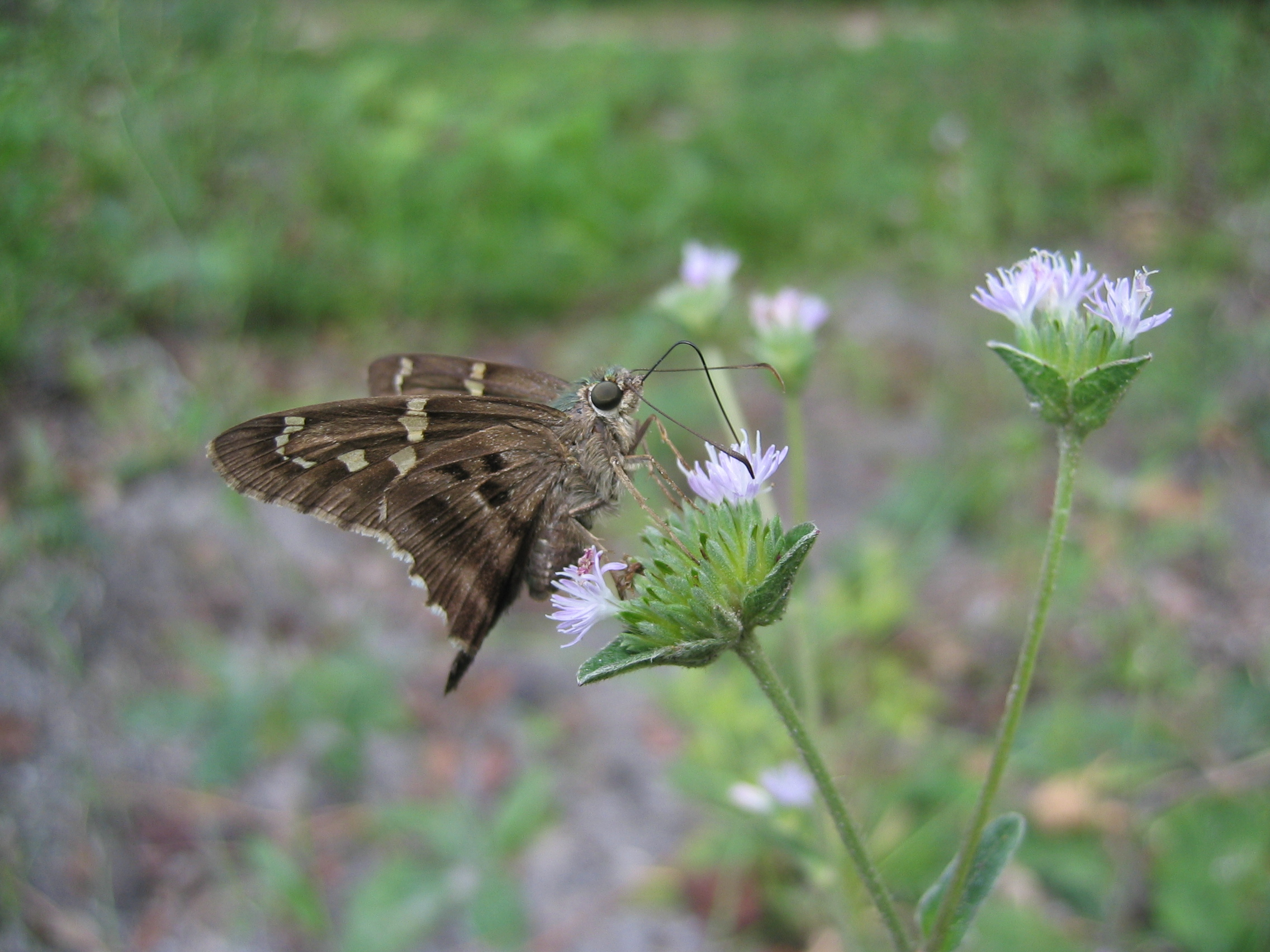
Long-tailed skipper, Urbanus proteus

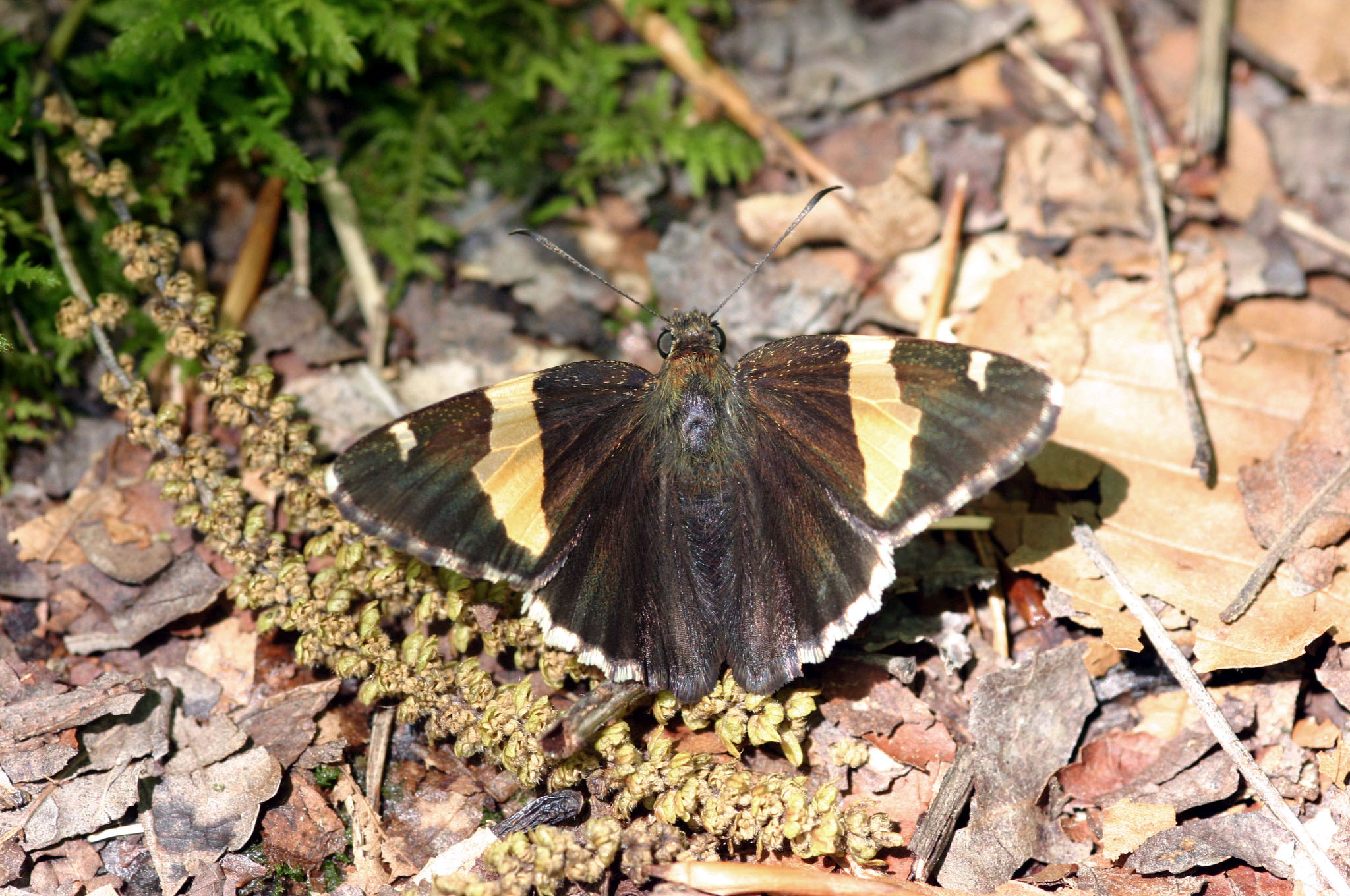
Golden banded-skipper, Autochton cellus

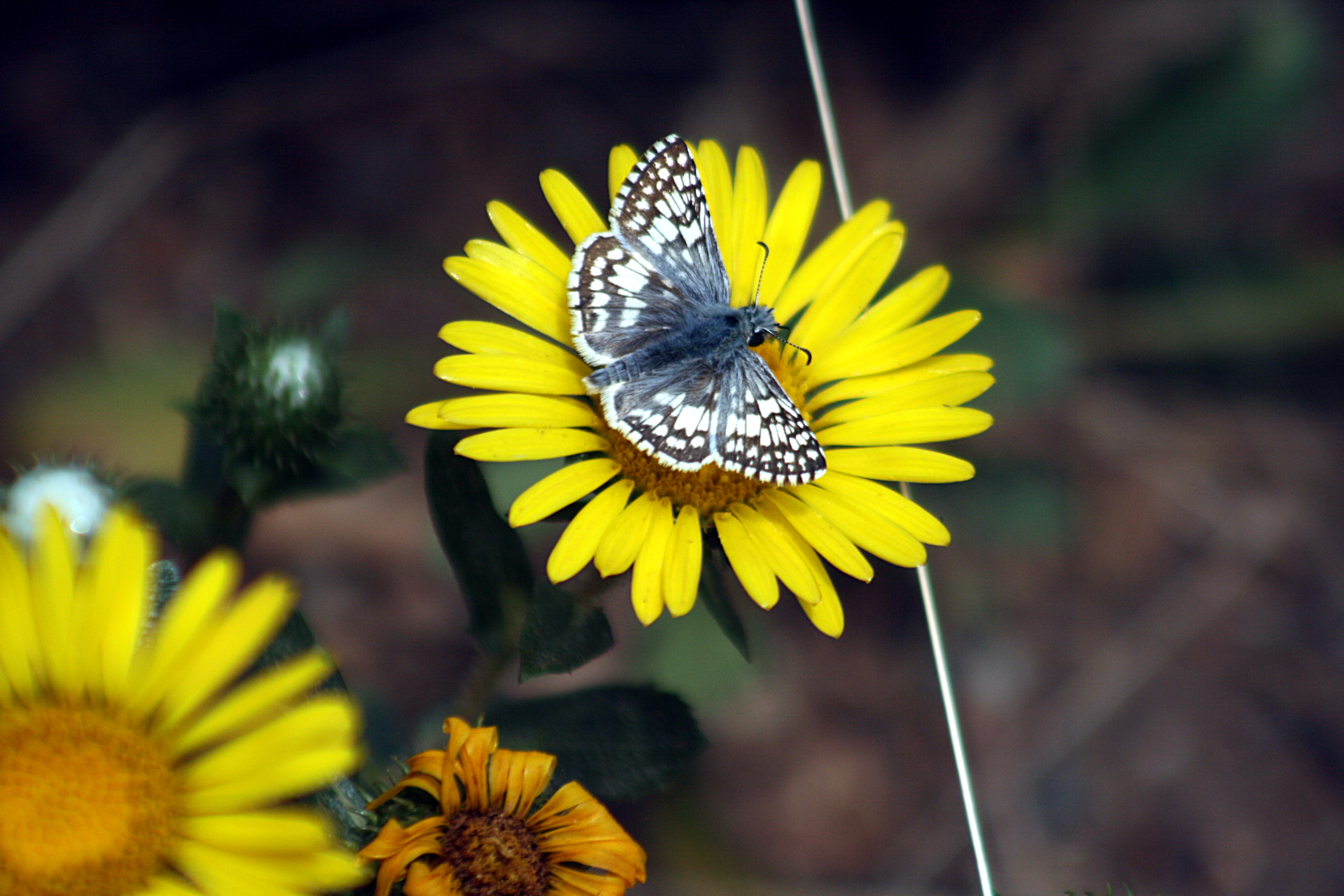
Common checkered-skipper, Pyrgus communis

- Beautiful beamer, Phocides belus
- Mercurial skipper, Proteides mercurius
- Mangrove skipper, Phocides pigmalion
- Guava skipper, Phocides polybius
- Teal beamer, Phocides urania
- Silver-spotted skipper, Epargyreus clarus
- Broken silverdrop, Epargyreus exadeus
- Pepper-spotted silverdrop, Epargyreus socus orizaba
- Weak-frosted silverdrop, Epargyreus spinosa
- Zestos skipper, Epargyreus zestos
- Hammock skipper, Polygonus leo
- Manuel's skipper, Polygonus manueli
- White-striped longtail, Chioides catillus
- Zilpa longtail, Chioides zilpa
- Golden-spotted aguna, Aguna asander
- Emerald aguna, Aguna claxon
- Tailed aguna, Aguna metophis
- Mottled longtail, Typhedanus undulatus
- Mexican longtail, Polythrix mexicana
- Eight-spotted longtail, Polythrix octomaculata
- Short-tailed skipper, Zestusa dorus
- White-crescent longtail, Codatractus alcaeus
- Arizona skipper, Codatractus arizonensis
- Valeriana skipper, Codatractus mysie
- Double-striped longtail, Urbanus belli
- Dorantes longtail, Urbanus dorantes
- White-tailed longtail, Urbanus doryssus
- Esmeralda longtail, Urbanus esmeraldus
- Turquoise longtail, Urbanus evona
- Brown longtail, Urbanus procne
- Pronus longtail, Urbanus pronus
- Long-tailed skipper, Urbanus proteus
- Plain longtail, Urbanus simplicius
- Tanna longtail, Urbanus tanna
- Teleus longtail, Urbanus teleus
- Cobalt longtail, Urbanus viterboana
- Frosted flasher, Astraptes alardus
- Yellow-tipped flasher, Astraptes anaphus
- Small-spotted flasher, Astraptes egregius
- Two-barred flasher, Astraptes fulgerator
- Gilbert's flasher, Astraptes gilberti
- Golden banded-skipper, Autochton cellus
- Chisos banded skipper, Autochton cincta
- Spiky banded-skipper, Autochton neis
- Sonoran banded-skipper, Autochton pseudocellus
- Sierra Madre banded-skipper, Autochton siermadror
- Hoary edge, Achalarus lyciades
- Desert cloudywing, Achalarus casica
- Dark cloudywing, Achalarus tehuanaca
- Skinner's cloudywing, Achalarus albociliatus
- Coyote cloudywing, Achalarus toxeus
- Jalapus cloudywing, Achalarus jalapus
- Southern cloudywing, Thorybes bathyllus
- Northern cloudywing, Thorybes pylades
- Western cloudywing, Thorybes diversus
- Mexican cloudywing, Thorybes mexicana
- Confused cloudywing, Thorybes confusis
- Drusius cloudywing, Thorybes drusius
- Potrillo skipper, Cabares potrillo
- Common scarlet-eye, Nascus phocus
- Fritzgaertner's flat, Celaenorrhinus fritzgaertneri
- Stallings's flat, Celaenorrhinus stallingsi
- Falcate skipper, Spathilepia
- Mimosa skipper, Cogia calchas
- Acacia skipper, Cogia hippalus
- Outis skipper, Cogia outis
- Gold-costa skipper, Cogia caicus
- Starred skipper, Arteurotia tractipennis
- Brown enops, Polyctor enops
- Purplish-black skipper, Nisoniades rubescens
- Glazed pellicia, Pellicia arina
- Morning glory pellicia, Pellicia dimidiata
- White-haired skipper, Noctuana lactifera bipuncta
- Mottled bolla, Bolla clytius
- Rounded bolla, Bolla imbras
- Obscure bolla, Bolla brennus
- Mauve bolla, Bolla eusebius
- Golden-headed scallopwing, Staphylus ceos
- Mazans scallopwing, Staphylus mazans
- Hayhurst's scallopwing, Staphylus hayhurstii
- Aztec scallopwing, Staphylus azteca
- Variegated skipper, Gorgythion begga
- Blue-studded skipper, Sostrata bifasciata
- Dingy mylon, Mylon pelopidas
- Hoary skipper, Carrhenes canescens
- Black-spotted hoary-skipper, Carrhenes fuscescens
- Northern clipper, Milanion clito
- Glassy-winged skipper, Xenophanes tryxus
- Dusted spurwing, Antigonus erosus
- White spurwing, Antigonus emorsus
- Red-studded skipper, Noctuana stator
- Texas powdered-skipper, Systasea pulverulenta
- Arizona powdered-skipper, Systasea zampa
- Sickle-winged skipper, Achylodes thraso
- Pale sicklewing, Achlyodes pallida
- Hermit skipper, Grais stigmatica
- Brown-banded skipper, Timochares ruptifasciatus
- Common bluevent, Anastrus sempiternus
- Common bentwing, Ebrietas anacreon
- White-patched skipper, Chiomara asychis
- False duskywing, Gesta gesta
- Afranius duskywing, Erynnis afranius
- Wild indigo duskywing, Erynnis baptisiae
- Sleepy duskywing, Erynnis brizo
- Florida duskywing, Erynnis brunneus
- Funereal duskywing, Erynnis funeralis
- Horace's duskywing, Erynnis horatius
- Dreamy duskywing, Erynnis icelus
- Juvenal's duskywing, Erynnis juvenalis
  - Arizona Juvenal's duskywing, Erynnis juvenalis clitus
- Columbine duskywing, Erynnis lucilius
- Mottled duskywing, Erynnis martialis
- Meridian duskywing, Erynnis meridianus
- Pacuvius duskywing, Erynnis pacuvius
- Persius duskywing, Erynnis persius
- Propertius duskywing, Erynnis propertius
- Scudder's duskywing, Erynnis scudderi
- Rocky Mountain duskywing, Erynnis telemachus
- Mournful duskywing, Erynnis tristis
- Zarucco duskywing, Erynnis zarucco
- White checkered-skipper, Pyrgus albescens
- Grizzled skipper, Pyrgus centaureae
  - Appalachian grizzled skipper, Pyrgus centaureae wyandot
- Common checkered-skipper, Pyrgus communis
- Tropical checkered-skipper, Pyrgus oileus
- Desert checkered-skipper, Pyrgus philetas
- Two-banded checkered-skipper, Pyrgus ruralis
- Small checkered-skipper, Pyrgus scriptura
- Mountain checkered-skipper, Pyrgus xanthus
- Erichson's white-skipper, Heliopetes domicella
- Northern white-skipper, Heliopetes ericetorum
- Laviana white-skipper, Heliopetes laviana
- Turk's-cap white-skipper, Heliopetes macaira
- East-Mexican white-skipper, Heliopetes sublinea
- Veined white-skipper, Heliopetes arsalte
- Common streaky-skipper, Celotes nessus
- Scarce streaky-skipper, Celotes limpia
- Common sootywing, Pholisora catullus
- Mexican sootywing, Pholisora mejicana
- Mojave sootywing, Hesperopsis libya
- Saltbush sootywing, Hesperopsis alpheus
  - Saltbush saltbush sootywing, Hesperopsis alpheus alpheus
  - McNeill's saltbush sootywing, Hesperopsis alpheus gracielae

== Subfamily Heteropterinae: skipperlings ==
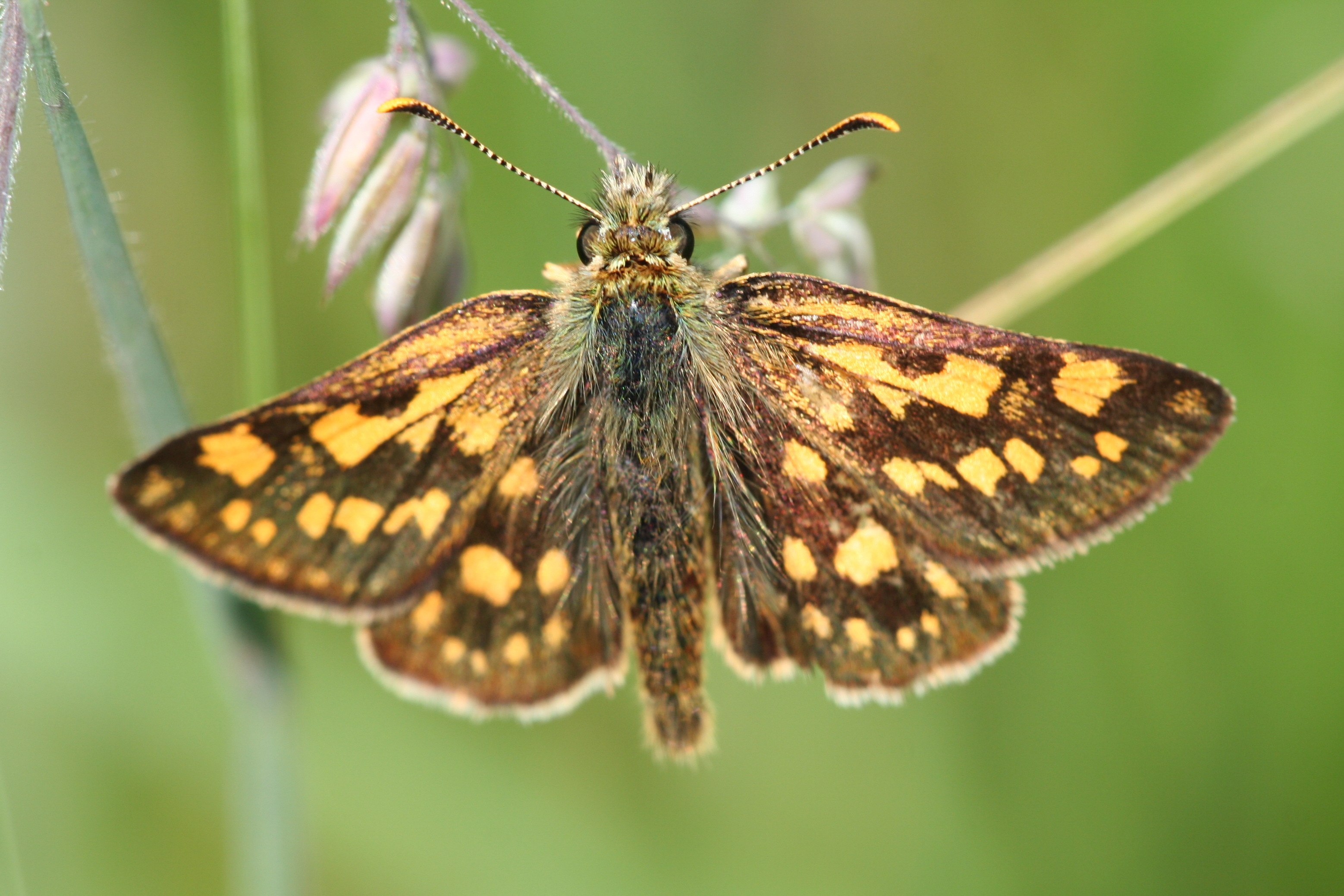
Arctic skipper, Carterocephalus palaemon

- Arctic skipper, Carterocephalus palaemon
- Russet skipperling, Piruna pirus
- Four-spotted skipperling, Piruna polingi
- Many-spotted skipperling, Piruna cingo
- Small-spotted skipperling, Piruna microstictus
- Chisos skipperling, Piruna haferniki
- Two-rayed skipperling, Piruna roeveri

== Subfamily Hesperiinae: grass skippers ==
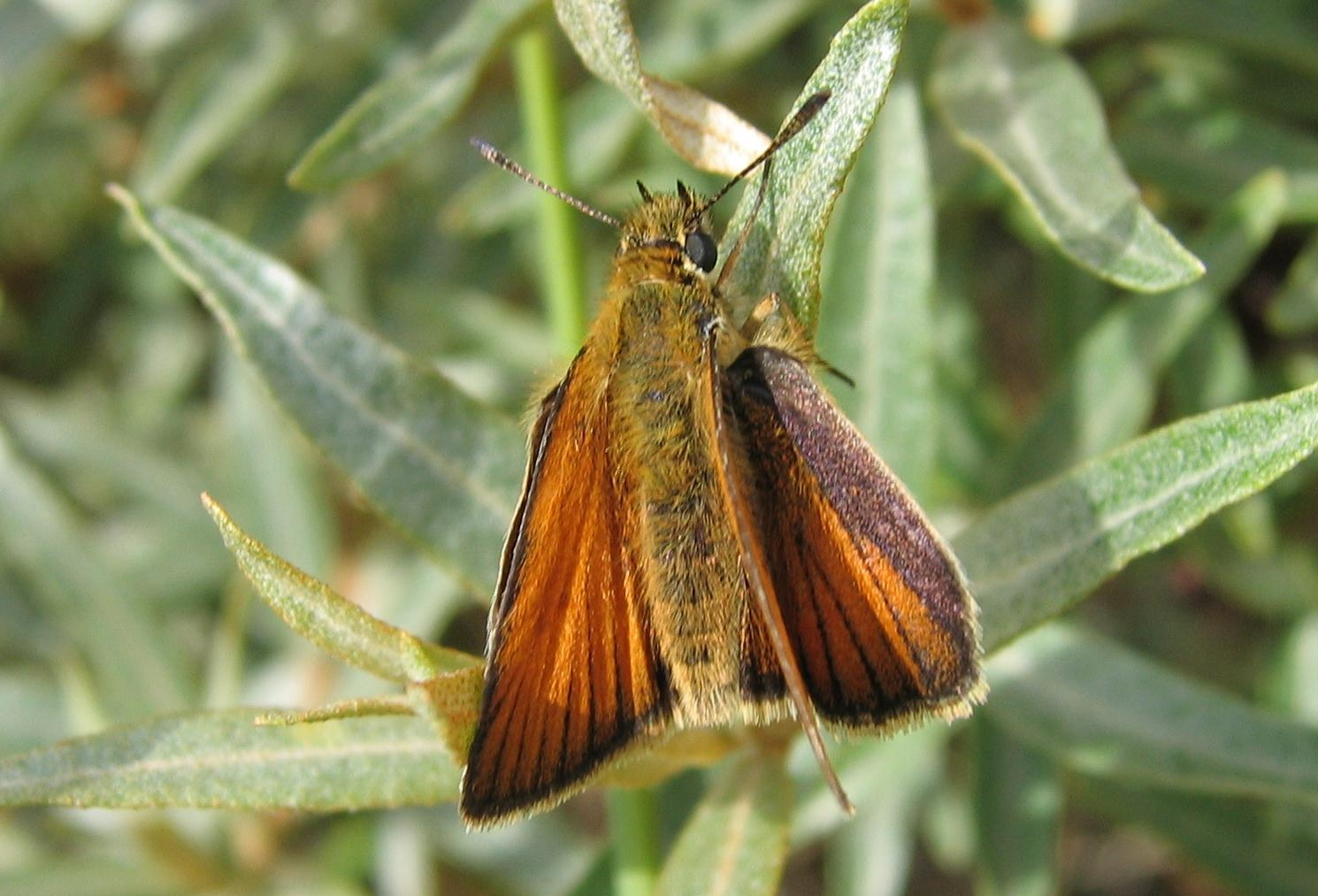
European skipper, Thymelicus lineola

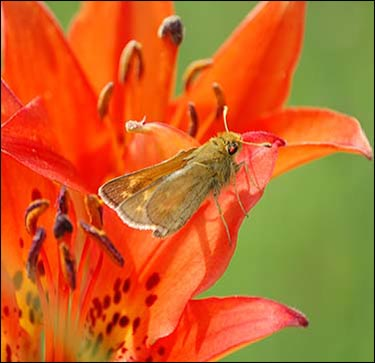
Dakota skipper, Hesperia dacotae

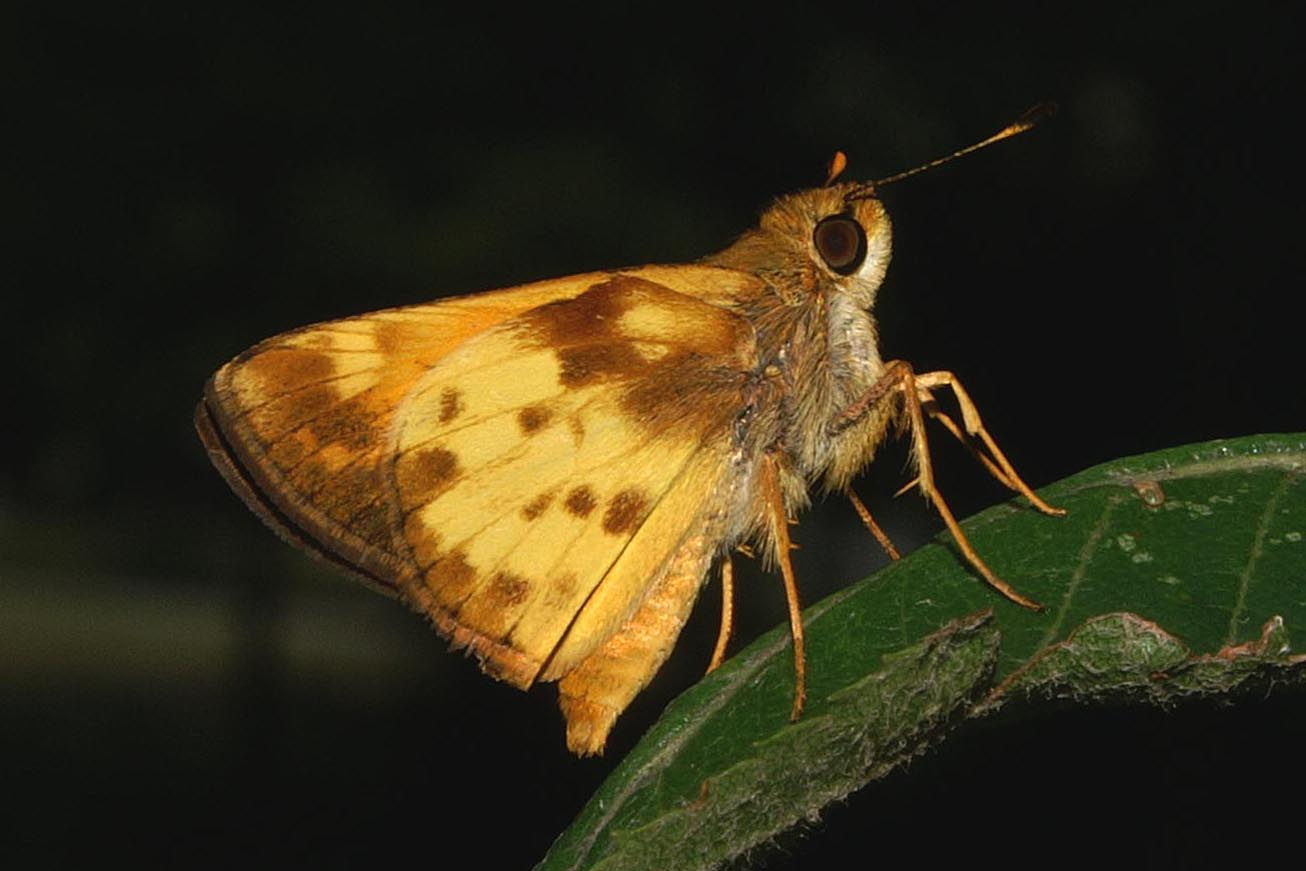
Zabulon skipper, Poanes zabulon

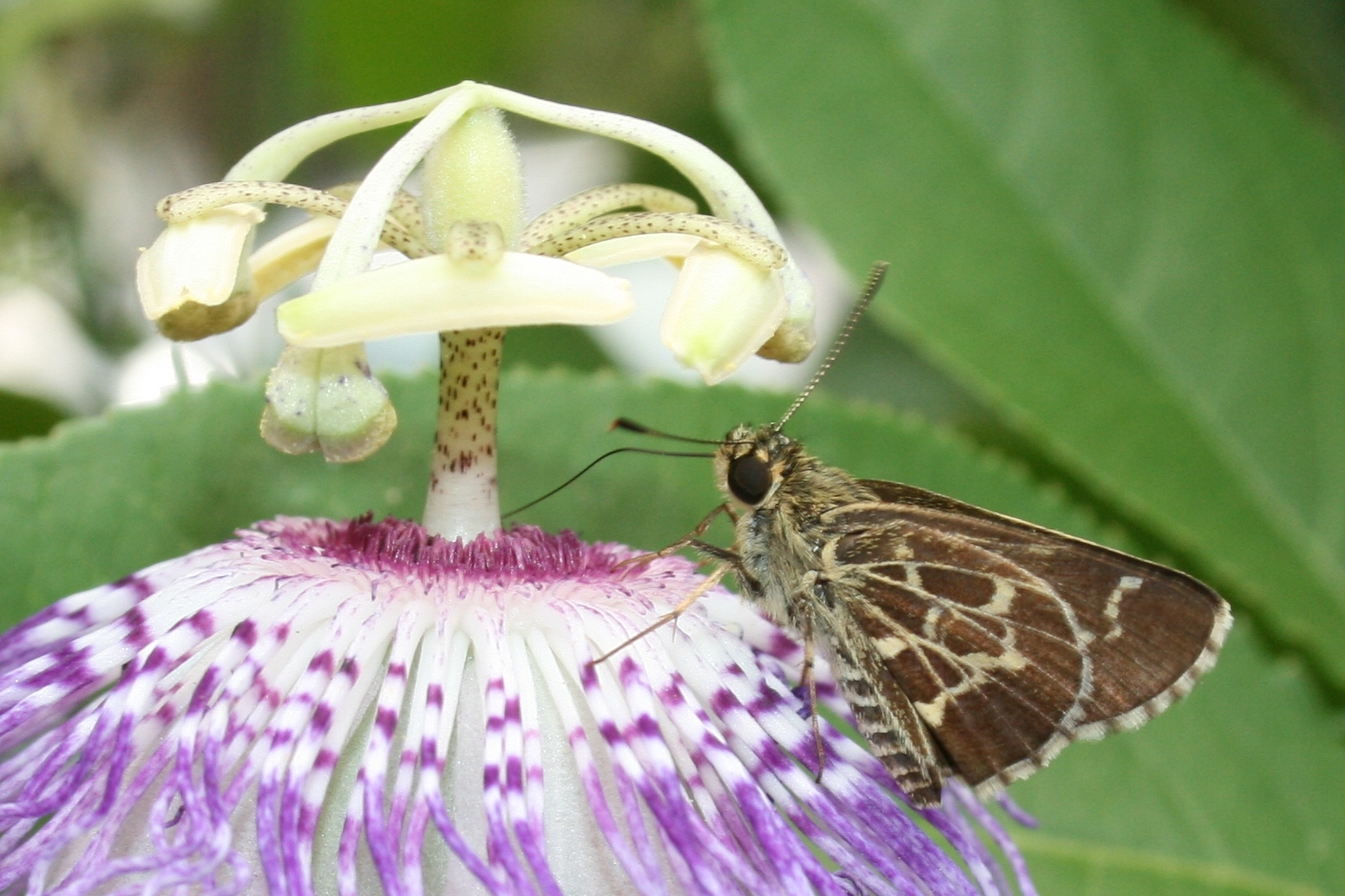
Lace-winged roadside-skipper, Amblyscirtes aesculapius

- Banana skipper, Erionota thrax
- Malicious skipper, Synapte malitiosa
- Salenus skipper, Synapte salenus
- Faceted skipper, Synapte syraces
- Redundant skipper, Corticea corticea
- Pale-rayed skipper, Vidius perigenes
- Violet-patched skipper, Monca tyrtaeus
- Swarthy skipper, Nastra lherminier
- Julia's skipper, Nastra julia
- Neamathla skipper, Nastra neamathla
- Three-spotted skipper, Cymaenes tripunctus
- Fawn-spotted skipper, Cymaenes odilia
- Inca brown-skipper, Vehilius inca
- Pasture brown-skipper, Vehilius stictomenes
- Whitened remella, Remella remus
- Clouded skipper, Lerema accius
- Liris skipper, Lerema liris
- Fantastic skipper, Vettius fantasos
- Green-backed ruby-eye, Perichares philetes
- Osca skipper, Rhinthon osca
- Double-dotted skipper, Decinea percosius
- Hidden-ray skipper, Conga chydaea
- Least skipper, Ancyloxypha numitor
- Tropical least skipper, Ancyloxypha arene
- Poweshiek skipperling, Oarisma poweshiek
- Garita skipperling, Oarisma garita
- Edwards' skipperling, Oarisma edwardsii
- Orange skipperling, Copaeodes aurantiacus
- Southern skipperling, Copaeodes minimus
- Sunrise skipper, Adopaeoides prittwitzi
- European skipper, Thymelicus lineola
- Fiery skipper, Hylephila phyleus
- Alkali skipper, Pseudocopaeodes eunus
- Morrison's skipper, Stinga morrisoni
- Uncas skipper, Hesperia uncas
- Juba skipper, Hesperia juba
- Common branded skipper, Hesperia comma
  - Hesperia comma colorado
  - Hesperia comma assiniboia
- Apache skipper, Hesperia woodgatei
- Ottoe skipper, Hesperia ottoe
- Leonard's skipper, Hesperia leonardus
- Pahaska skipper, Hesperia pahaska
- Columbian skipper, Hesperia columbia
- Cobweb skipper, Hesperia metea
- Green skipper, Hesperia viridis
- Dotted skipper, Hesperia attalus
- Meske's skipper, Hesperia meskei
- Dakota skipper, Hesperia dacotae
- Lindsey's skipper, Hesperia lindseyi
- Indian skipper, Hesperia sassacus
- Sierra skipper, Hesperia miriamae
- Nevada skipper, Hesperia nevada
- Rhesus skipper, Polites rhesus
- Carus skipper, Polites carus
- Peck's skipper, Polites peckius
- Sandhill skipper, Polites sabuleti
- Mardon skipper, Polites mardon
- Draco skipper, Polites draco
- Baracoa skipper, Polites baracoa
- Tawny-edged skipper, Polites themistocles
- Crossline skipper, Polites origenes
- Long dash, Polites mystic
- Sonoran skipper, Polites sonora
- Whirlabout, Polites vibex
- Southern broken-dash, Wallengrenia otho
- Northern broken-dash, Wallengrenia egeremet
- Common glassywing, Pompeius pompeius
- Little glassywing, Pompeius verna
- Sachem, Atalopedes campestris
- Arogos skipper, Atrytone arogos
- Delaware skipper, Anatrytone logan
- Glowing skipper, Anatrytone mazai
- Byssus skipper, Problema byssus
- Rare skipper, Problema bulenta
- Woodland skipper, Ochlodes sylvanoides
- Rural skipper, Ochlodes agricola
- Yuma skipper, Ochlodes yuma
- Snow's skipper, Paratrytone snowi
- Spiked poan, Paratrytone rhexenor
- Mulberry wing, Poanes massasoit
- Hobomok skipper, Poanes hobomok
- Zabulon skipper, Poanes zabulon
- Taxiles skipper, Poanes taxiles
- Aaron's skipper, Poanes aaroni
- Yehl skipper, Poanes yehl
- Broad-winged skipper, Poanes viator
- Umber skipper, Poanes melane
- Common mellana, Quasimellana eulogius
- Palmetto skipper, Euphyes arpa
- Palatka skipper, Euphyes pilatka
- Dion skipper, Euphyes dion
- Bay skipper, Euphyes bayensis
- Dukes' skipper, Euphyes dukesi
- Black dash, Euphyes conspicua
- Berry's skipper, Euphyes berryi
- Two-spotted skipper, Euphyes bimacula
- Dun skipper, Euphyes vestris
- Monk skipper, Asbolis capucinus
- Dusted skipper, Atrytonopsis hianna
  - Atrytonopsis hianna loammi
- Deva skipper, Atrytonopsis deva
- Moon-marked skipper, Atrytonopsis lunus
- Viereck's skipper, Atrytonopsis vierecki
- White-barred skipper, Atrytonopsis pittacus
- Python skipper, Atrytonopsis python
- Cestus skipper, Atrytonopsis cestus
- Sheep skipper, Atrytonopsis edwardsii
- Simius roadside-skipper, Amblyscirtes simius
- Large roadside-skipper, Amblyscirtes exoteria
- Cassus roadside-skipper, Amblyscirtes cassus
- Bronze roadside-skipper, Amblyscirtes aenus
- Linda's roadside-skipper, Amblyscirtes linda
- Oslar's roadside-skipper, Amblyscirtes oslari
- Pepper and salt skipper, Amblyscirtes hegon
- Elissa roadside-skipper, Amblyscirtes elissa
- Texas roadside-skipper, Amblyscirtes texanae
- Toltec roadside-skipper, Amblyscirtes tolteca
  - Prenda Toltec roadside-skipper, Amblyscirtes tolteca prenda
- Lace-winged roadside-skipper, Amblyscirtes aesculapius
- Carolina roadside-skipper, Amblyscirtes carolina
- Reversed roadside-skipper, Amblyscirtes reversa
- Slaty roadside-skipper, Amblyscirtes nereus
- Nysa roadside-skipper, Amblyscirtes nysa
- Dotted roadside-skipper, Amblyscirtes eos
- Common roadside-skipper, Amblyscirtes vialis
- Celia's roadside-skipper, Amblyscirtes celia
- Bell's roadside-skipper, Amblyscirtes belli
- Dusky roadside-skipper, Amblyscirtes alternata
- Orange-headed roadside-skipper, Amblyscirtes phylace
- Orange-edged roadside-skipper, Amblyscirtes fimbriata
- Eufala skipper, Lerodea eufala
- Violet-clouded skipper, Lerodea arabus
- Olive-clouded skipper, Lerodea dysaules
- Twin-spot skipper, Oligoria maculata
- Brazilian skipper, Calpodes ethlius
- Salt marsh skipper, Panoquina panoquin
- Obscure skipper, Panoquina panoquinoides
- Wandering skipper, Panoquina errans
- Ocola skipper, Panoquina ocola
- Hecebolus skipper, Panoquina hecebola
- Purple-washed skipper, Panoquina sylvicola
- Evans' skipper, Panoquina fusina
- Violet-banded skipper, Nyctelius nyctelius
- Common therra, Vacerra bonifilius aeas
- Chestnut-marked skipper, Thespieus macareus

== Subfamily Megathyminae: giant-skippers ==
- Orange giant-skipper, Agathymus neumoegeni (includes chisosensis)
- Arizona giant-skipper, Agathymus aryxna
  - Agathymus aryxna baueri
  - Agathymus aryxna gentryi
- Huachuca giant-skipper, Agathymus evansi
- Mary's giant-skipper, Agathymus mariae
- California giant-skipper, Agathymus stephensi
- Coahuila giant-skipper, Agathymus remingtoni
- Poling's giant-skipper, Agathymus polingi
- Mojave giant-skipper, Agathymus alliae
- Yucca giant-skipper, Megathymus yuccae (includes coloradensis)
- Cofaqui giant-skipper, Megathymus cofaqui (includes harrisi)
- Strecker's giant-skipper, Megathymus streckeri
- Ursine giant-skipper, Megathymus ursus
- Manfreda giant-skipper, Stallingsia maculosa
