= List of butterflies of Oklahoma =

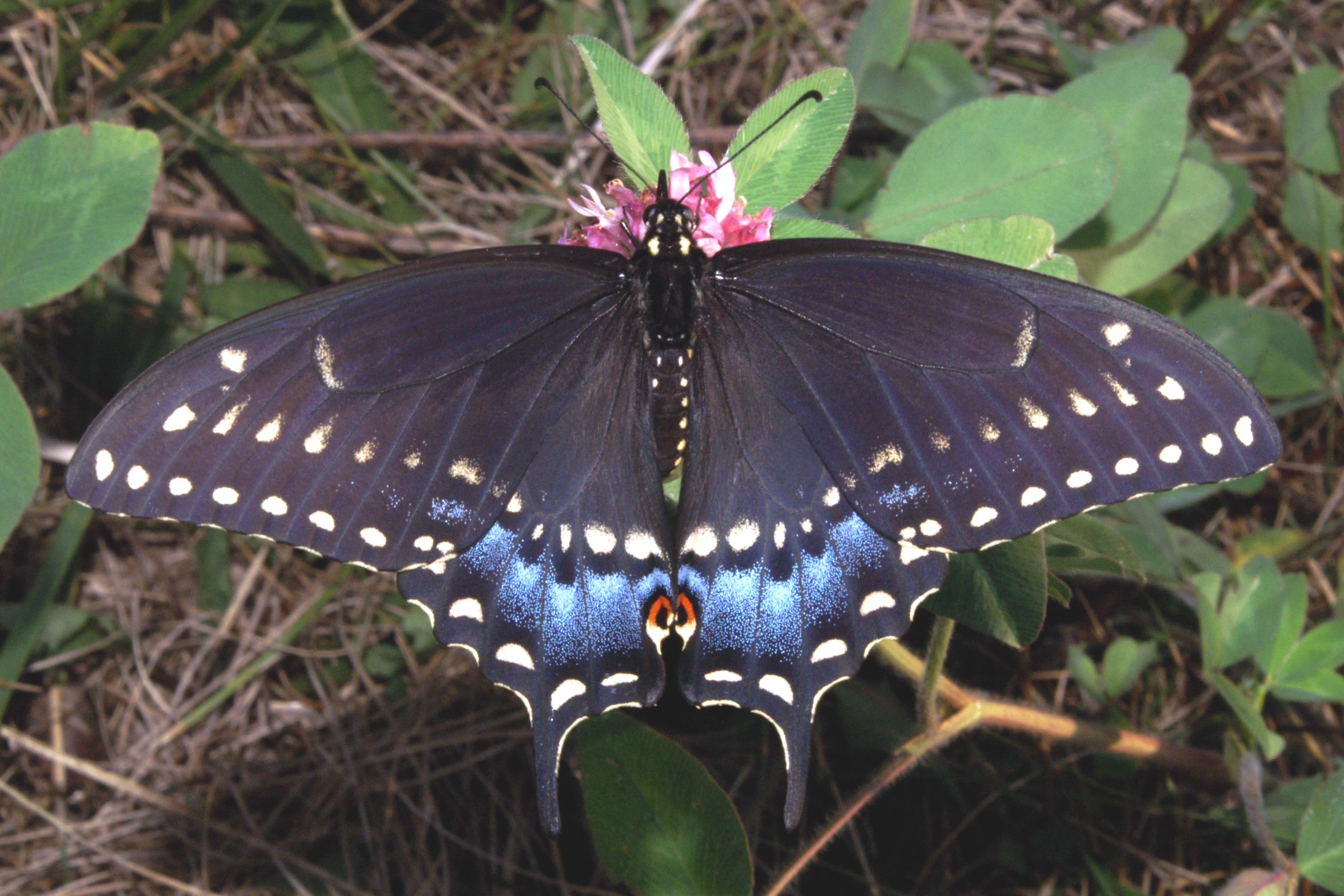
The black swallowtail (Papilio polyxenes) is the state butterfly of Oklahoma

This is a list of all butterflies and skippers found in the state of Oklahoma. Butterflies and skippers are a monophyletic group found in the insect order Lepidoptera. (See the difference between a butterfly and a moth.)

== Butterflies ==
Order: Lepidoptera Superfamily: Papilionoidea

=== Swallowtails ===
Family: Papilionidae

==== Swallowtails: Papilioninae ====
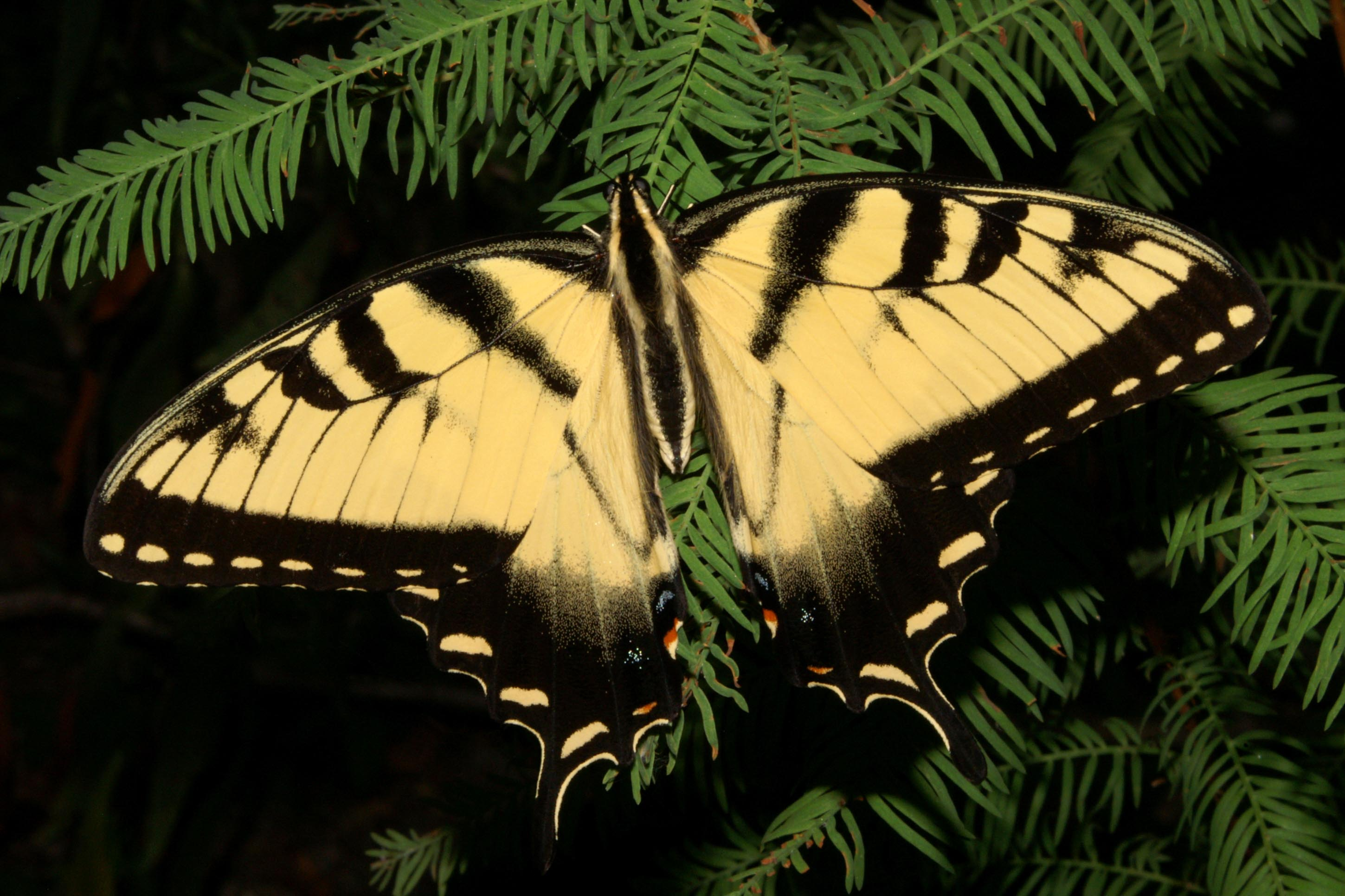
Eastern tiger swallowtail (Papilio glaucus)

Subfamily: Papilioninae

- Pipevine swallowtail (Battus philenor)
- Zebra swallowtail (Eurytides marcellus)
- Black swallowtail (Papilio polyxenes)
- Thoas swallowtail (Papilio thoas)
- Giant swallowtail (Papilio cresphontes)
- Eastern tiger swallowtail (Papilio glaucus)
- Two-tailed swallowtail (Papilio multicaudata)
- Spicebush swallowtail (Papilio troilus)
- Palamedes swallowtail (Papilio palamedes)

=== Whites and sulphers ===
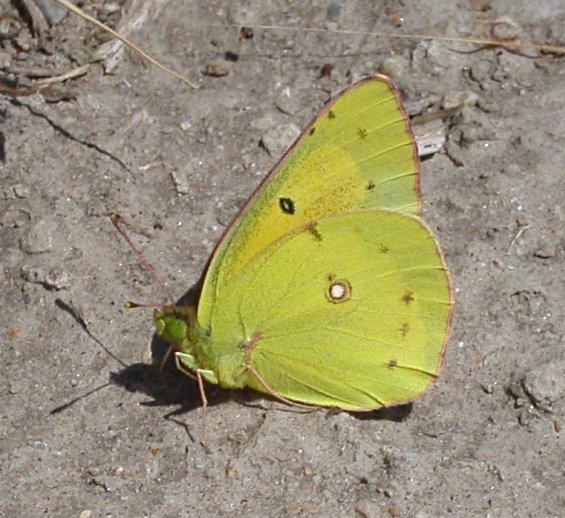
Orange sulphur (Colias eurytheme)

Family: Pieridae

==== Whites ====
Subfamily: Pierinae

- Florida white (Appias drusilla)
- Becker's white (Pontia beckerii)
- Spring white (Pontia sisymbrii)
- Checkered white (Pontia protodice)
- Cabbage white (Pieris rapae)
- Large marble (Euchloe ausonides)
- Olympia marble (Euchloe olympia)
- Falcate orangetip (Anthocharis midea)

==== Sulphurs ====
Subfamily: Coliadinae

- Clouded sulphur (Colias philodice)
- Orange sulphur (Colias eurytheme)
- Southern dogface (Zerene cesonia)
- White angled-sulphur (Anteos clorinde)
- Cloudless sulphur (Phoebis sennae)
- Orange-barred sulphur (Phoebis philea)
- Large orange sulphur (Phoebis agarithe)
- Lyside sulphur (Kricogonia lyside)
- Barred yellow (Eurema daira)
- Mexican yellow (Eurema mexicana)
- Little yellow (Eurema lisa)
- Sleepy orange (Eurema nicippe)
- Dainty sulphur (Nathalis iole)

=== Gossamer-wing butterflies ===
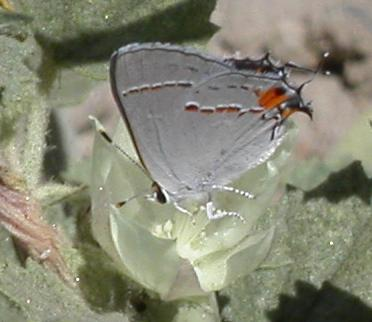
Gray hairstreak (Strymon melinus)

Family: Lycaenidae

==== Harvester ====
Subfamily: Miletinae

- Harvester (Feniseca tarquinius)

==== Coppers ====
Subfamily: Lycaeninae

- American copper (Lycaena phlaeas)
- Gray copper (Lycaena dione)
- Bronze copper (Lycaena hyllus)
- Purplish copper (Lycaena helloides)

==== Hairstreaks ====
Subfamily: Theclinae

- Great purple hairstreak (Atlides halesus)
- Soapberry hairstreak (Phaeostrymon alcestis)
- Coral hairstreak (Satyrium titus)
- Behr's hairstreak (Satyrium behrii)
- Edwards' hairstreak (Satyrium edwardsii)
- Banded hairstreak (Satyrium calanus)
- Striped hairstreak (Satyrium liparops)
- Southern hairstreak (Fixsenia favonius)
- Frosted elfin (Callophrys irus)
- Henry's elfin (Callophrys henrici)
- Eastern pine elfin (Callophrys niphon)
- Thicket hairstreak (Callophrys spinetorum)
- Juniper hairstreak (Callophrys gryneus)
- White M hairstreak (Parrhasius m-album)
- Gray hairstreak (Strymon melinus)
- Red-banded hairstreak (Calycopis cecrops)

==== Blues ====
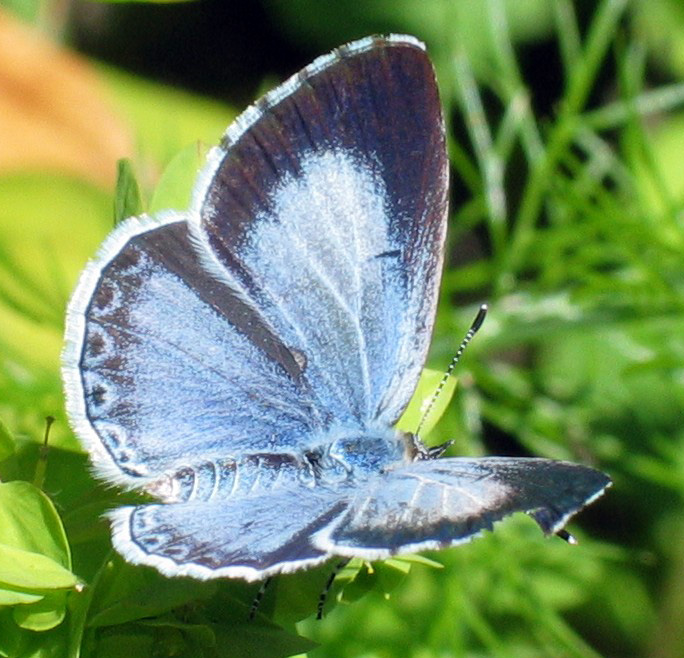
Spring azure (Celastrina ladon)

Subfamily: Polyommatinae

- Western pygmy-blue (Brephidium exile)
- Cassius blue (Leptotes cassius)
- Marine blue (Leptotes marina)
- Reakirt's blue (Echinargus isola)
- Eastern tailed-blue (Cupido comyntas)
- Spring azure (Celastrina ladon)
- Summer azure (Celastrina neglecta)
- Silvery blue (Glaucopsyche lygdamus)
- Melissa blue (Plebejus melissa)
- Lupine blue (Icaricia lupini)

=== Metalmarks ===
Family: Riodinidae

- Little metalmark (Calephelis virginiensis)
- Northern metalmark (Calephelis borealis)

=== Brush-footed butterflies ===
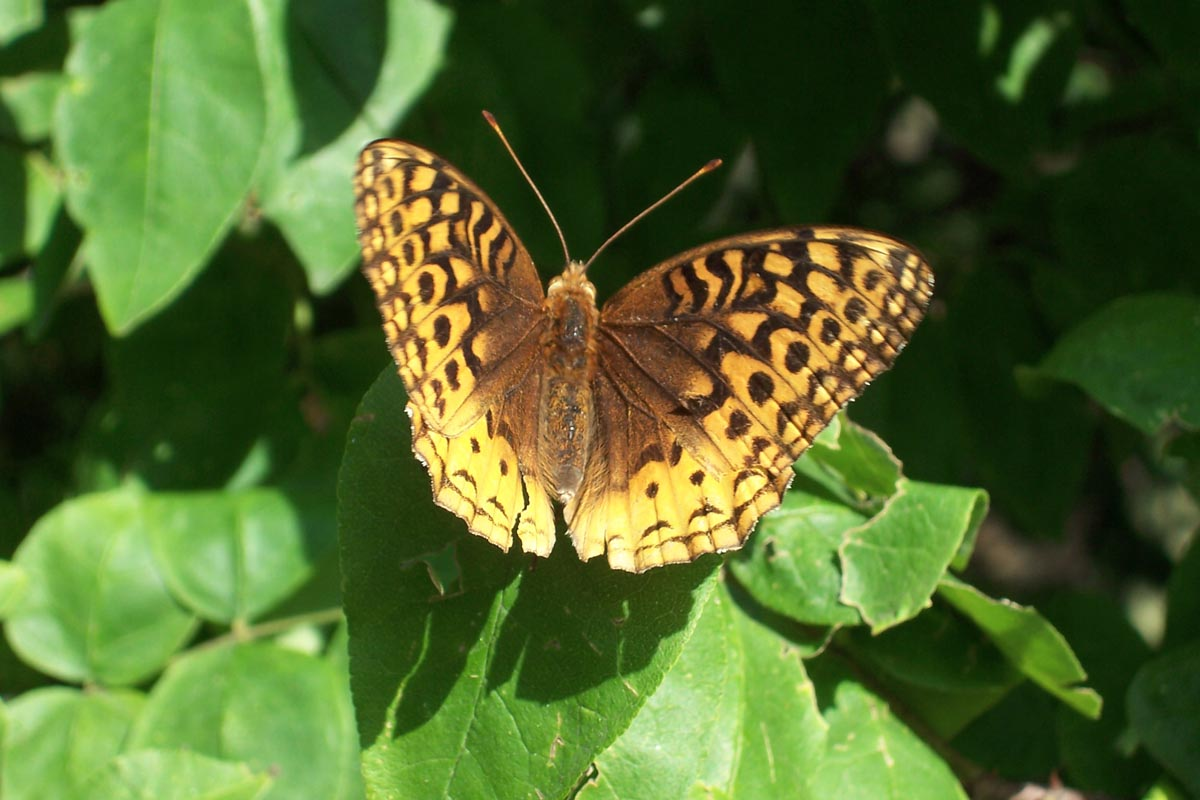
Great spangled fritillary (Speyeria cybele)

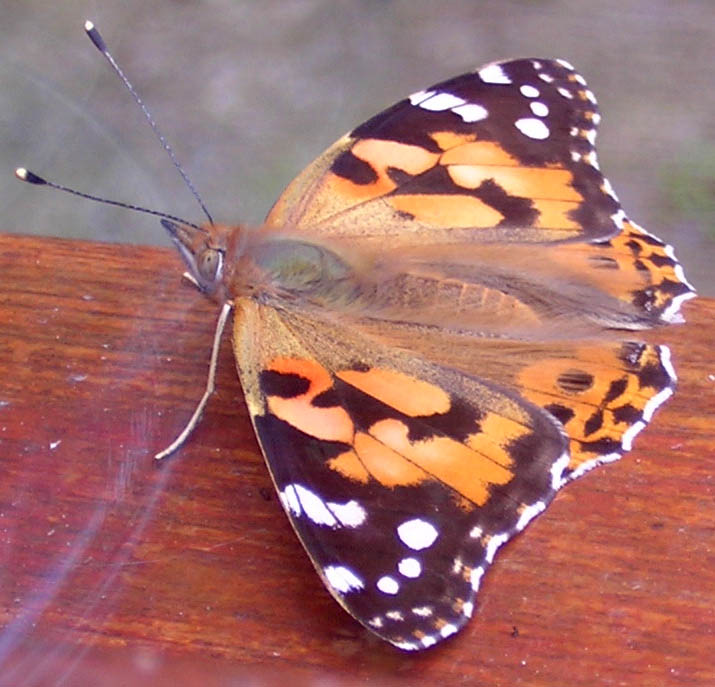
Painted lady (Vanessa cardui)

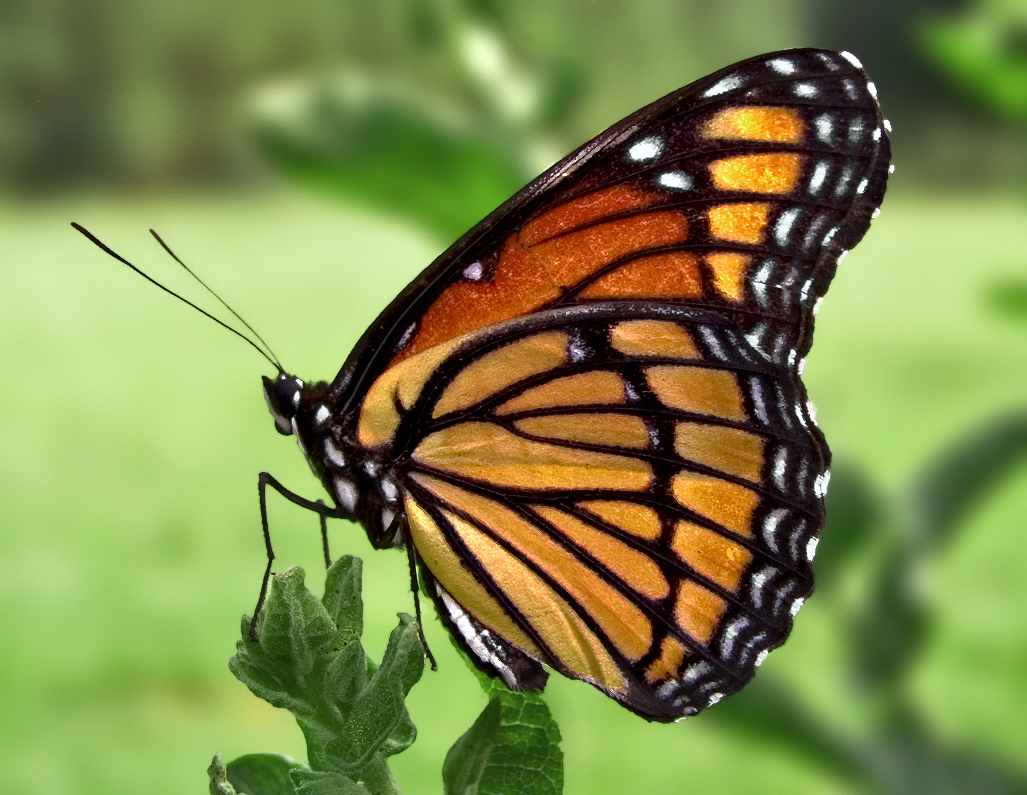
Viceroy (Limenitis archippus)

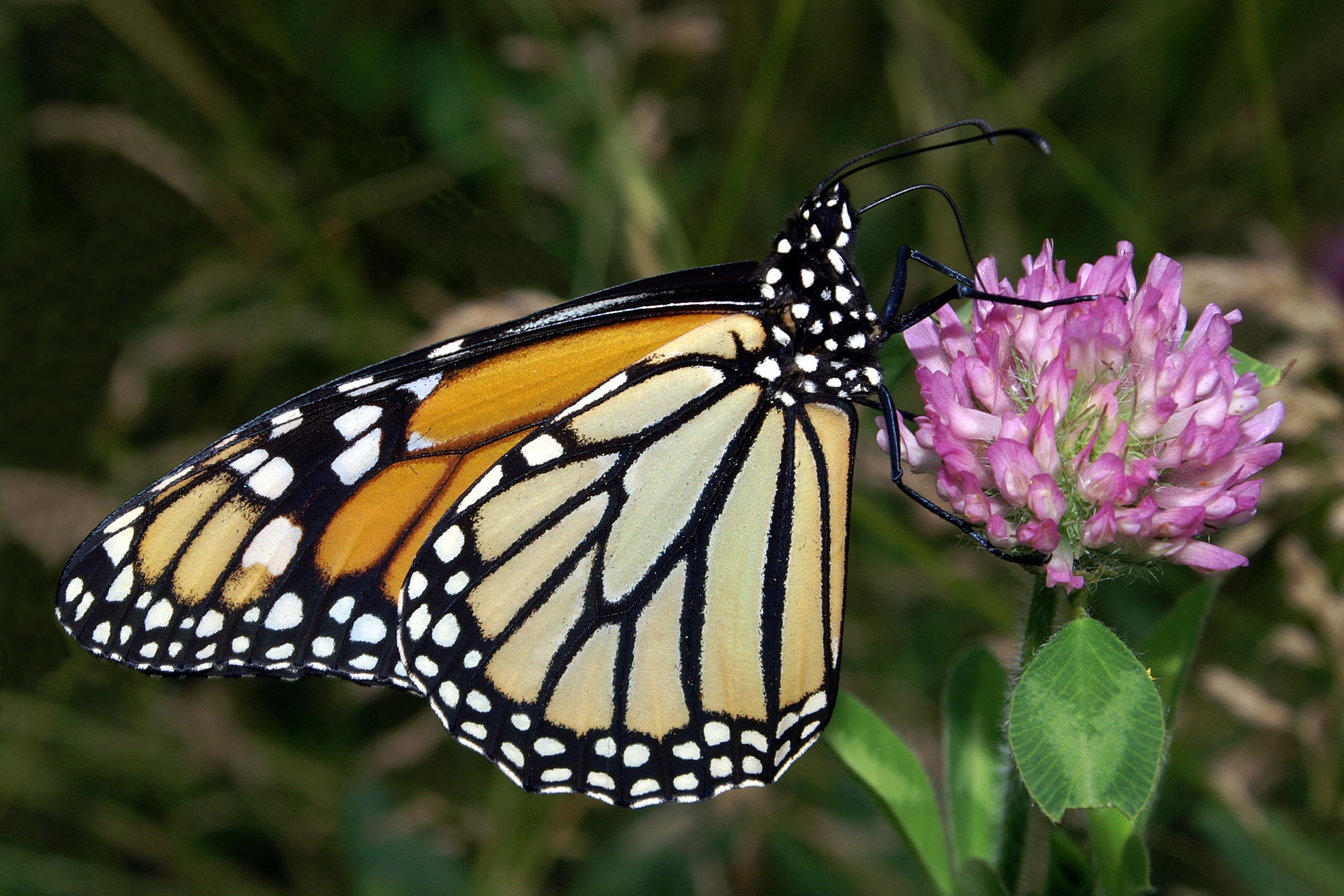
Monarch (Danaus plexippus)

Family: Nymphalidae

==== Snouts ====
Subfamily: Libytheinae

- American snout (Libytheana carinenta)

==== Heliconians and fritillaries ====
Subfamily: Heliconiinae

- Gulf fritillary (Agraulis vanillae)
- Zebra heliconian (Heliconius charithonia)
- Variegated fritillary (Euptoieta claudia)
- Diana (Speyeria diana)
- Great spangled fritillary (Speyeria cybele)
- Regal fritillary (Speyeria idalia)
- Edwards' fritillary (Speyeria edwardsii)

==== True brush-foots ====
Subfamily: Nymphalinae

- Dotted checkerspot (Poladryas minuta)
- Fulvia checkerspot (Thessalia fulvia)
- Bordered patch (Chlosyne lacinia)
- Gorgone checkerspot (Chlosyne gorgone)
- Silvery checkerspot (Chlosyne nycteis)
- Texan crescent (Phyciodes texana)
- Graphic crescent (Phyciodes graphica)
- Phaon crescent (Phyciodes phaon)
- Pearl crescent (Phyciodes tharos)
- Field crescent (Phyciodes pratensis)
- Painted crescent (Phyciodes picta)
- Variable checkerspot (Euphydryas chalcedona)
- Baltimore (Euphydryas phaeton)
- Question mark (Polygonia interrogationis)
- Eastern comma (Polygonia comma)
- Gray comma (Polygonia progne)
- Mourning cloak (Nymphalis antiopa)
- American lady (Vanessa virginiensis)
- Painted lady (Vanessa cardui)
- West Coast lady (Vanessa annabella)
- Red admiral (Vanessa atalanta)
- Common buckeye (Junonia coenia)

==== Admirals and relatives ====
Subfamily: Limenitidinae

- Red-spotted purple (Limenitis arthemis)
  - 'Astyanax' red-spotted purple (Limenitis arthemis astyanax)
- Viceroy (Limenitis archippus)
- Weidemeyer's admiral (Limenitis weidemeyerii)
- California sister (Adelpha bredowii)
- Common mestra (Mestra amymone)

==== Leafwings ====
Subfamily: Charaxinae

- Goatweed leafwing (Anaea andria)

==== Emperors ====
Subfamily: Apaturinae

- Hackberry emperor (Asterocampa celtis)
- Tawny emperor (Asterocampa clyton)

==== Satyrs ====
Subfamily: Satyrinae

- Southern pearly eye (Enodia portlandia)
- Northern pearly eye (Enodia anthedon)
- Creole pearly eye (Enodia creola)
- Canyonland satyr (Cyllopsis pertepida)
- Gemmed satyr (Cyllopsis gemma)
- Carolina satyr (Hermeuptychia sosybius)
- Georgia satyr (Neonympha areolata)
- Little wood satyr (Megisto cymela)
- Red satyr (Megisto rubricata)
- Common wood-nymph (Cercyonis pegala)
- Ridings' satyr (Neominois ridingsii)

==== Monarchs ====
Subfamily: Danainae

- Monarch (Danaus plexippus)
- Queen (Danaus gilippus)

== Skippers ==
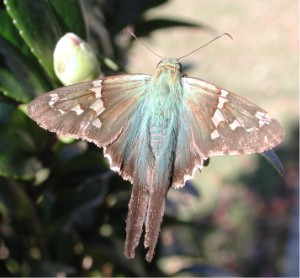
Long-tailed skipper (Urbanus proteus)

Order: Lepidoptera Family: Hesperiidae

=== Spread-wing skippers ===
Subfamily: Pyrginae

- Silver-spotted skipper (Epargyreus clarus)
- Long-tailed skipper (Urbanus proteus)
- Golden banded-skipper (Autochton cellus)
- Hoary edge (Achalarus lyciades)
- Southern cloudywing (Thorybes bathyllus)
- Northern cloudywing (Thorybes pylades)
- Confusing cloudywing (Thorybes confusis)
- Outis skipper (Cogia outis)
- Hayhurst's scallopwing (Staphylus hayhurstii)
- Dreamy duskywing (Erynnis icelus)
- Sleepy duskywing (Erynnis brizo)
- Juvenal's duskywing (Erynnis juvenalis)
- Rocky Mountain duskywing (Erynnis telemachus)
- Horace's duskywing (Erynnis horatius)
- Mottled duskywing (Erynnis martialis)
- Zarucco duskywing (Erynnis zarucco)
- Funereal duskywing (Erynnis funeralis)
- Wild indigo duskywing (Erynnis baptisiae)
- Common checkered-skipper (Pyrgus communis)
- Common streaky-skipper (Celotes nessus)
- Common sootywing (Pholisora catullus)

=== Grass skippers ===
Subfamily: Hesperiinae

- Swarthy skipper (Nastra lherminier)
- Clouded skipper (Lerema accius)
- Least skipper (Ancyloxypha numitor)
- Orange skipperling (Copaeodes aurantiacia)
- Southern skipperling (Copaeodes minima)
- Fiery skipper (Hylephila phyleus)
- Uncas skipper (Hesperia uncas)
- Ottoe skipper (Hesperia ottoe)
- Leonard's skipper (Hesperia leonardus)
- Cobweb skipper (Hesperia metea)
- Green skipper (Hesperia viridis)
- Dotted skipper (Hesperia attalus)
- Peck's skipper (Polites peckius)
- Rhesus skipper (Polites rhesus)
- Carus skipper (Polites carus)
- Tawny-edged skipper (Polites themistocles)
- Crossline skipper (Polites origenes)
- Whirlabout (Polites vibex)
- Southern broken-dash (Wallengrenia otho)
- Northern broken-dash (Wallengrenia egeremet)
- Little glassywing (Pompeius verna)
- Sachem (Atalopedes campestris)
- Arogos skipper (Atrytone arogos)
- Delaware skipper (Anatrytone logan)
- Byssus skipper (Problema byssus)
- Hobomok skipper (Poanes hobomok)
- Zabulon skipper (Poanes zabulon)
- Broad-winged skipper (Poanes viator)
- Dion skipper (Euphyes dion)
- Black dash (Euphyes conspicua)
- Dun skipper (Euphyes vestris)
- Dusted skipper (Atrytonopsis hianna)
- Viereck's skipper (Atrytonopsis vierecki)
- Bronze roadside-skipper (Amblyscirtes aenus)
- Linda's roadside-skipper (Amblyscirtes linda)
- Oslar's roadside-skipper (Amblyscirtes oslari)
- Lace-winged roadside-skipper (Amblyscirtes aesculapius)
- Nysa roadside-skipper (Amblyscirtes nysa)
- Dotted roadside-skipper (Amblyscirtes eos)
- Common roadside-skipper (Amblyscirtes vialis)
- Bell's roadside-skipper (Amblyscirtes belli)
- Dusky roadside-skipper (Amblyscirtes alternata)
- Eufala skipper (Lerodea eufala)
- Brazilian skipper (Calpodes ethlius)
- Ocola skipper (Panoquina ocola)

=== Giant-skippers ===
Subfamily: Megathyminae

- Yucca giant-skipper (Megathymus yuccae)
- Strecker's giant-skipper (Megathymus streckeri)
