= Roadside rambler =

Roadside rambler may refer to:

- Roadside rambler (Amblyscirtes celia), a butterfly of the family Hesperiidae and subfamily Hesperiinae
- Roadside rambler (Pholisora catullus), a butterfly of the family Hesperiidae and subfamily Pyrginae
