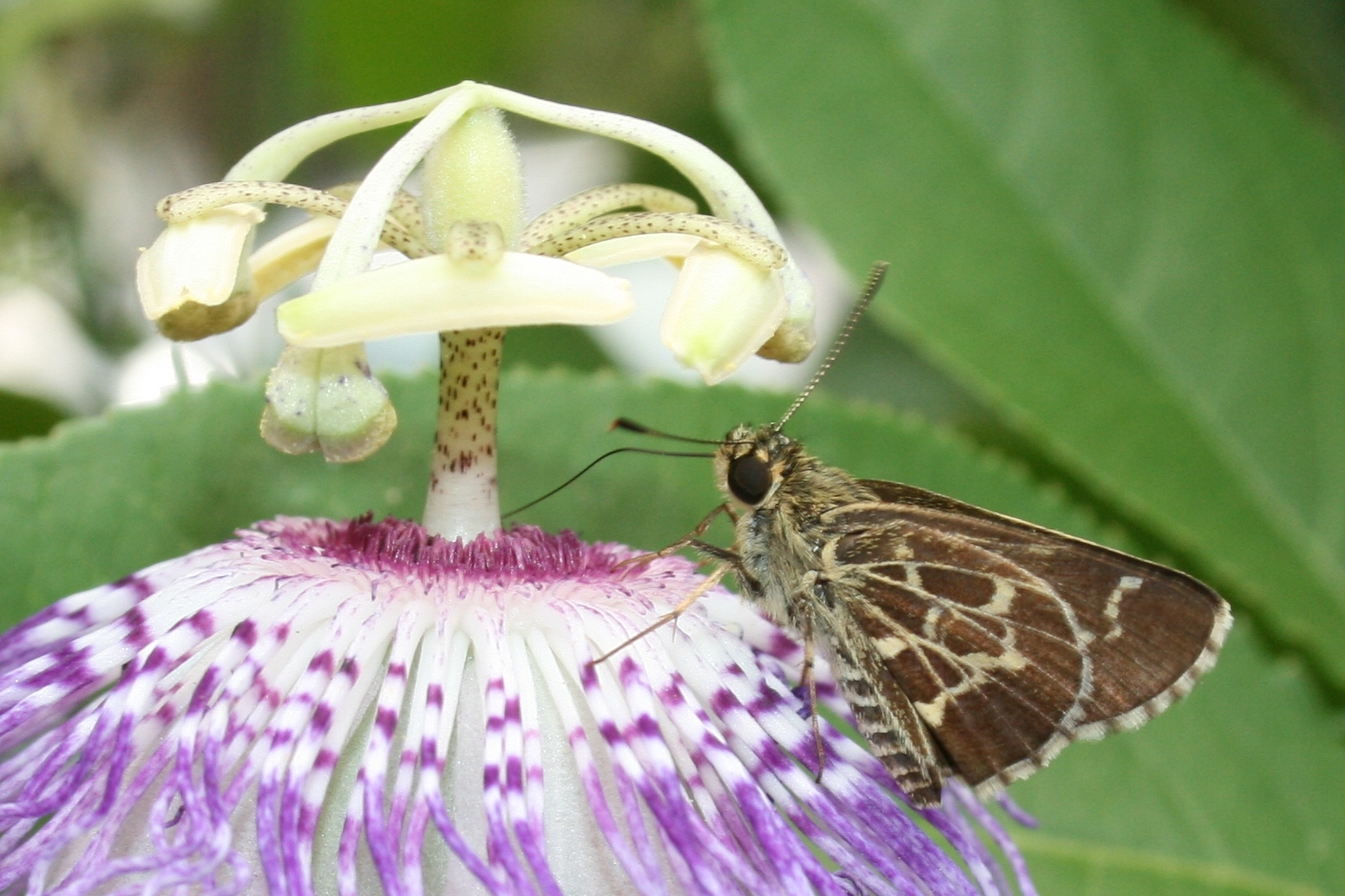
- Amblyscirtes aesculapius

Scientific classification
- Kingdom: Animalia
- Phylum: Arthropoda
- Class: Insecta
- Order: Lepidoptera
- Family: Hesperiidae
- Subtribe: Moncina
- Genus: Amblyscirtes; Scudder, 1872

Synonyms
- Amblyscirtes Scudder, 1872; Stomyles Scudder, 1872; Mastor Godman, [1900]; Epiphyes Dyar, 1905

= Amblyscirtes =

Genus of butterflies

Amblyscirtes is a genus of skipper butterflies in the family Hesperiidae. The genus was erected by Samuel Hubbard Scudder in 1872.

== Species ==
- A. aenus Edwards, 1878
- A. aesculapius Fabricius, 1793
- A. alternata (Grote and Robinson, 1867)
- A. anubis
- A. belli Freeman, 1941
- A. brocki
- A. carolina Skinner, 1892
- A. cassus Edwards, 1883
- A. celia Skinner, 1895
- A. elissa Godman, 1900
- A. eos (Edwards, 1871)
- A. exoteria (Herrich-Schäffer, 1869)
- A. fimbriata Plötz, 1882
- A. florus
- A. fluonia
- A. folia
- A. hegon (Scudder, 1863)
- A. linda Freeman, 1943
- A. nereus Edwards, 1876
- A. novimmaculatus
- A. nysa Edwards, 1877
- A. oslari Skinner, 1899
- A. patriciae
- A. phylace Edwards, 1878
- A. raphaeli
- A. reversa F. M. Jones, 1926
- A. simius Edwards, 1881
- A. texanae Bell, 1927
- A. tolteca Scudder, 1872
- A. vialis (Edwards, 1862)
