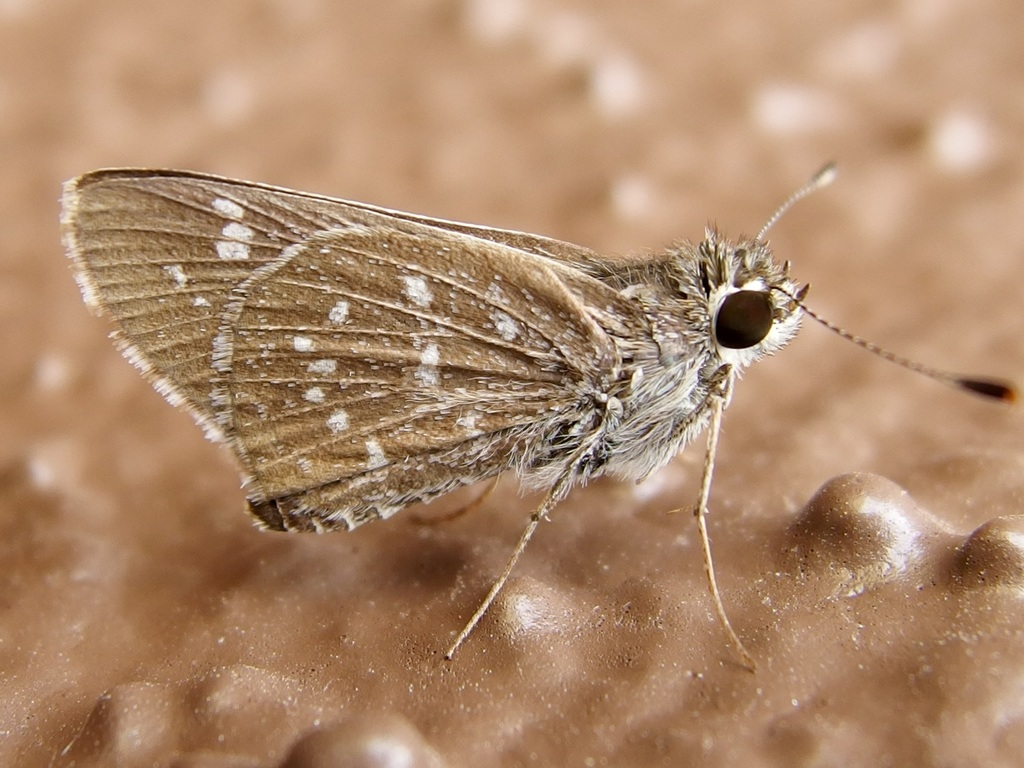

Scientific classification
- Kingdom: Animalia
- Phylum: Arthropoda
- Class: Insecta
- Order: Lepidoptera
- Family: Hesperiidae
- Genus: Amblyscirtes
- Species: A. tolteca

Binomial name
- Amblyscirtes tolteca Scudder, 1872

= Amblyscirtes tolteca =

Species of butterfly

Amblyscirtes tolteca, the toltec roadside skipper, is a species of grass skipper in the butterfly family Hesperiidae. It is found in Central America and North America.

== Subspecies ==
These two subspecies belong to the species Amblyscirtes tolteca:

- Amblyscirtes tolteca prenda Evans, 1955
- Amblyscirtes tolteca tolteca Scudder, 1872
