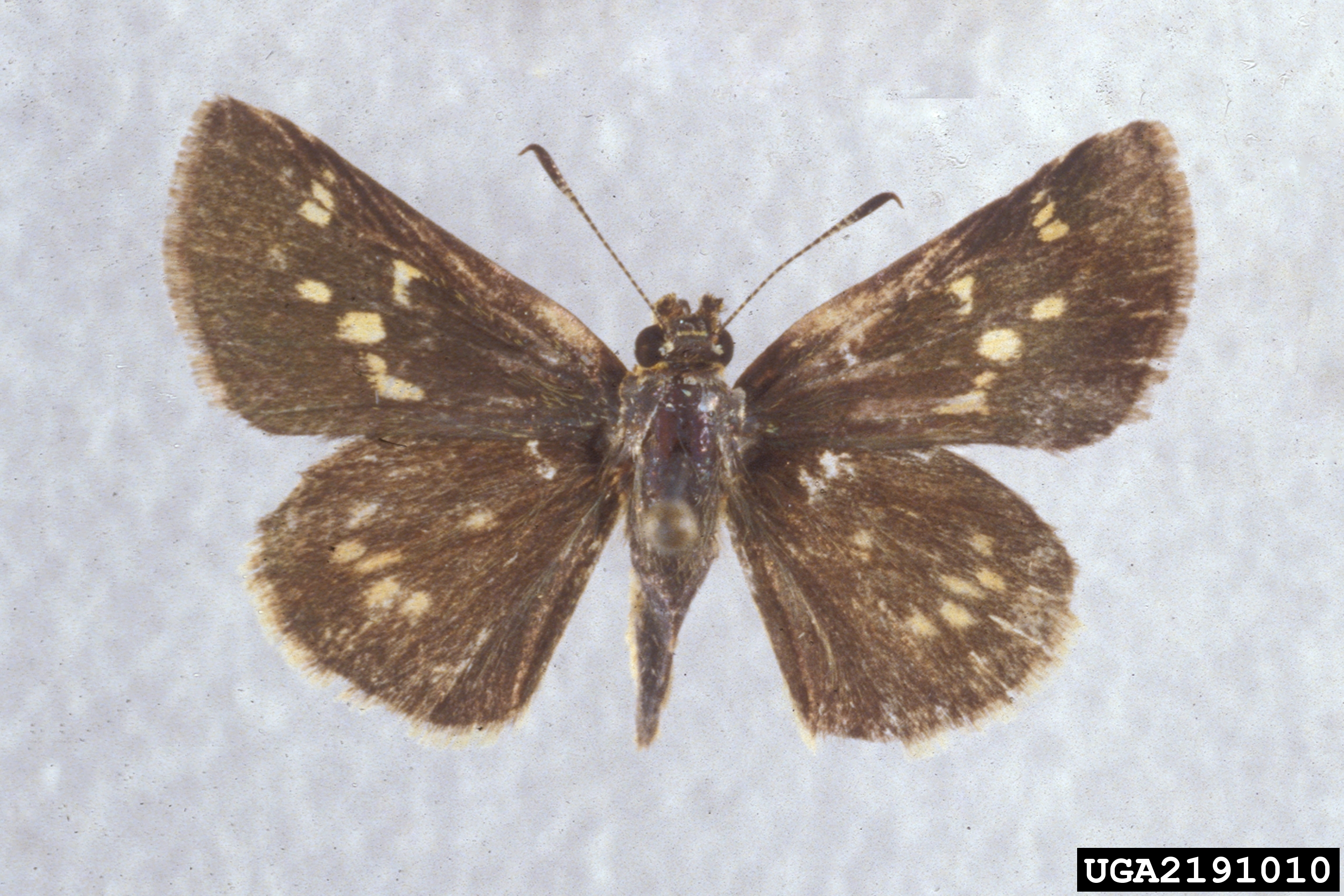

Conservation status
- Vulnerable (NatureServe)

Scientific classification
- Kingdom: Animalia
- Phylum: Arthropoda
- Class: Insecta
- Order: Lepidoptera
- Family: Hesperiidae
- Genus: Amblyscirtes
- Species: A. carolina

Binomial name
- Amblyscirtes carolina (Skinner, 1892)

Synonyms
- Pamphila carolina Skinner, 1892

= Amblyscirtes carolina =

Species of butterfly

Amblyscirtes carolina, the Carolina roadside skipper, is a species of butterfly in the family Hesperiidae. It is found from south-eastern Virginia, south to South Carolina, west to northern Mississippi. There are disjunct populations in Delaware, southern Illinois and northwest Arkansas.

The wingspan is 29–37 mm. Adults are on wing from April to September. There are three generations per year.

The larvae probably feed on Arundinaria tecta. Adults feed on flower nectar of sweet pepperbush, swamp milkweed, cinquefoil, wild strawberry, blackberry and ironweed.
