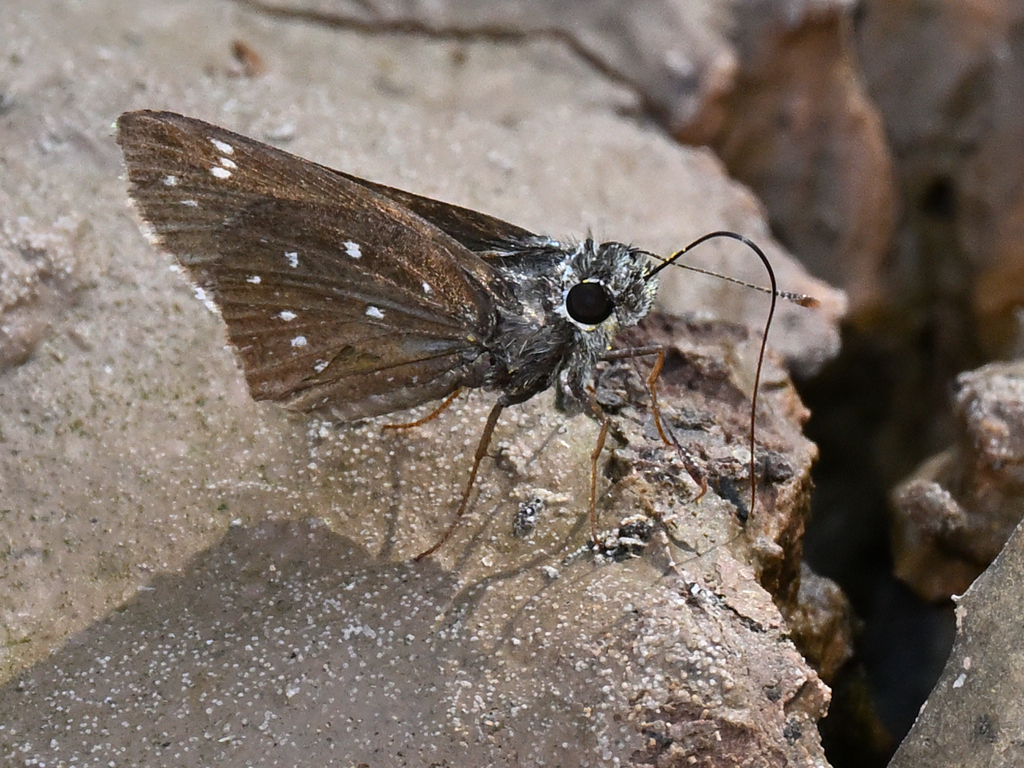

Conservation status
- Apparently Secure (NatureServe)

Scientific classification
- Kingdom: Animalia
- Phylum: Arthropoda
- Class: Insecta
- Order: Lepidoptera
- Family: Hesperiidae
- Genus: Amblyscirtes
- Species: A. exoteria

Binomial name
- Amblyscirtes exoteria (Herrich-Schäffer, 1869)

Synonyms
- Amblyscirtes nanno W. H. Edwards, 1882; Chapra marcus Strand, 1909

= Amblyscirtes exoteria =

Species of butterfly

Amblyscirtes exoteria, the large roadside skipper, is a species of grass skipper in the butterfly family Hesperiidae.
