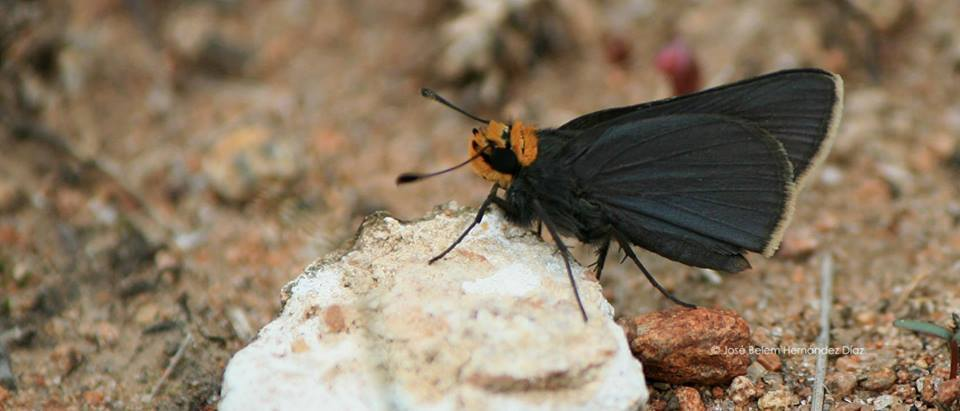

Scientific classification
- Kingdom: Animalia
- Phylum: Arthropoda
- Class: Insecta
- Order: Lepidoptera
- Family: Hesperiidae
- Genus: Amblyscirtes
- Species: A. phylace

Binomial name
- Amblyscirtes phylace (Edwards, 1878)

Synonyms
- Pamphila phylace Edwards, 1878; Limochroes phylace

= Amblyscirtes phylace =

Species of butterfly

Amblyscirtes phylace (the orange-headed roadside-skipper or red-headed roadside skipper) is a species of butterfly of the family Hesperiidae. It is found from Colorado, New Mexico, Arizona and western Texas to Mexico.

Its wingspan is 22–29 millimetres (0.87–1.14 in). Adults feed on flower nectar.
