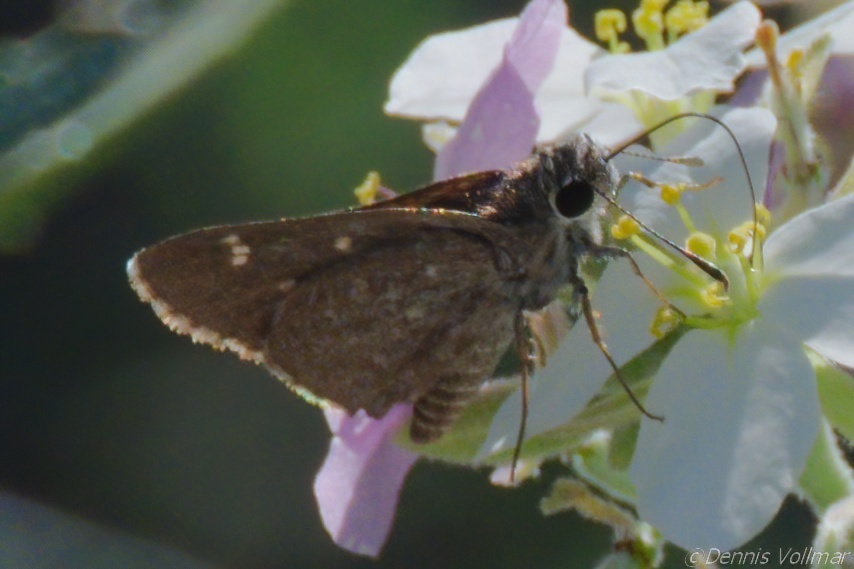

Scientific classification
- Kingdom: Animalia
- Phylum: Arthropoda
- Class: Insecta
- Order: Lepidoptera
- Family: Hesperiidae
- Genus: Amblyscirtes
- Species: A. texanae

Binomial name
- Amblyscirtes texanae E. Bell, 1927

= Amblyscirtes texanae =

Species of butterfly

Amblyscirtes texanae, the Texas roadside skipper, is a species of grass skipper in the butterfly family Hesperiidae. It is found in North America.
