= Amblyscirtes simius =

Conservation status
- Vulnerable (NatureServe)

Scientific classification
- Kingdom: Animalia
- Phylum: Arthropoda
- Class: Insecta
- Order: Lepidoptera
- Family: Hesperiidae
- Genus: Amblyscirtes
- Species: A. simius

Binomial name
- Amblyscirtes simius W.H. Edwards, 1881

Species of butterfly

Amblyscirtes simius, the simius roadside skipper, is a butterfly of the family Hesperiidae. It is found in North America from Texas to North Dakota but has been recorded in southern Saskatchewan.

The wingspan is 21–23 mm. Adults are on wing from April to July. There is one generation per year.

The larvae feed on blue grama grass (Bouteloua gracilis). Adults feed on flower nectar, including Penstemon, Cirsium and Verbena.
