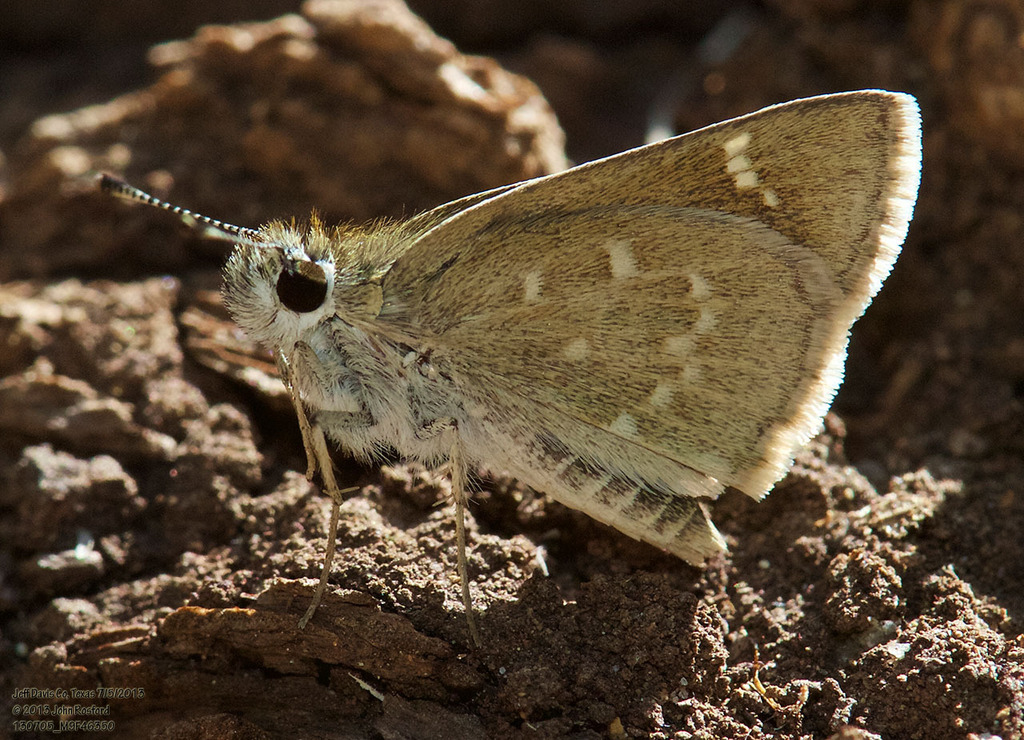

Scientific classification
- Kingdom: Animalia
- Phylum: Arthropoda
- Class: Insecta
- Order: Lepidoptera
- Family: Hesperiidae
- Genus: Amblyscirtes
- Species: A. nereus

Binomial name
- Amblyscirtes nereus (W. H. Edwards, 1876)

= Amblyscirtes nereus =

Species of butterfly

Amblyscirtes nereus, the slaty roadside skipper, is a species of grass skipper in the butterfly family Hesperiidae.
