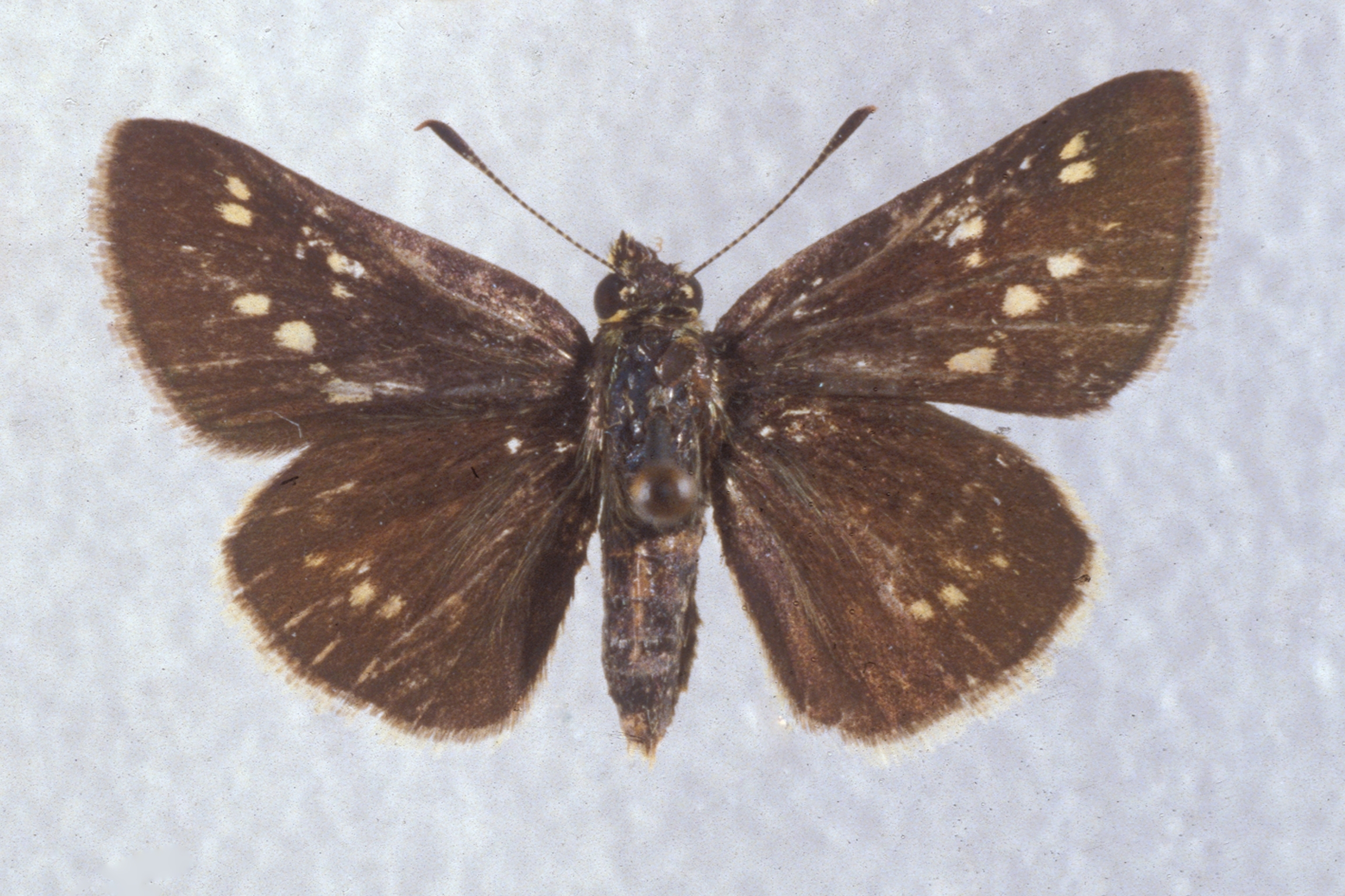

Conservation status
- Vulnerable (NatureServe)

Scientific classification
- Kingdom: Animalia
- Phylum: Arthropoda
- Class: Insecta
- Order: Lepidoptera
- Family: Hesperiidae
- Genus: Amblyscirtes
- Species: A. reversa

Binomial name
- Amblyscirtes reversa F. M. Jones, 1926

= Amblyscirtes reversa =

Species of butterfly

Amblyscirtes reversa, the reversed roadside skipper, is a butterfly of the family Hesperiidae. The species was first described by Frank Morton Jones in 1926. It has a scattered distribution from south-eastern Virginia, south to northern Georgia. It is also found in southern Mississippi and southern Illinois.

The wingspan is 29–35 mm. Adults are on wing from April to August. There are two to three generations per year.

The larvae feed on Arundinaria tecta. Adults feed on flower nectar.
