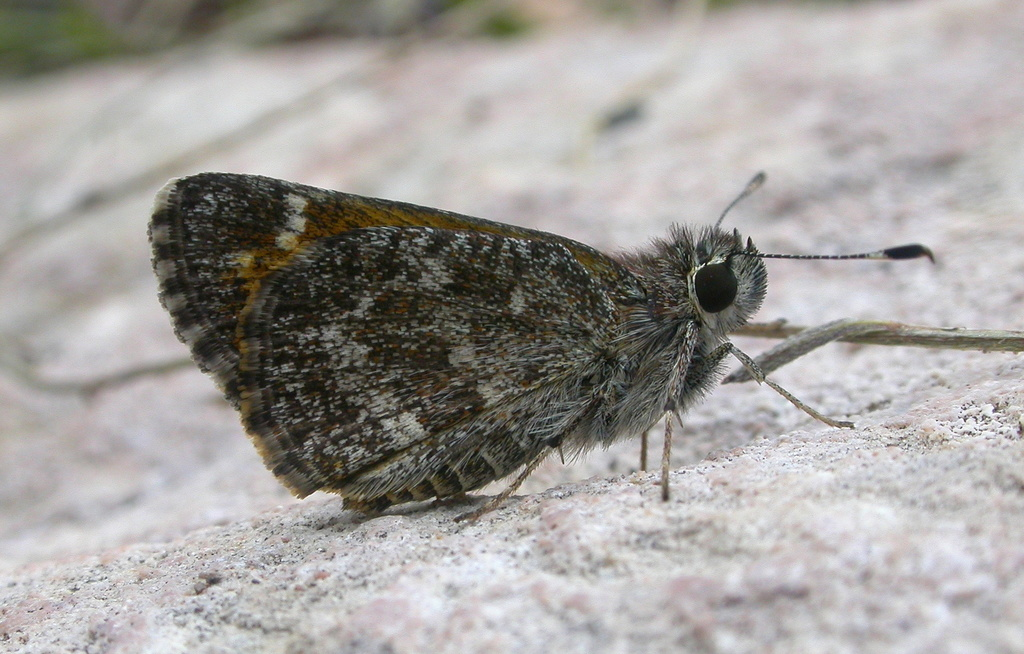

Conservation status
- Apparently Secure (NatureServe)

Scientific classification
- Kingdom: Animalia
- Phylum: Arthropoda
- Class: Insecta
- Order: Lepidoptera
- Family: Hesperiidae
- Genus: Amblyscirtes
- Species: A. cassus

Binomial name
- Amblyscirtes cassus W. H. Edwards, 1883

= Amblyscirtes cassus =

Species of butterfly

Amblyscirtes cassus, the cassus roadside skipper, is a species of grass skipper in the butterfly family Hesperiidae. It is found in Central America and North America.
