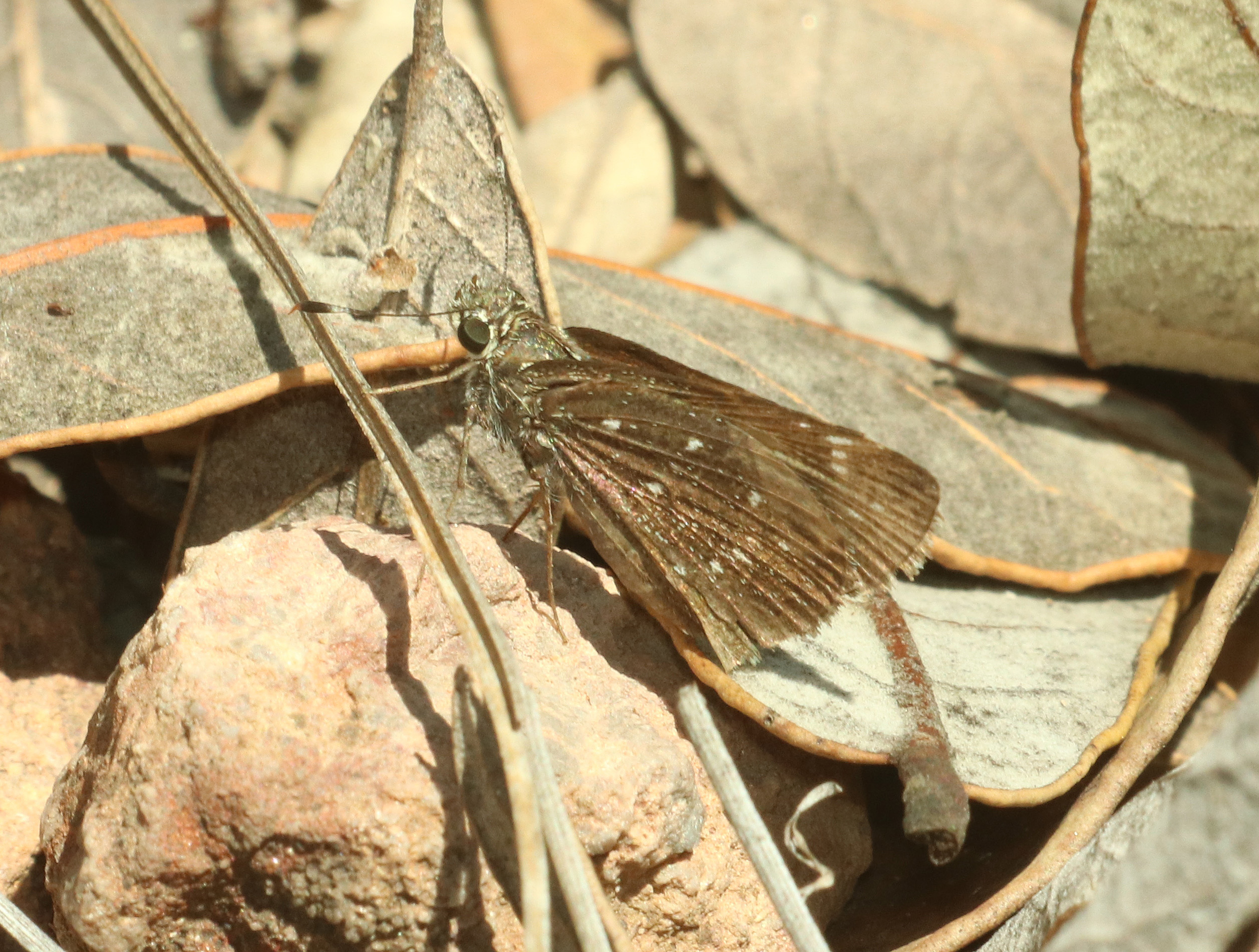

Scientific classification
- Kingdom: Animalia
- Phylum: Arthropoda
- Class: Insecta
- Order: Lepidoptera
- Family: Hesperiidae
- Genus: Amblyscirtes
- Species: A. elissa

Binomial name
- Amblyscirtes elissa Godman, 1900

= Amblyscirtes elissa =

Species of butterfly

Amblyscirtes elissa, the elissa roadside skipper, is a species of grass skipper in the butterfly family Hesperiidae. It is found in Central America and North America.

== Subspecies ==
These two subspecies belong to the species Amblyscirtes elissa:

- Amblyscirtes elissa arizonae H. Freeman, 1993
- Amblyscirtes elissa elissa Godman, 1900
