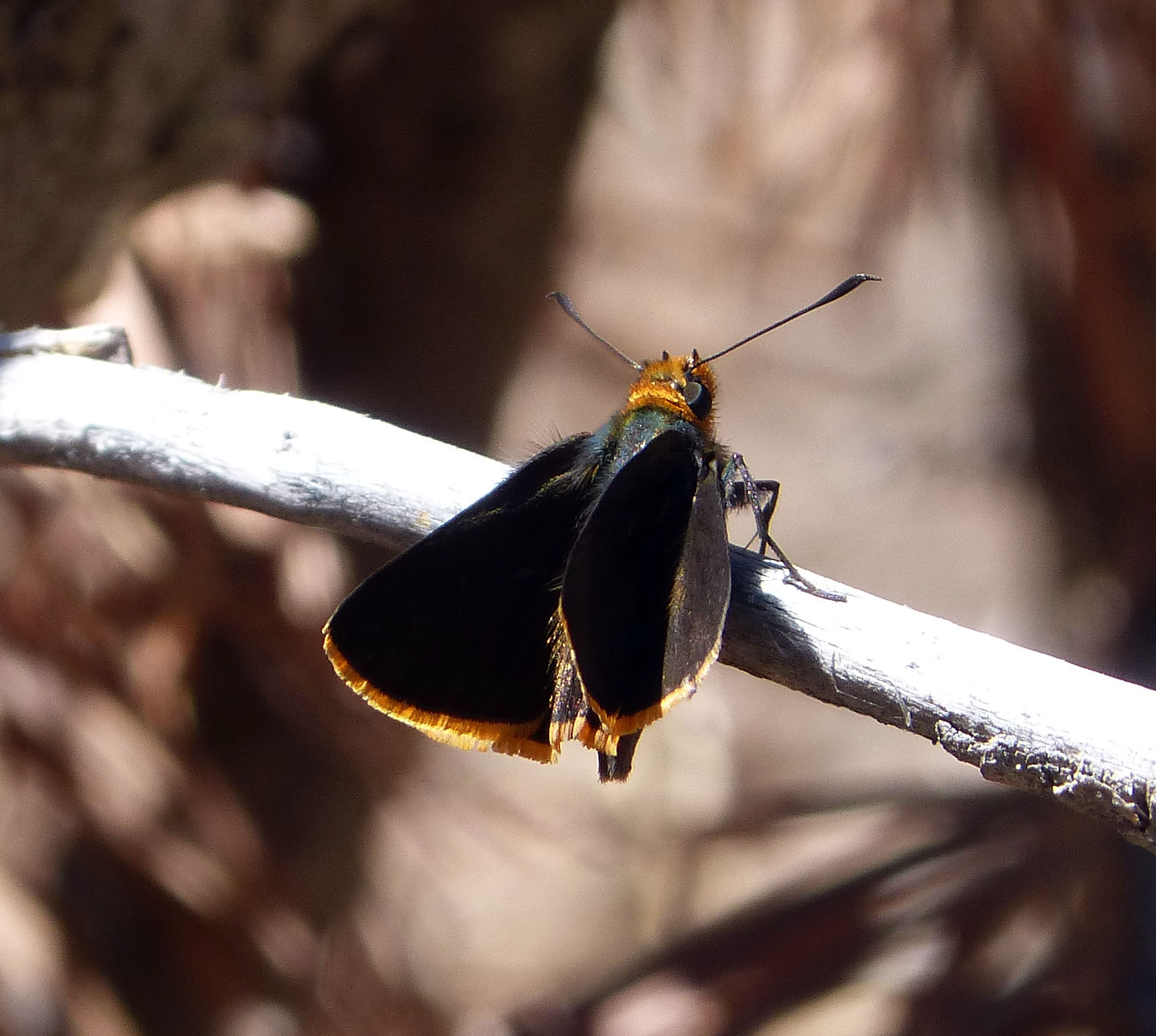

Scientific classification
- Kingdom: Animalia
- Phylum: Arthropoda
- Class: Insecta
- Order: Lepidoptera
- Family: Hesperiidae
- Genus: Amblyscirtes
- Species: A. fimbriata

Binomial name
- Amblyscirtes fimbriata (Plötz, 1882)

= Amblyscirtes fimbriata =

Species of butterfly

Amblyscirtes fimbriata, the orange-edged roadside skipper, is a species of grass skipper in the butterfly family Hesperiidae.

== Subspecies ==
These two subspecies belong to the species Amblyscirtes fimbriata:

- Amblyscirtes fimbriata fimbriata (Plötz, 1882)
- Amblyscirtes fimbriata pallida H. Freeman, 1993
