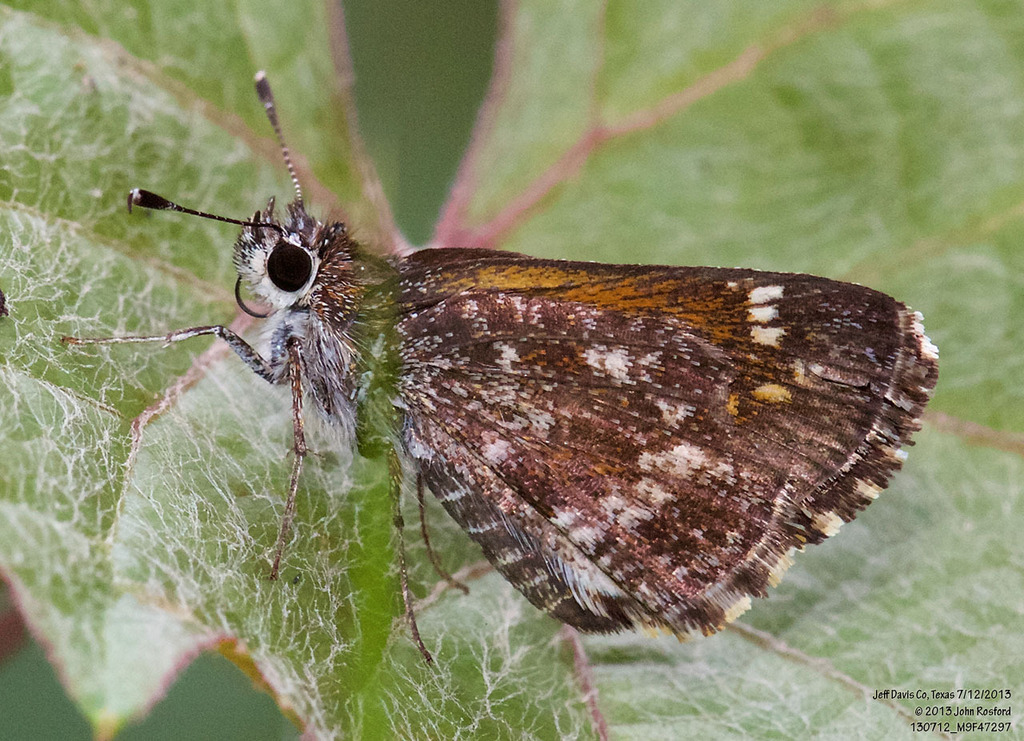

Conservation status
- Secure (NatureServe)

Scientific classification
- Kingdom: Animalia
- Phylum: Arthropoda
- Class: Insecta
- Order: Lepidoptera
- Family: Hesperiidae
- Genus: Amblyscirtes
- Species: A. aenus

Binomial name
- Amblyscirtes aenus W. H. Edwards, 1878

= Amblyscirtes aenus =

Species of butterfly

Amblyscirtes aenus, the bronze roadside skipper, is a species of grass skipper in the butterfly family Hesperiidae. It is found in Central America and North America.

== Subspecies ==
These three subspecies belong to the species Amblyscirtes aenus:

- Amblyscirtes aenus aenus W. H. Edwards, 1878
- Amblyscirtes aenus erna H. Freeman, 1943
- Amblyscirtes aenus megamacula Scott, 1998
