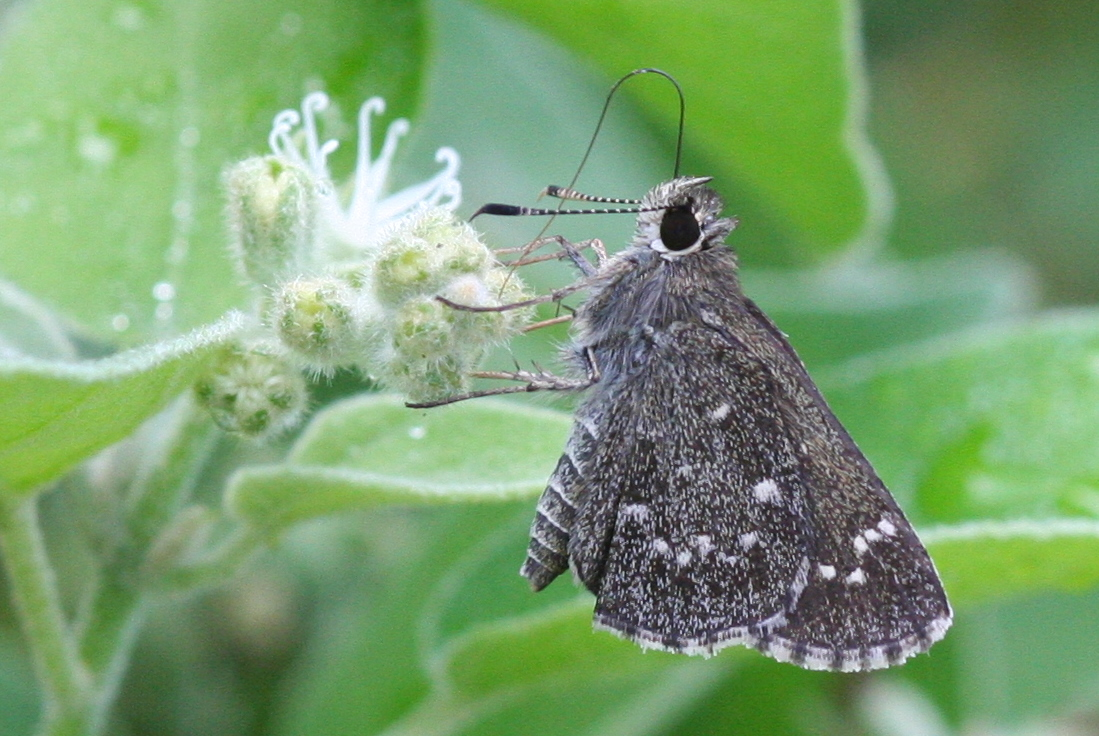

Scientific classification
- Kingdom: Animalia
- Phylum: Arthropoda
- Class: Insecta
- Order: Lepidoptera
- Family: Hesperiidae
- Genus: Amblyscirtes
- Species: A. celia

Binomial name
- Amblyscirtes celia Skinner, 1895

= Amblyscirtes celia =

Species of butterfly

Amblyscirtes celia (also called Celia's roadside skipper or roadside rambler) is a butterfly of the family Hesperiidae. It is found from Texas, south to north-eastern Mexico. Strays to south-western Louisiana.

The wingspan is 22–27 mm. Adults are on wing from May to September in central Texas and throughout the year in southern Texas. There are several generations per year.

The larvae probably feed on Paspalum species. Adults feed on flower nectar.
