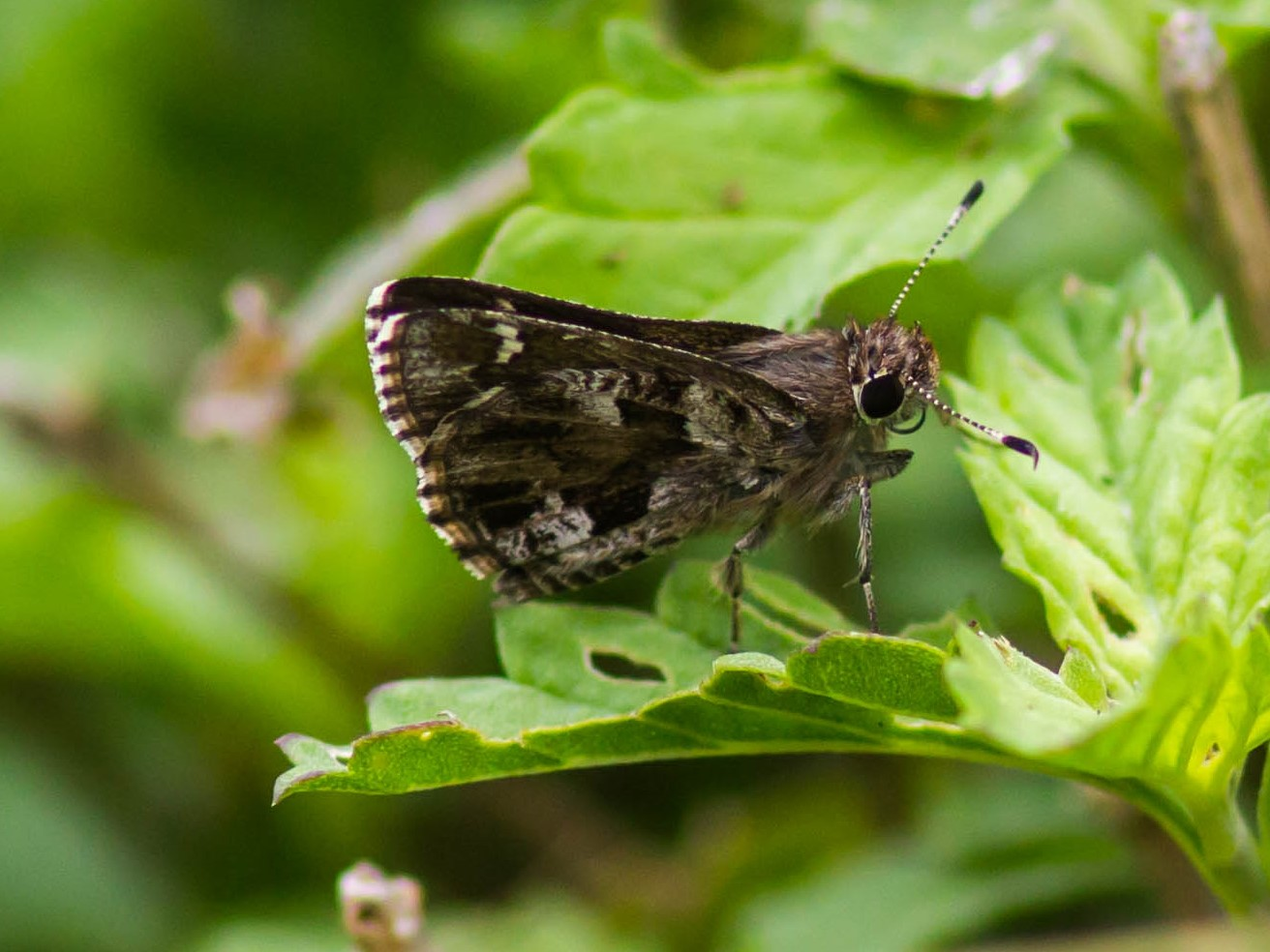

Scientific classification
- Kingdom: Animalia
- Phylum: Arthropoda
- Class: Insecta
- Order: Lepidoptera
- Family: Hesperiidae
- Genus: Amblyscirtes
- Species: A. nysa

Binomial name
- Amblyscirtes nysa W. H. Edwards, 1877

Synonyms
- Pamphila similis Strecker, 1878

= Amblyscirtes nysa =

Species of butterfly

Amblyscirtes nysa, the nysa roadside skipper, is a species of grass skipper in the family of butterflies known as Hesperiidae. They are found in Central America and North America.
