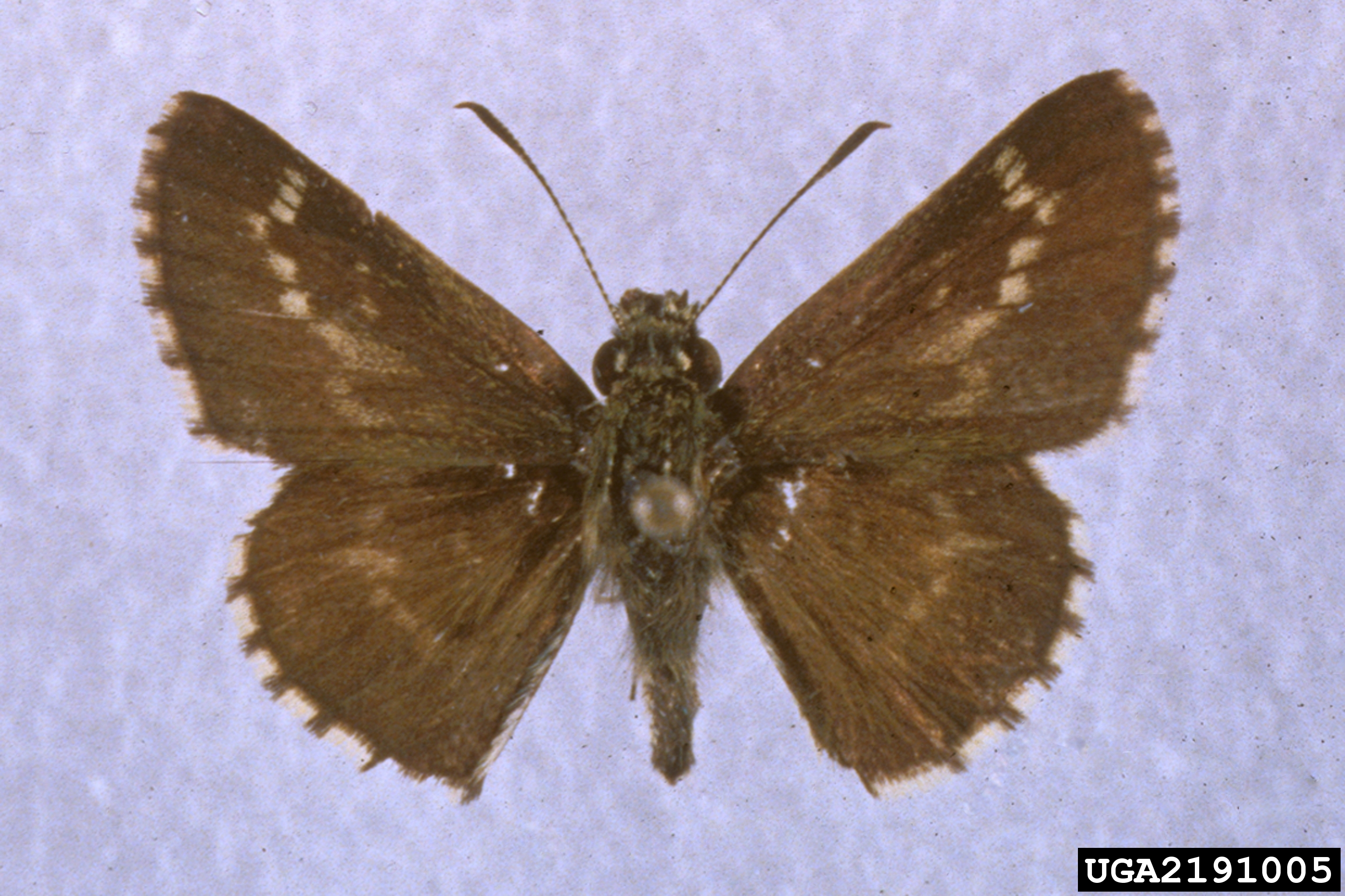

Conservation status
- Vulnerable (NatureServe)

Scientific classification
- Kingdom: Animalia
- Phylum: Arthropoda
- Class: Insecta
- Order: Lepidoptera
- Family: Hesperiidae
- Genus: Amblyscirtes
- Species: A. aesculapius

Binomial name
- Amblyscirtes aesculapius (Fabricius, 1793)

Synonyms
- Hesperia aesculapius Fabricius, 1793; Pyrgus textor Geyer, 1827-1831; Hesperia oneko Scudder, 1864; Hesperia wakulla Edwards, 1869

= Amblyscirtes aesculapius =

Species of butterfly

Amblyscirtes aesculapius (the lace-winged roadside skipper) is a butterfly of the family Hesperiidae. It is found from eastern Oklahoma and eastern Texas, east to south-east Virginia, south along the Atlantic Coast to northern Florida.

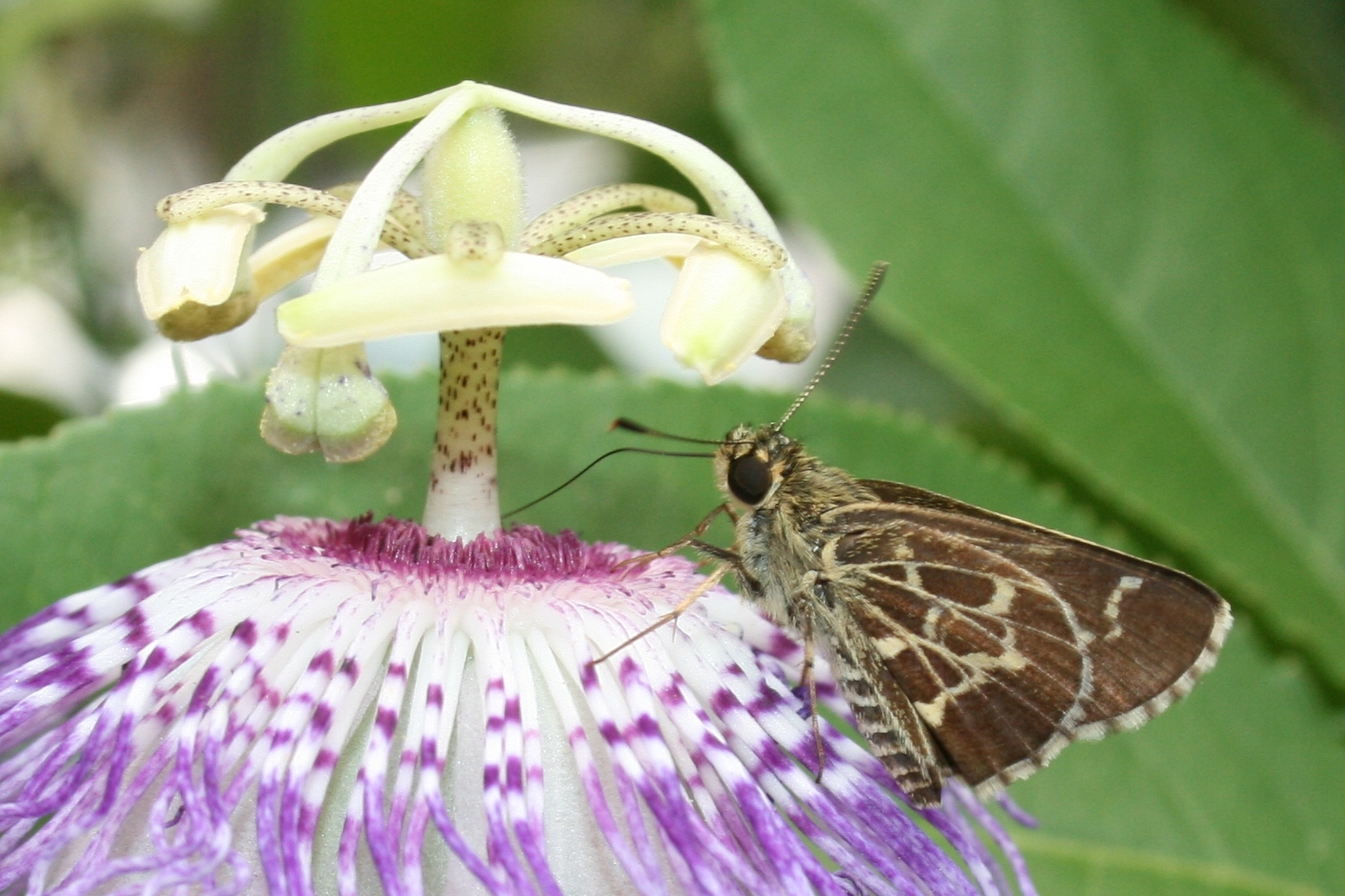

The wingspan is 30–38 mm. Adults are on wing from March to September. There are two generations per year.

The larvae probably feed on Arundinaria species. Adults feed on the nectar from various flowers, including elephant's-foot, sweet pepperbush, blackberry, white clover, selfheal and dogbane.
