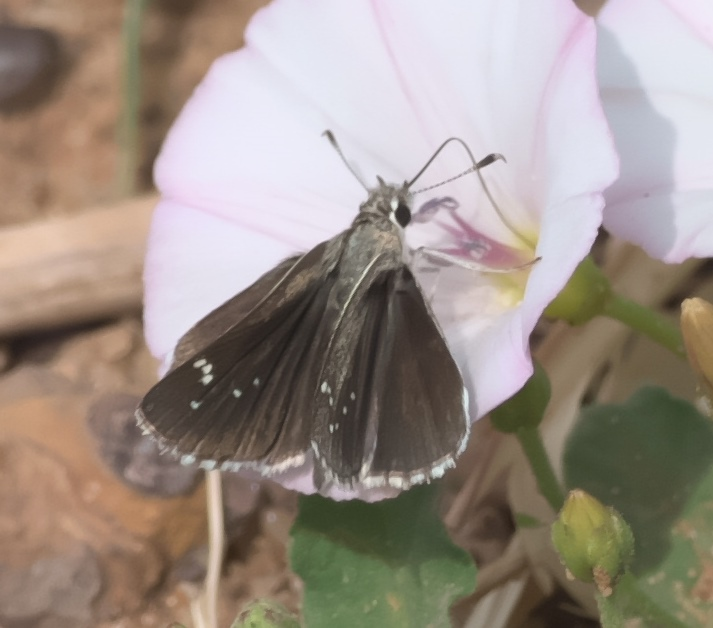

Scientific classification
- Kingdom: Animalia
- Phylum: Arthropoda
- Class: Insecta
- Order: Lepidoptera
- Family: Hesperiidae
- Genus: Amblyscirtes
- Species: A. eos

Binomial name
- Amblyscirtes eos (W. H. Edwards, 1871)

Synonyms
- Amblyscirtes nilus W. H. Edwards, 1878; Hesperia comus W. H. Edwards, 1876; Pamphila quinquemacula Skinner, 1911

= Amblyscirtes eos =

Species of butterfly

Amblyscirtes eos, the dotted roadside skipper, is a species of grass skipper in the butterfly family Hesperiidae.
