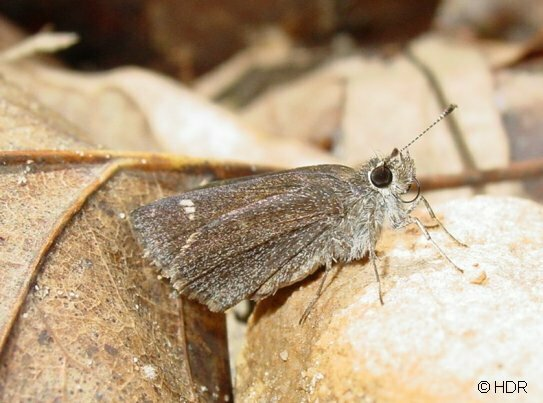

Conservation status
- Imperiled (NatureServe)

Scientific classification
- Kingdom: Animalia
- Phylum: Arthropoda
- Class: Insecta
- Order: Lepidoptera
- Family: Hesperiidae
- Genus: Amblyscirtes
- Species: A. linda

Binomial name
- Amblyscirtes linda H. Freeman, 1943

= Amblyscirtes linda =

Species of butterfly

Amblyscirtes linda, or Linda's roadside skipper, is a species of grass skipper in the family Hesperiidae. It was described by Hugh Avery Freeman in 1943 and is found in North America.

== Description ==
The upperside of the wings is dark brown with a few light spots. The males forewing has an obscure stigma. The underside of forewing is deep brown with a black tip. The hindwing is black-brown with gray overscales and a band of pale gray spots. The wingspan ranges from 1 1/8 to 1 5/16 inches (or 2.9 to 3.4 centimeters.)
