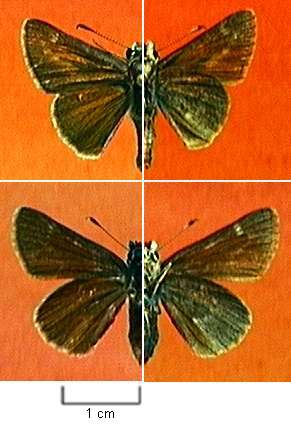

Scientific classification
- Kingdom: Animalia
- Phylum: Arthropoda
- Clade: Pancrustacea
- Class: Insecta
- Order: Lepidoptera
- Family: Hesperiidae
- Genus: Amblyscirtes
- Species: A. oslari

Binomial name
- Amblyscirtes oslari (Skinner, 1899)

Synonyms
- Pamphila oslari Skinner, 1899

= Amblyscirtes oslari =

Oslar's roadside skipper

Species of butterfly

Amblyscirtes oslari, the Oslar's roadside skipper, is a butterfly of the family Hesperiidae. It is found in North America from southern Alberta, Saskatchewan, and North Dakota south through the high plains and Rocky Mountains to Arizona, New Mexico, and south Texas.

The wingspan is 22–35 mm. Adults are on wing from May to July. There is one generation per year in the north and two in the south.

The larvae feed on blue grama grass (Bouteloua gracilis). Adults feed on flower nectar, including Penstemon, Cirsium, and Verbena.
