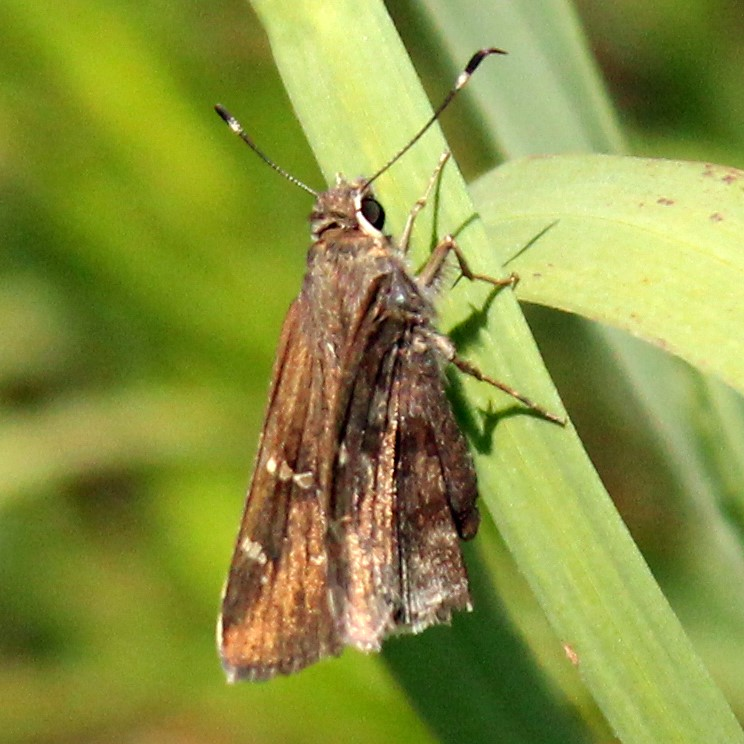

Scientific classification
- Kingdom: Animalia
- Phylum: Arthropoda
- Class: Insecta
- Order: Lepidoptera
- Family: Hesperiidae
- Genus: Cogia
- Species: C. outis

Binomial name
- Cogia outis (Skinner, 1894)

= Cogia outis =

Species of butterfly

Cogia outis, known generally as the outis skipper or button-grass skipper, is a species of dicot skipper in the butterfly family Hesperiidae.
