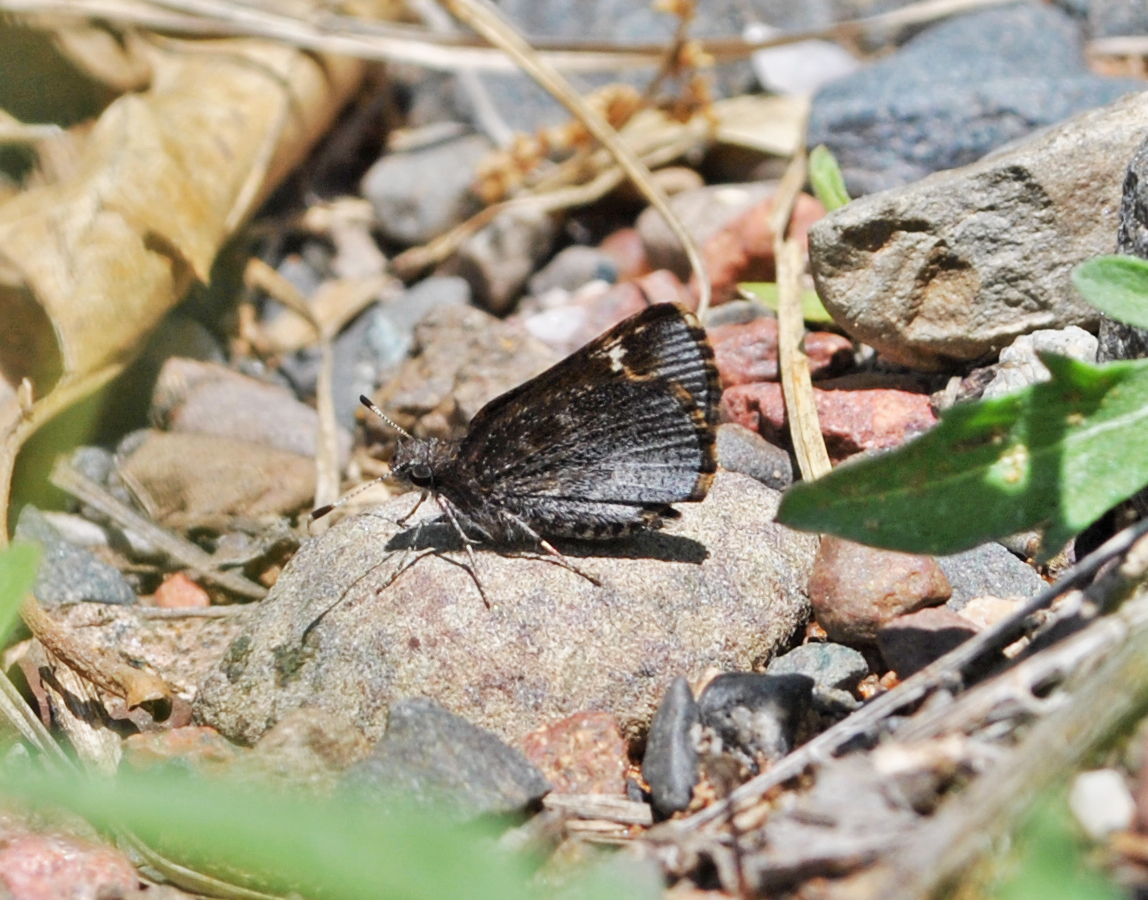

Conservation status
- Secure (NatureServe)

Scientific classification
- Kingdom: Animalia
- Phylum: Arthropoda
- Class: Insecta
- Order: Lepidoptera
- Family: Hesperiidae
- Genus: Amblyscirtes
- Species: A. vialis

Binomial name
- Amblyscirtes vialis (Edwards, 1862)

Synonyms
- Hesperia vialis Edwards, 1862; Cobalus asella Herrich-Schäffer, 1869

= Amblyscirtes vialis =

Species of butterfly

Amblyscirtes vialis (the common roadside skipper) is a butterfly of the family Hesperiidae. It is found from British Columbia east across southern Canada to Maine and Nova Scotia, south to central California, northern New Mexico, Texas, the Gulf states and northern Florida.

The wingspan is 22–32 mm. Adults are on wing from March to July. There is one generation per year and a partial second generation up to September in the south.

The larvae feed on various grasses including wild oats (Avena), bent grass (Agrostis), bluegrass (Poa), Bermuda grass (Cynodon dactylon), and Indian woodoats grass (Chasmanthium latifolia). Adults feed on flower nectar, they prefer low-growing blue flowers including verbena and selfheal.

The species is listed as endangered in the Connecticut by state authorities.

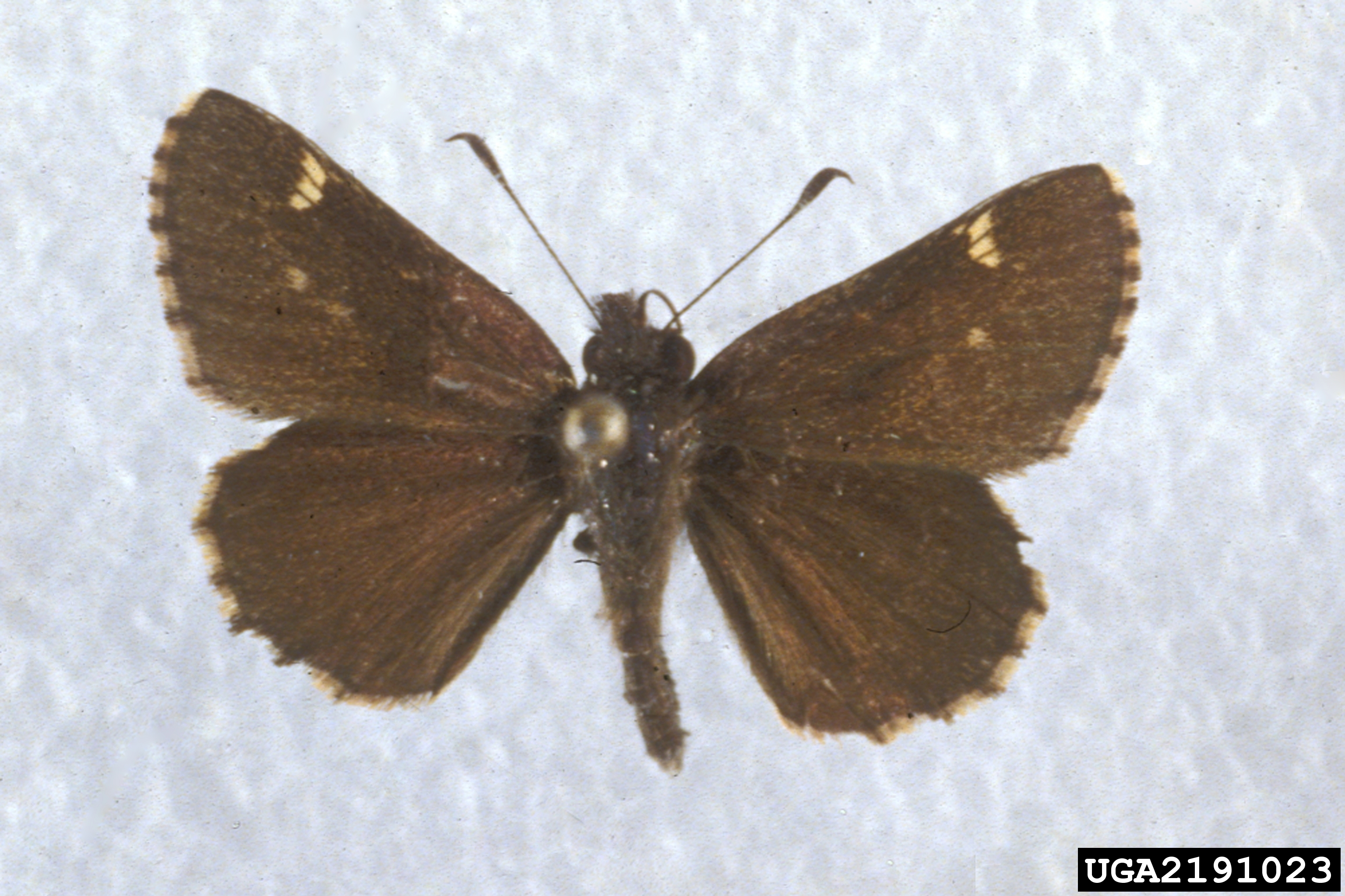
common roadside skipper specimen
