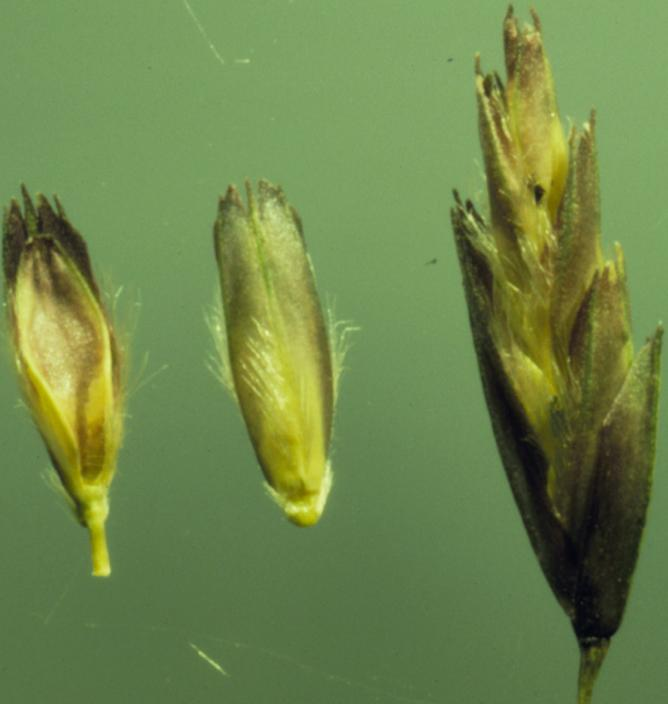
- Tridens flavus

Scientific classification
- Kingdom: Plantae
- Clade: Tracheophytes
- Clade: Angiosperms
- Clade: Monocots
- Clade: Commelinids
- Order: Poales
- Family: Poaceae
- Subfamily: Chloridoideae
- Tribe: Cynodonteae
- Subtribe: Pappophorinae
- Genus: Tridens; Roem. & Schult.

Type species
- Tridens flavus

Synonyms
- Antonella Caro; Gossweilerochloa Renvoize; Tricuspis P.Beauv. 1812, illegitimate homonym not Pers. 1806; Windsoria Nutt.

= Tridens (plant) =

Genus of flowering plants

Tridens is a genus of perennial grasses in the family Poaceae native to the Americas.

== Species ==
13 species are accepted.

- Tridens albescens (Vasey) Wooton & Standl. - southwest + south-central USA (AZ NM TX LA AR OK KS), Mexico (Chihuahua, Durango, Coahuila, Tamaulipas, Nuevo León)
- Tridens ambiguus (Elliott) Schult. – pine barren fluffgrass - southeastern USA (TX LA MS AL GA FL SC NC)
- Tridens brasiliensis (Nees ex Steud.) Parodi - Brazil, Paraguay, Uruguay, Argentina
- Tridens carolinianus (Steud.) Henrard - southeastern USA (LA MS AL GA FL SC NC)
- Tridens chapmanii (Small) Chase – south-central and southeastern United States to New Jersey
- Tridens congestus (L.H.Dewey) Nash – pink fluffgrass USA (AZ TX)
- Tridens flaccidus (Döll) Parodi - Brazil, Guyana, Venezuela, Colombia
- Tridens flavus (L.) Hitchc. – purpletop - Ontario, eastern + central USA, Nuevo León
- Tridens hackelii (Arechav.) Parodi - Brazil, Uruguay, Argentina
- Tridens nicorae Anton - northern Argentina
- Tridens × oklahomensis (Feath.) Feath. - Oklahoma (hybrid T. flavus × T. strictus)
- Tridens riograndensis Acedo & Llamas - Rio Grande do Sul in Brazil
- Tridens strictus (Nutt.) Nash – longspike tridens - southeastern + south-central USA (from TX to FL to IL + PA)
- Tridens texanus (S. Watson) Nash - USA (TX NM), Mexico (Chihuahua, Durango, Coahuila, Nuevo León, Tamaulipas, San Luis Potosí)

Formerly included

see Dasyochloa, Diplachne, Erioneuron, and Tridentopsis
- Tridens avenaceus - Erioneuron avenaceum
- Tridens buckleyanus (Vasey ex L.H.Dewey) Nash - Tridentopsis buckleyana (L.H.Dewey) P.M.Peterson & Romasch.
- Tridens capensis - Diplachne fusca
- Tridens duartei - Diplachne fusca subsp. uninervia
- Tridens eragrostoides (Vasey & Scribn.) Nash - Triplasiella eragrostoides (Vasey & Scribn.) P.M.Peterson & Romasch.
- Tridens grandiflorus - Erioneuron avenaceum
- Tridens indicus - Diplachne fusca
- Tridens muticus (Torr.) Nash - Tridentopsis mutica (Torr.) P.M.Peterson
- Tridens nealleyi - Erioneuron avenaceum var. nealleyi
- Tridens pulchellus - Dasyochloa pulchella
- Tridens veralensis - Diplachne fusca subsp. fascicularis
- Tridens verticillata - Diplachne fusca subsp. uninervia
- Tridens virens - Diplachne fusca subsp. fascicularis
