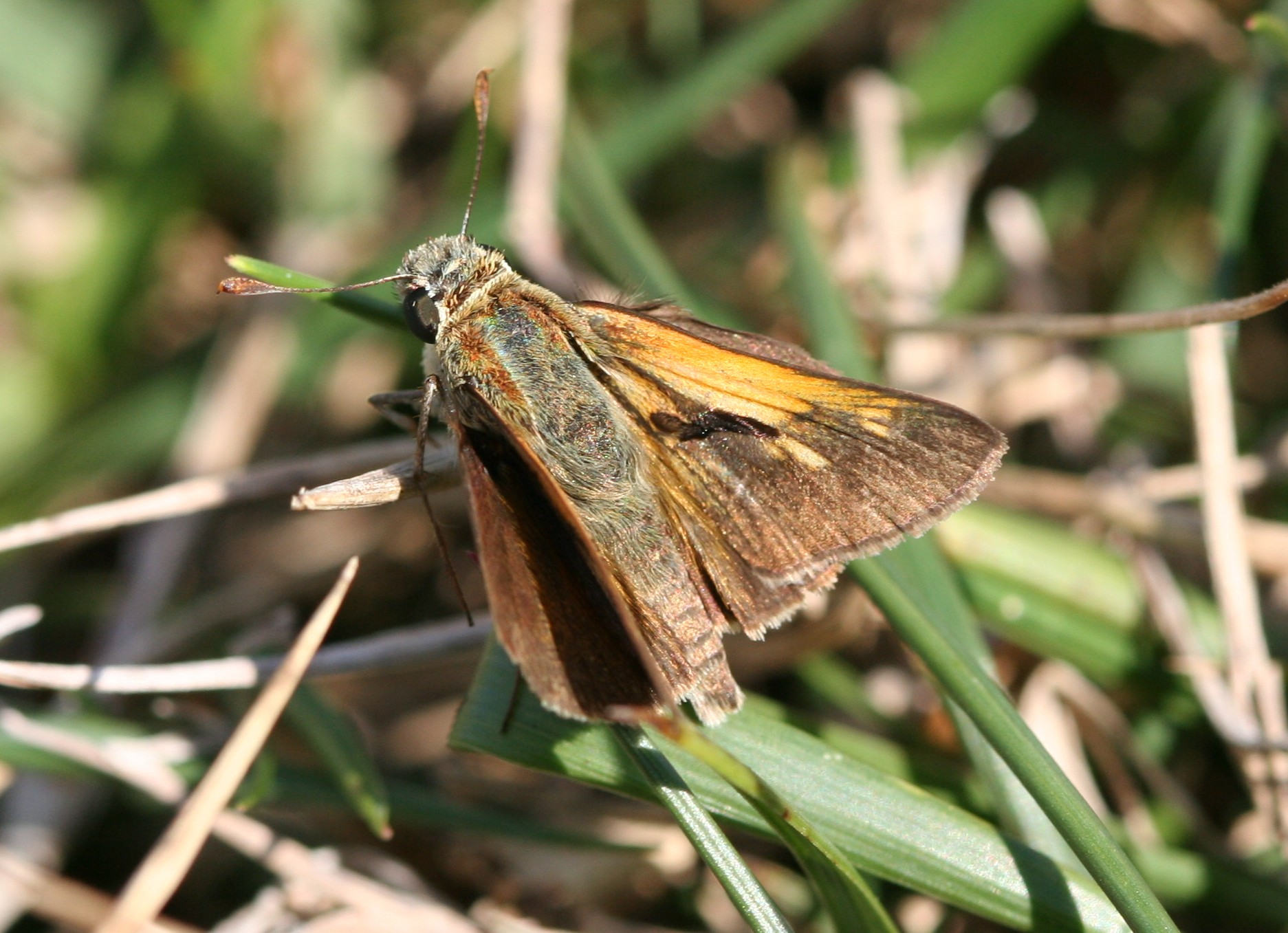

Conservation status
- Secure (NatureServe)

Scientific classification
- Kingdom: Animalia
- Phylum: Arthropoda
- Class: Insecta
- Order: Lepidoptera
- Family: Hesperiidae
- Genus: Polites
- Species: P. themistocles

Binomial name
- Polites themistocles (Latreille, 1824)
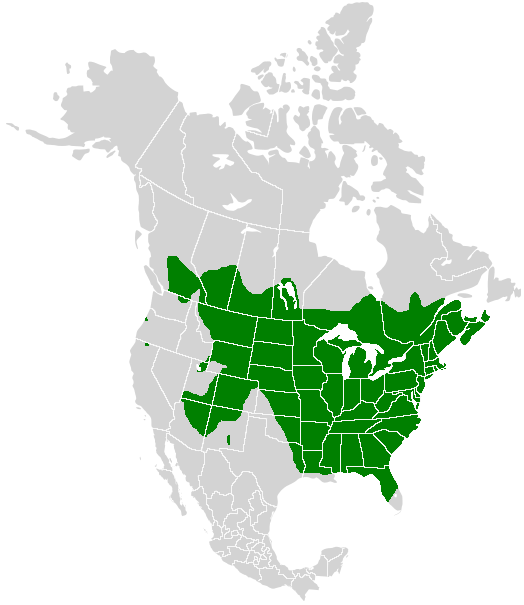

= Polites themistocles =

Tawny-edged skipper

Species of butterfly

Polites themistocles, the tawny-edged skipper, is a North American butterfly in the family Hesperiidae.

== Description ==
This species varies geographically and within populations. The upper side of the male's wings is brown or olive brown with the forewing having bright orange along the costa that ends at the stigma. The stigma is thicker than the male crossline skipper's (Polites origenes) and it usually runs more parallel to the costa. The upperside of the female's wings is brown with the forewing having a less conspicuous orange costa than the male. Near the end of the forewing cell there are two rectangular pale spots and three pale spots in a row in the subapical area. The underside of the wings vary form light brown to brown to brownish-orange. Sometimes the hindwing will have a crossband like the crossline skipper, but it is usually much more faint. The "tawny-edged" forewing strongly contrasts with the hindwing color. Its wingspan ranges from 3/4 to 1 inch (19–25 mm).

== Similar species ==
Similar species in the tawny-edged skipper's range include the crossline skipper and the Baracoa skipper (Polites baracoa).

Crossline skippers are usually larger than tawny-edged skippers. The male has a thinner forewing stigma, and it does not run parallel to the costa. The female has less or no orange along the forewing costa and has two or three pale forewing spots with the central one being more squarish. The underside of both wings is olive brown to brown with the hindwing having a pale crossband.

The Baracoa skipper is smaller than the tawny-edged skipper. The male has a short and straight stigma. The female has a lost of orange on her forewing and has dark patches in the same locations as the male. The underside of the wings is very similar to the tawny-edged skipper's except the hindwing has a pale crossband.

== Habitat ==
This species favors a wide range of habitats including alpine bogs, forest glades, grassy areas, moist meadows, savannas, and stream sides.

== Flight ==
This skipper flies from June to early August in the north and west, May to August in the east, and May to early November in the deep south.

== Life cycle ==
Most of the day, males perch on grass blades or stems to await females. Females lay their greenish white eggs on or near the host plant. The larva lives in a nest by tying leaves together with silk. The variable brown larva is indistinguishable from closely related larvae. The overwintering stage is the pupa. The tawny-edged skipper has one brood per year in the northeast and northwest and two or three broods per year in the deep south.

== Host plants ==
Host plants of the tawny-edged skipper include:

- Slender crabgrass (Digitaria filiformis)
- Panicum microcarpum
- Smooth meadow-grass (Poa pratensis)
