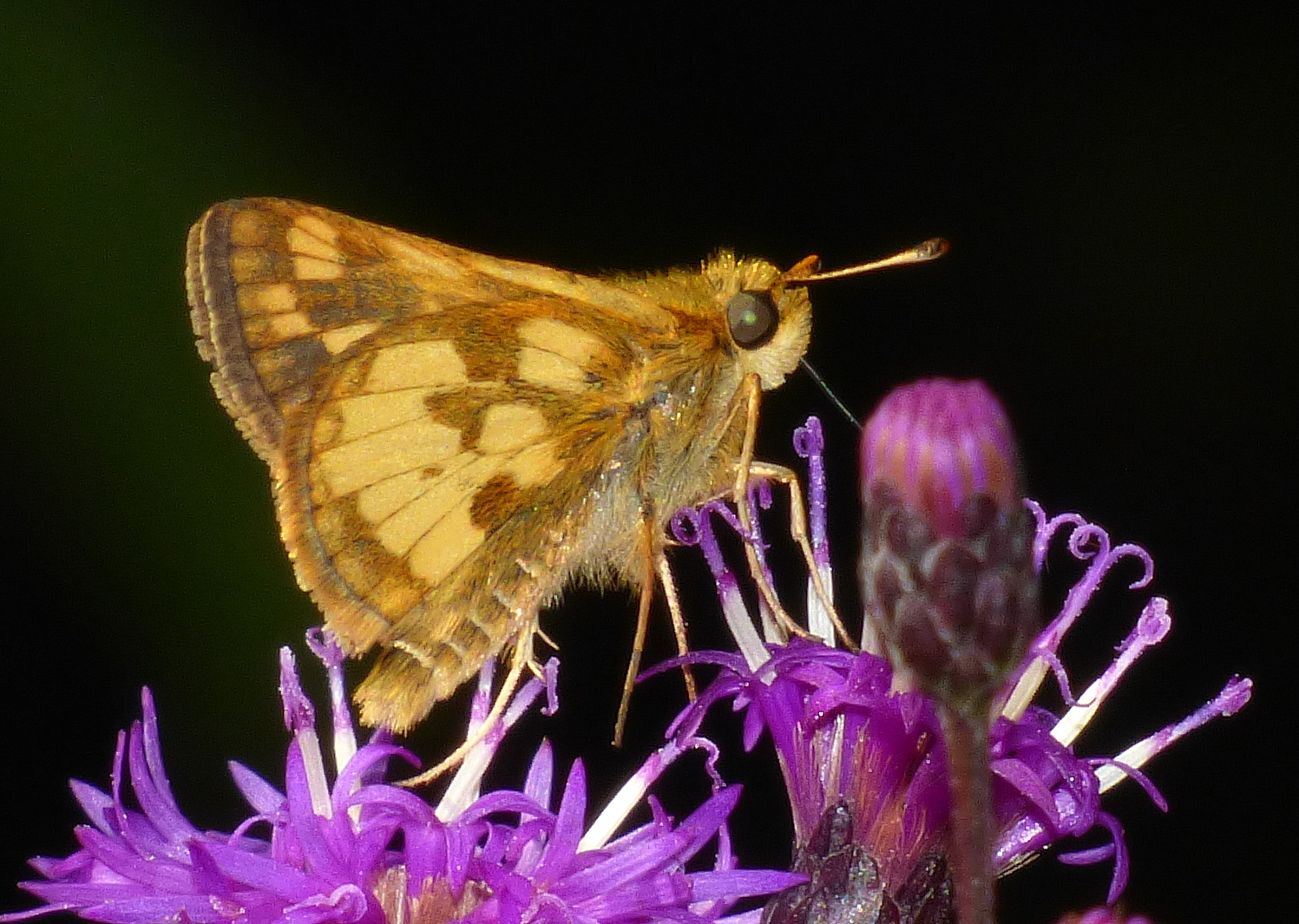
- Near Cincinnati, Ohio
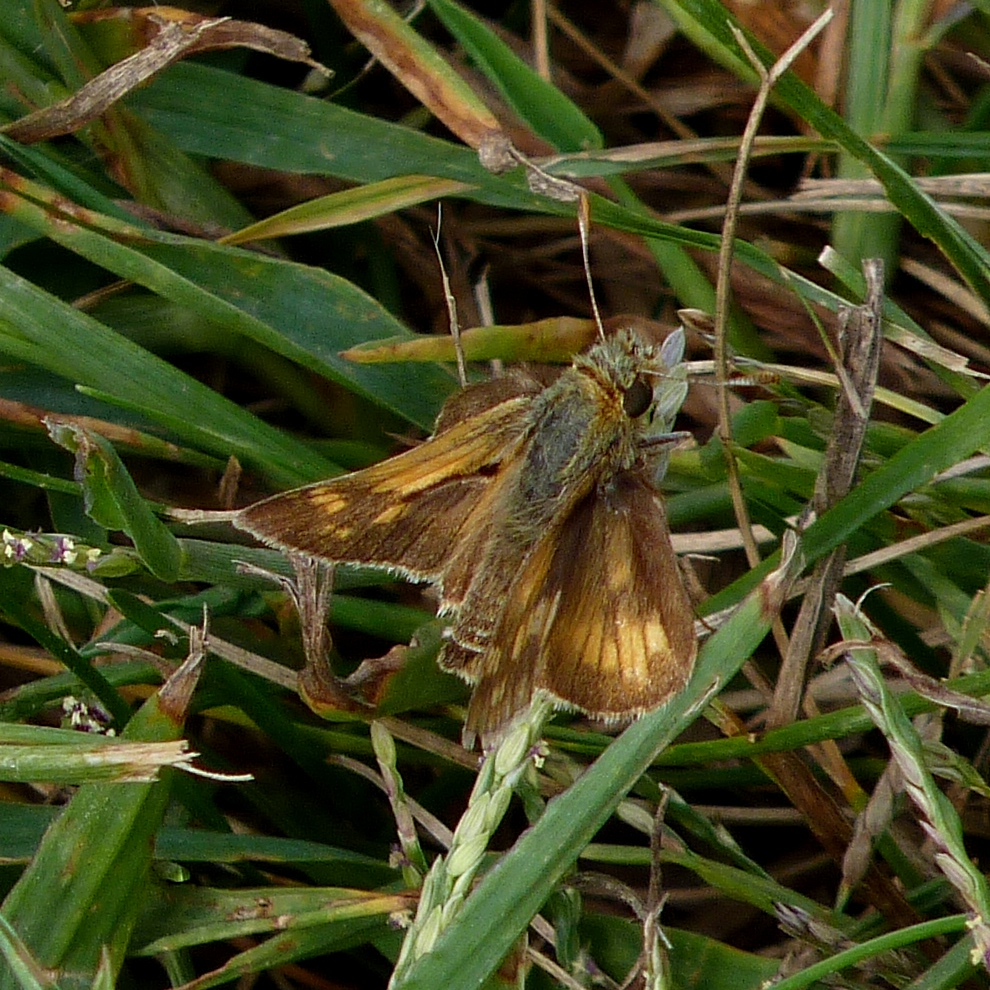

Conservation status
- Secure (NatureServe)

Scientific classification
- Kingdom: Animalia
- Phylum: Arthropoda
- Clade: Pancrustacea
- Class: Insecta
- Order: Lepidoptera
- Family: Hesperiidae
- Genus: Polites
- Species: P. peckius

Binomial name
- Polites peckius W. Kirby, 1837

Synonyms
- Polites coras

= Polites peckius =

Peck's skipper

Species of butterfly

Several peck's skippers on blossoms, including slow motion.

Polites peckius, the Peck's skipper, is a North American butterfly in the family Hesperiidae (skippers), subfamily Hesperiinae (grass skippers). This skipper ranges across Canada from British Columbia, as far north as Cartwright, Labrador; Moar Lake, Ontario; Leaf Rapids, Manitoba; and the Hay River area in Alberta. In the US, it ranges in most of the northern and central states, except on the west coast.

== Description ==
Both sexes have dark brown and yellowish-orange markings as adults. Ventrally, both sexes have a large straw-coloured patch in the middle of the hindwing. This patch helps distinguish it from other Polites. Males are lighter than females, and they have a stigma (round or oval mark) on the forewing. Like other skippers, the ends of the antennae have tiny hooks. The wingspan ranges from 19 to 27 mm.

== Behavior and life cycle ==
Peck's skipper flies from May to October, and produces two or three generations each year. Adults consume nectar from flowers including red clover, purple vetch, and thistles. They typically live in grassy habitats including meadows, marshes, and roadsides. Similar to other grass skippers, this species commonly rests with the forewings held open in a V shape, while the hindwings are held out horizontally to the side. They may also have all four folded together so that only the bottom surfaces are visible. Males perch in sunny open areas to await receptive females, and courtship takes place throughout the day. After mating, females lay single eggs. The caterpillars consume rice cutgrass, bluegrass and other grasses.
