= Vernia =

Vernia may refer to:

- Vernia (album), an album by American rapper Erick Sermon
- Vernia (butterfly), a genus of skipper butterflies in the tribe Hesperiini
- La Vernia, Texas
