= Greasy grass =

Greasy grass may refer to:

- Tridens flavus, a common perennial bunchgrass of eastern North America known as "greasy grass" or "grease grass"
- Battle of the Little Bighorn, also known as "Battle of the Greasy Grass"
