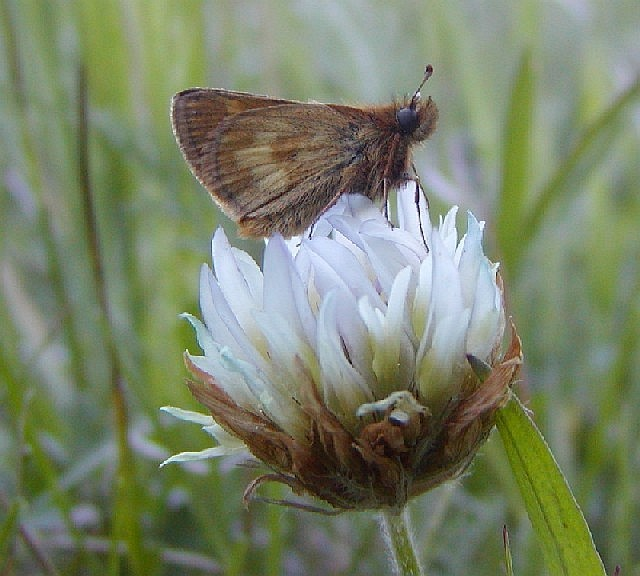

Conservation status
- Imperiled (NatureServe)

Scientific classification
- Kingdom: Animalia
- Phylum: Arthropoda
- Clade: Pancrustacea
- Class: Insecta
- Order: Lepidoptera
- Family: Hesperiidae
- Genus: Polites
- Species: P. mardon

Binomial name
- Polites mardon (W. H. Edwards, 1881)

= Polites mardon =

Species of butterfly

Polites mardon, the Mardon skipper, is a butterfly native to the United States' northwest coast.

== Description ==
The Mardon skipper is a small butterfly, less than one inch (25 mm), that belongs to the family Hesperiidae. Its habitat extends from the northwestern coast of Washington through southern Oregon and northern California. In Washington, the Mardon skipper can be found in the Puget prairies and the South Cascades.

Some distinguishing characteristics of this species are a hairy orange body with dark orange accents on the upper surface and a light orange lower surface with white-yellowish rectangular spots. Males are known to be darker than females and smaller. Other species with very similar attributes include the Sonora skipper (Polites sonora) and the woodland skipper (Ochlodes sylvanoides).

This butterfly species, native to the northwest, is most commonly found on prairies populated by native grasses such as Roemer's fescue (Festuca roemeri) and red fescue (Festuca rubra). These native plants serve as oviposition sites. Some of the native plants that provide the species with nectar include the early blue violet (Viola adunca), prairie lupine (Lupinus lepidus), as well as Idaho blue-eyed grass (Sisyrinchum idahoense), penstemon (Penstemon species) and vetch (Vicia species).

== Conservation status ==
The Mardon skipper butterfly is currently listed as an endangered species in Washington state and classified as a federal endangered species. Its status denotes a high priority for conservation efforts. Over the years, studies have been assessing the decline of this species in the Puget prairies, by conducting population counts and habitat characteristics and their effect on the Mardon skipper's life cycle.

== Threats ==
The Mardon skipper is a non-migratory species, so its response to changes in habitat is minimized, especially during the larval stage. This species is known to prefer open grasslands populated by native plants that can serve as host plants as well as nectar sources. Their optimal habitat can be easily degraded through conversion and fragmentation, increase in invasive species, as well as changes in weather and human actions.
