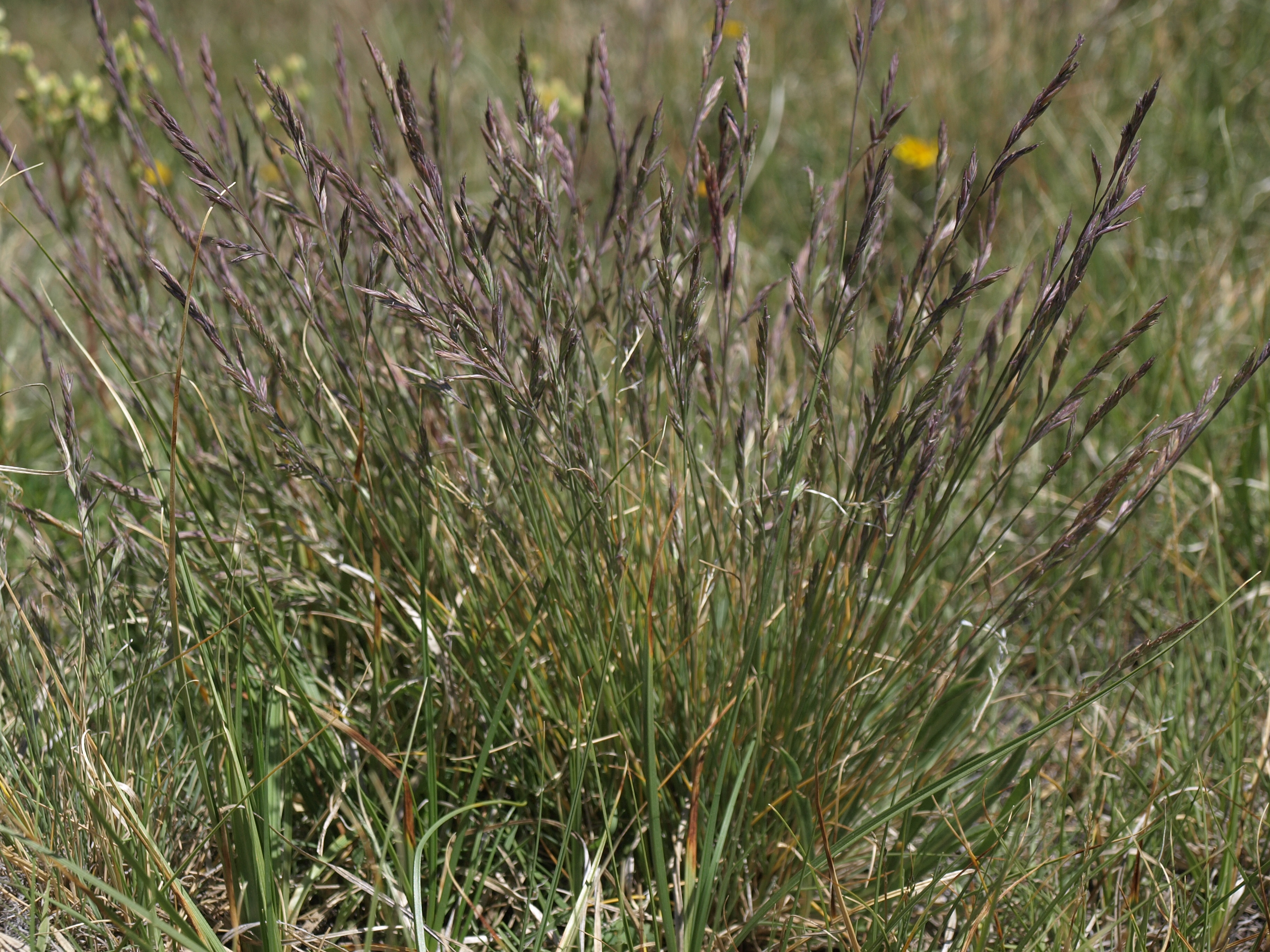

Scientific classification
- Kingdom: Plantae
- Clade: Tracheophytes
- Clade: Angiosperms
- Clade: Monocots
- Clade: Commelinids
- Order: Poales
- Family: Poaceae
- Subfamily: Pooideae
- Genus: Festuca
- Species: F. saximontana

Binomial name
- Festuca saximontana Rydb.

Synonyms
- Festuca brachyphylla subsp. saximontana (Rydb.) Hultén; Festuca ovina subsp. saximontana (Rydb.) St.-Yves

= Festuca saximontana =

Species of grass

Festuca saximontana, the rocky mountain fescue or the mountain fescue, is a perennial grass native to North America. The specific epithet saximontana is Latin and means "of the Rocky Mountains". The grass has a diploid number of 42.

== Taxonomy ==
Festuca saximontana was reduced by Hultén in 1942 to Festuca brachyphylla subsp. saximontana but recognized the species as separate in 1968 on the basis of anther length. In 1982 it was noted that F. saximontana differs from F. brachyphylla in its strongly developed leaf sclerenchyma and longer anthers. The two species are typically distinct, but intermediate specimens with an overlap of anther size, leaf size, and sclerenchyma development occur rarely in the northern areas of the distribution of F. saximontana.

== Description ==
Festuca saximontana is a bluish-grey to green densely tufted grass that lacks rhizomes. The grass has smooth, glabrous, occasionally scabrous culms growing 7–70 cm (2.8–27.6 in) tall. The culms sometimes become puberulent below the inflorescence. The glabrous and smooth or scabrous leaf sheaths are closed for half of their length and occasionally become shredded. Dead leaf sheaths persist at the base of the grass. The erose ligules measure 0.1–0.5 mm (0.0039–0.0197 in). The conduplicate leaf blades are 0.5–1.2 mm (0.020–0.047 in) in diameter, with glabrous abaxial surfaces and scabrous adaxial surfaces. The abaxial sclerenchyma is composed of three to seven strands that form a continuous band and the adaxial sclerenchyma is absent. The flag leaf blades are 0.5–4 cm (0.20–1.57 in) long. The panicles are mostly linear-cylindrical and occasionally loosely lanceolate, measuring 2–10 cm (0.79–3.94 in) long. One or two erect branches rise from each node of the inflorescence and become nodding during anthesis, measuring 0.5–3 cm (0.20–1.18 in) long. The greenish spikelets are loosely flowered with three to five florets and measure 4.5–8.8 mm (0.18–0.35 in). The coriaceous glumes are lance-subulate and become scabrous at their distal end. The lower glumes measure 1.5–3.5 mm (0.059–0.138 in) and have one vein, and the upper glumes measure 2.5–4.8 mm (0.098–0.189 in) and have three veins. The coriaceous lemmas are strongly curved, the longer of which measure 3–5 mm (0.12–0.20 in) long. The awns measure 1–2 mm (0.039–0.079 in). The paleas are 3–5 mm (0.12–0.20 in) long. The anthers are 1.2–1.7 mm (0.047–0.067 in) long.

== Distribution and habitat ==
Festuca saximontana grows in dry or mesic grasslands, woodlands, and sand dunes throughout boreal, mountainous, and subalpine North America. It grows at altitudes below 3,600 m (11,800 ft).

Festuca saximontana occurs from Alaska to Greenland, as far south as California and New Mexico and as far east as the Great Lakes, and is rarely found in the Russian Far East. It has a slightly more southern distribution than Festuca brachyphylla, not occurring in the Arctic Circle or some of the Canadian archipelago.

== Ecology ==
Festuca saximontana is a host plant for the western branded skipper and the draco skipper.
