= Tridens strictus =

Scientific classification
- Kingdom: Plantae
- Clade: Tracheophytes
- Clade: Angiosperms
- Clade: Monocots
- Clade: Commelinids
- Order: Poales
- Family: Poaceae
- Subfamily: Chloridoideae
- Genus: Tridens
- Species: T. strictus

Binomial name
- Tridens strictus (Nutt.) Nash

Synonyms
- Sieglingia stricta (Nutt.) Kuntze; Tricuspis stricta (Nutt.) Alph.Wood; Triodia stricta (Nutt.) Benth. ex Vasey; Uralepis densiflora Buckley; Windsoria stricta Nutt.

Species of plant

Tridens strictus, the longspike tridens, is a species of flowering plant in the grass family Poaceae. It is a perennial reaching 1.7 metres (5 1/2 ft).

It is native to the central and southeastern United States, with a disjunct population in western Pennsylvania. It is a facultative wetland species.
