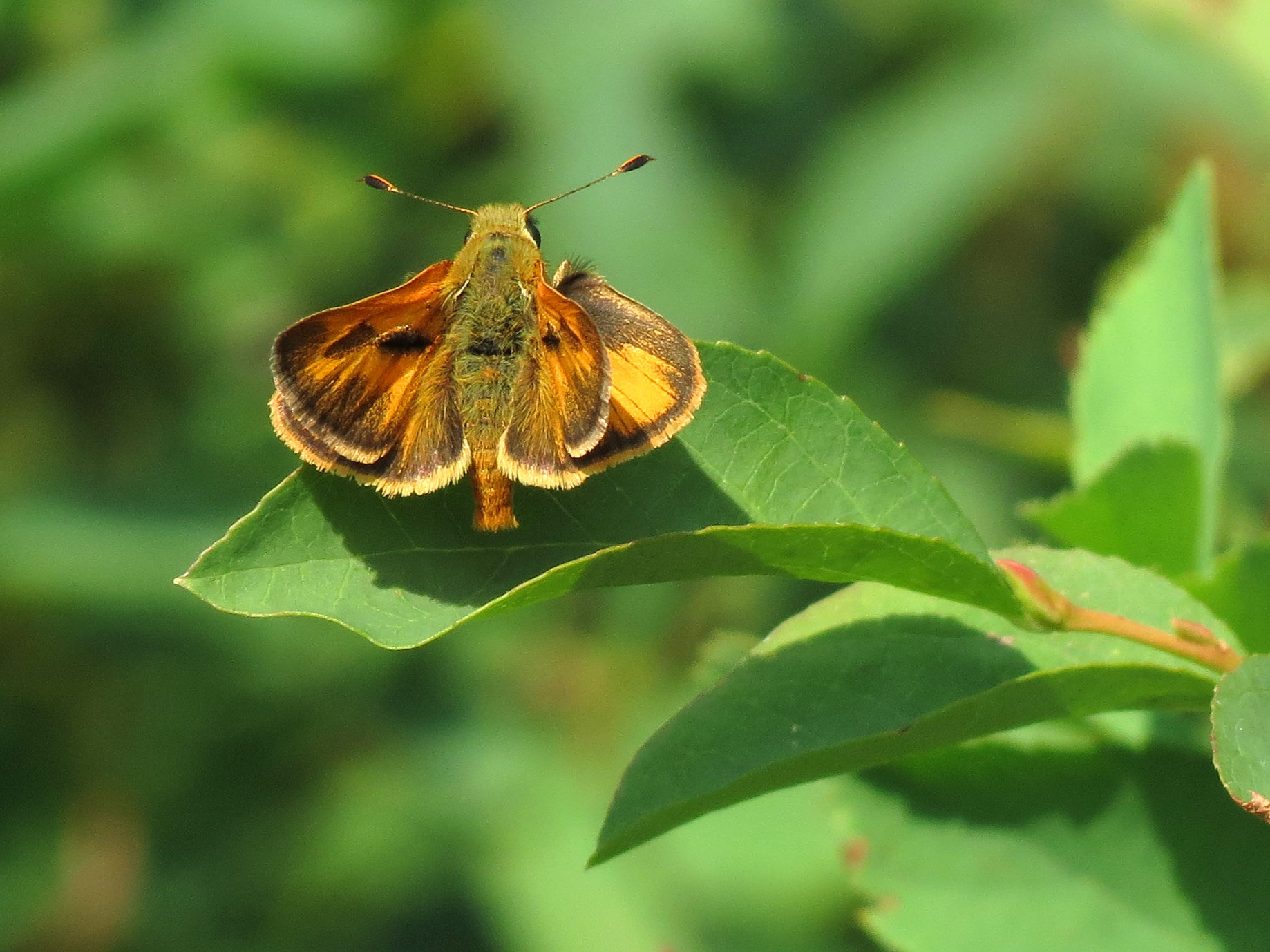

Conservation status
- Apparently Secure (NatureServe)

Scientific classification
- Kingdom: Animalia
- Phylum: Arthropoda
- Class: Insecta
- Order: Lepidoptera
- Family: Hesperiidae
- Genus: Polites
- Species: P. sabuleti

Binomial name
- Polites sabuleti (Boisduval, 1852)

Synonyms
- Hesperia sabuleti Boisduval, 1852; Thymelicus chusca

= Polites sabuleti =

Species of butterfly

Polites sabuleti, the sandhill skipper or saltgrass skipper, is a butterfly in the family Hesperiidae. It is found from southern British Columbia and eastern Washington, south through California and northern Arizona to Baja California and east to south-eastern Wyoming, central Colorado, and north-eastern New Mexico. It is an introduced species in Hawaii.

The wingspan is 22–32 mm. There is one generation with adults on wing from June to August at high elevations. There are several generations from March to October in the southern part of its range and at low elevations.

The larvae feed on various grasses, including Cynodon dactylon, Poa pratensis, Distichlis spicata var. stricta, Eragrostis trichodes, Agrostis scabra, Festuca idahoensis, and Festuca brachyphylla. Adults feed on flower nectar.

== Subspecies ==
- Polites sabuleti sabuleti (California)
- Polites sabuleti tecumseh (Grinnel, 1903) (California)
- Polites sabuleti chusca (Edwards, 1873) (Arizona, California)
- Polites sabuleti margaretae Miller & MacNeill, 1969 (Baja California)
- Polites sabuleti ministigma Scott, 1981 (Colorado)
- Polites sabuleti alkaliensis Austin, 1987 (Nevada, eastern Washington)
- Polites sabuleti albamontana Austin, 1987 (Nevada)
- Polites sabuleti sinemaculata Austin, 1987 (Nevada)
- Polites sabuleti nigrescens Austin, 1987 (Nevada)
- Polites sabuleti basinensis Austin, 1987 (replacement name of Polites sabuleti pallida) (Nevada)
- Polites sabuleti aestivalis Emmel, Emmel & Mattoon, 1998 (California, southern Oregon)
- Polites sabuleti channelensis Emmel & Emmel, 1998 (California)
