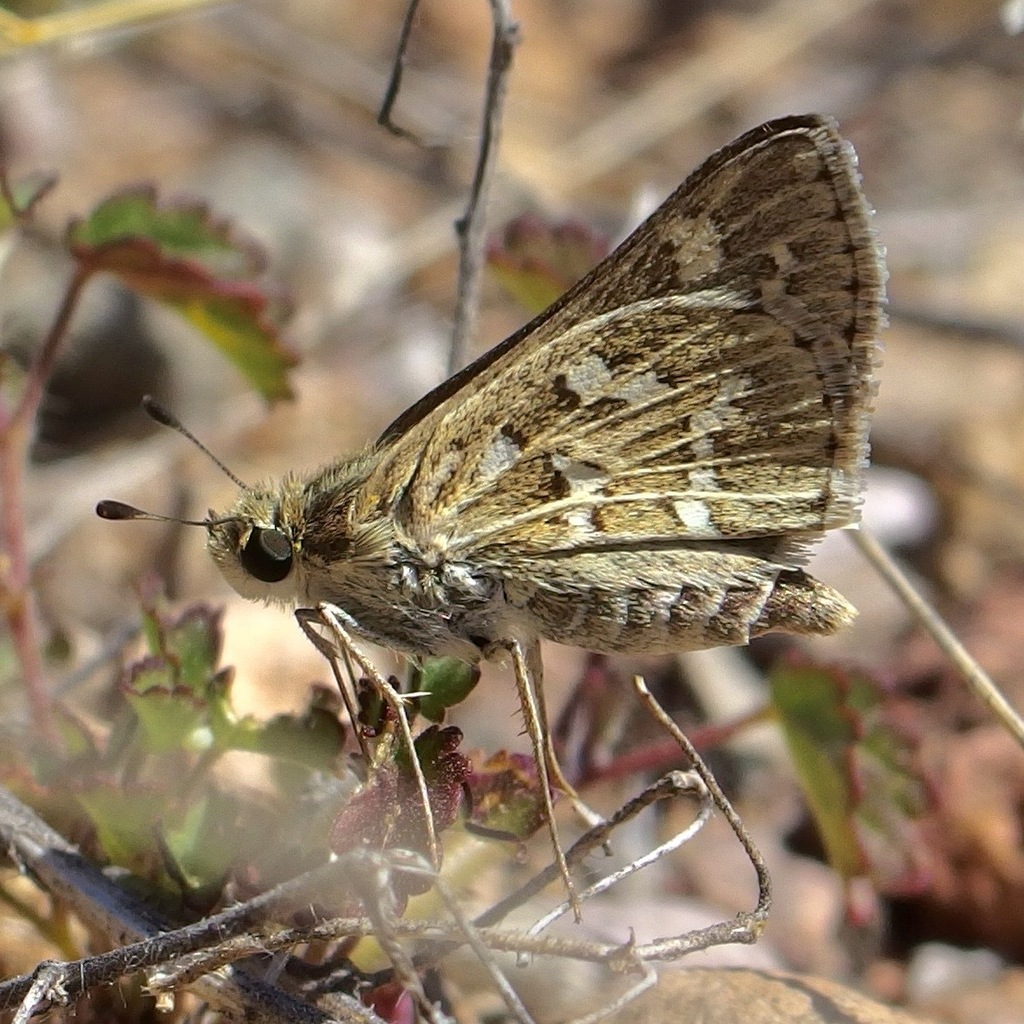

Conservation status
- Apparently Secure (NatureServe)

Scientific classification
- Kingdom: Animalia
- Phylum: Arthropoda
- Class: Insecta
- Order: Lepidoptera
- Family: Hesperiidae
- Genus: Polites
- Species: P. carus

Binomial name
- Polites carus (W. H. Edwards, 1883)

= Polites carus =

Species of butterfly

Polites carus, the carus skipper, is a species of grass skipper in the butterfly family Hesperiidae.

The MONA or Hodges number for Polites carus is 4015.
