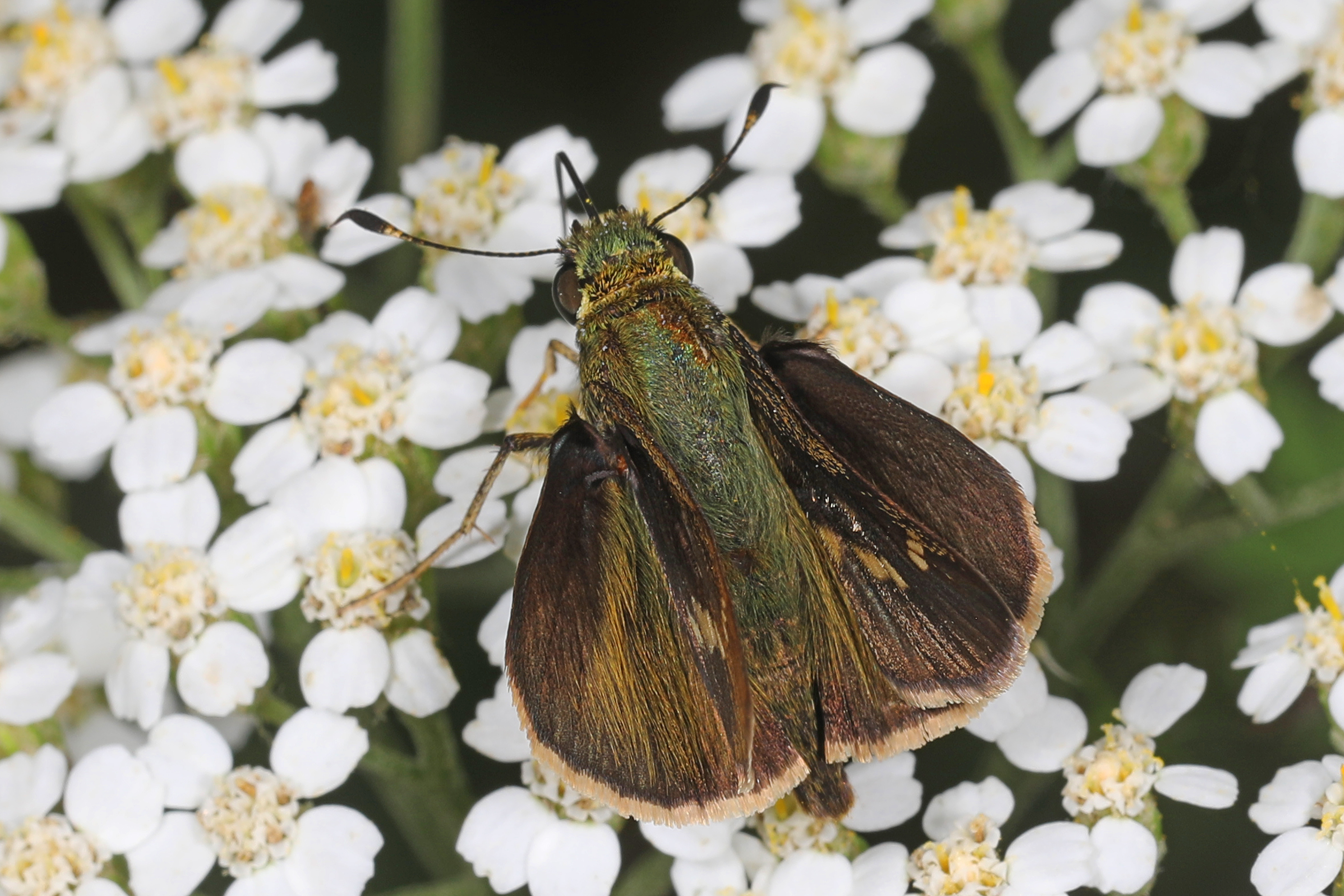
- Vernia verna

Scientific classification
- Kingdom: Animalia
- Phylum: Arthropoda
- Class: Insecta
- Order: Lepidoptera
- Family: Hesperiidae
- Subtribe: Hesperiina
- Genus: Vernia; Grishin, 2019

= Vernia (butterfly) =

Genus of butterflies

Vernia is a small genus of skippers in the family Hesperiidae. The genus was first named in 2019. It contains two species: Vernia dares and Vernia verna. Both species were formerly included in the genus Pompeius.
