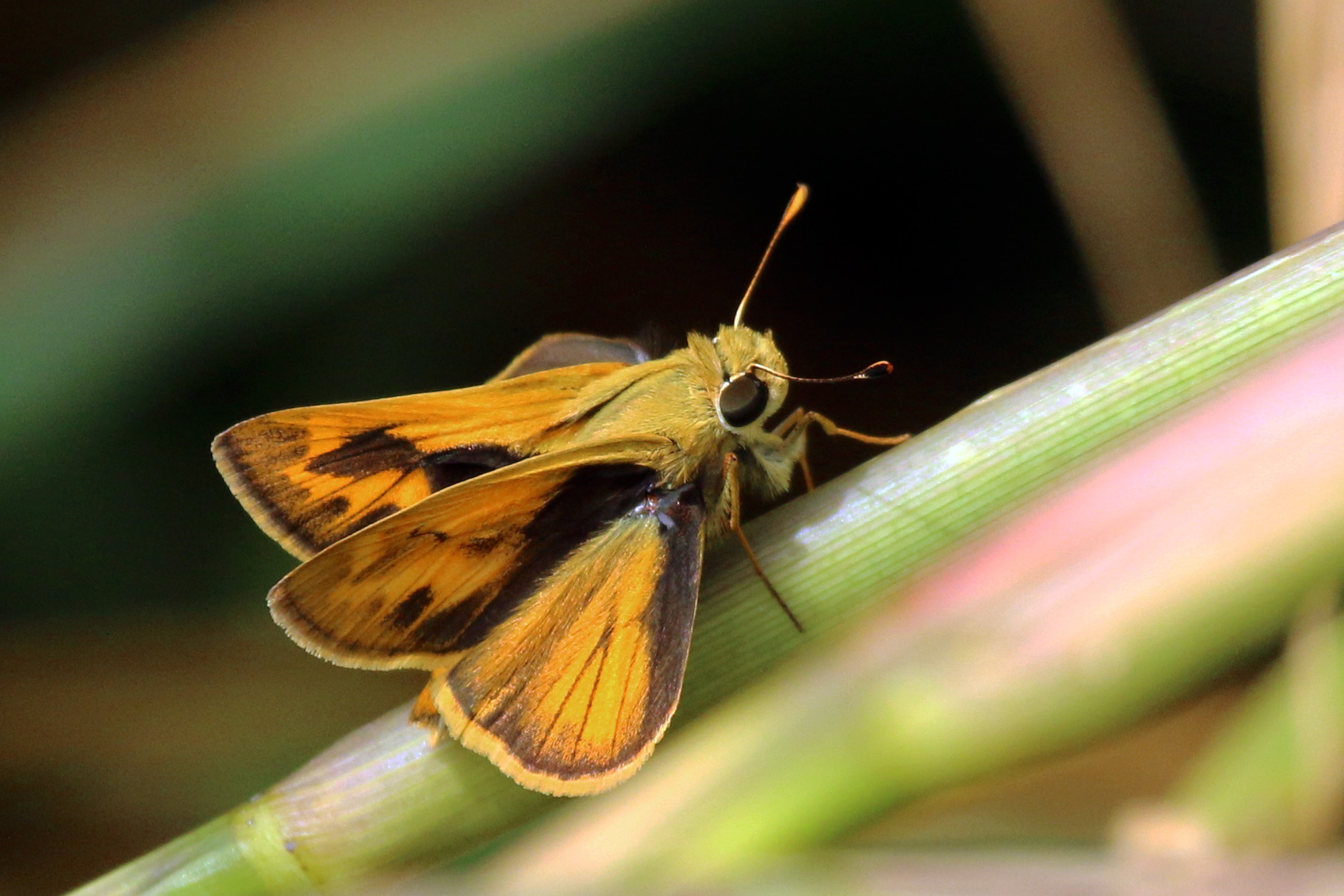
- Male P. v. praeceps, Tobago

Conservation status
- Secure (NatureServe)

Scientific classification
- Kingdom: Animalia
- Phylum: Arthropoda
- Class: Insecta
- Order: Lepidoptera
- Family: Hesperiidae
- Genus: Polites
- Species: P. vibex

Binomial name
- Polites vibex (Geyer, [1832])

Subspecies
- P. s. vibex; P. v. praeceps (Scudder, 1872); P. v. brettoides (Edwards, 1883); P. v. catilina (Plötz, 1886); P. v. dictynna (Godman & Salvin, 1896); P. v. calla Evans, 1955
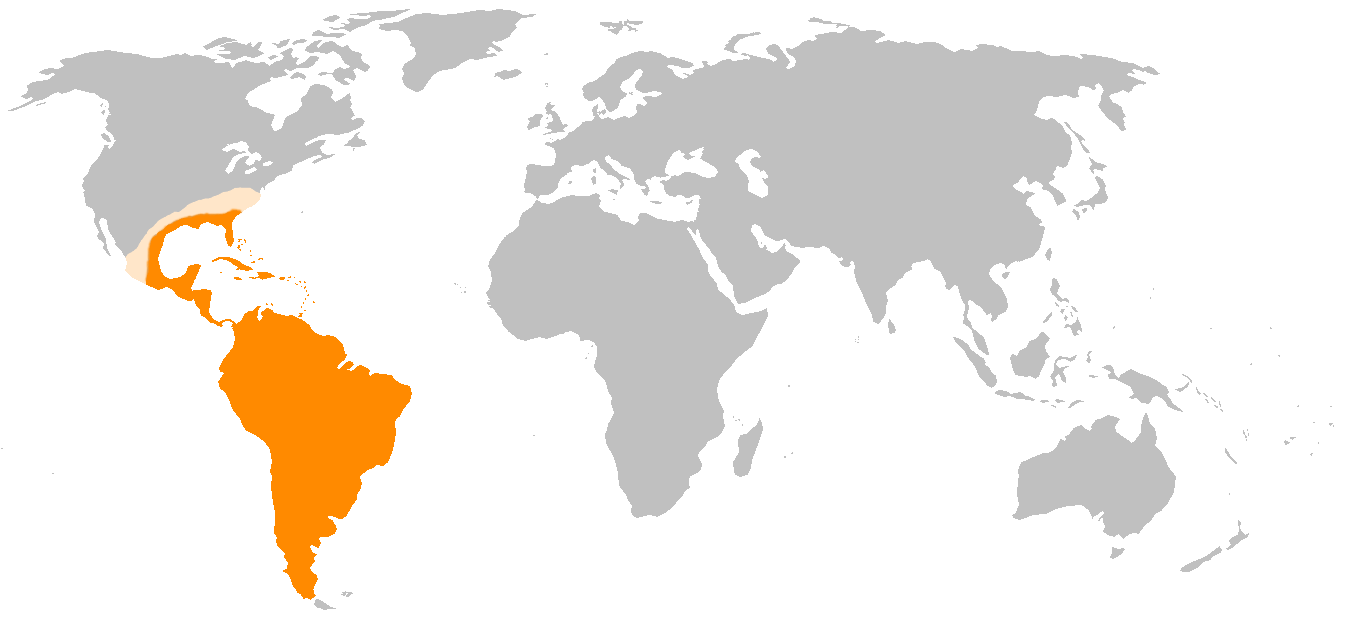
- Year round Migration

Synonyms
- Thymelicus vibex Geyer, [1832]

= Polites vibex =

Whirlabout

Species of butterfly

Polites vibex, or the whirlabout, is a grass skipper in the family Hesperiidae. The whirlabout gets its name from the landing and take off flight patterns of the adult – a circular or vortex or whirling motion. It is resident from the southeastern U.S. and West Indies to eastern Mexico through the tropics down to Argentina. During the warmer North American months, it can sometimes be found as far north as Ohio, Connecticut, and northeast Iowa.

The wingspan is 25–38 mm (0.98–1.50 in). North of the equator, it flies all year and migrates north in late summer and fall.

The larvae feed on grasses mainly at night. Eggs are white and laid one at a time on the host plants.

== Description ==
The whirlabout exhibits sexual dimorphism. Although the two sexes are about the same size with a wingspan of 25–38 mm (0.98–1.50 in), they vary greatly in coloring and pattern. Both have elongated wings but the male is orange and yellow and the female is dark brown.

=== Male ===
From above, the forewing is orange with a black stigma and nearby scales that form a dark, four-sided patch. The forewing also has a jagged black border. The hindwing has a black margin that is smooth inwardly.

From below, the hindwing is golden orange with large, dark, smudged spots.

=== Female ===
From above, the forewing is dark brown with light colored spots. From below, the hindwing is a greyish yellow-brown with a couple of bands of large brown spots and light central patch with dark scales at edges.

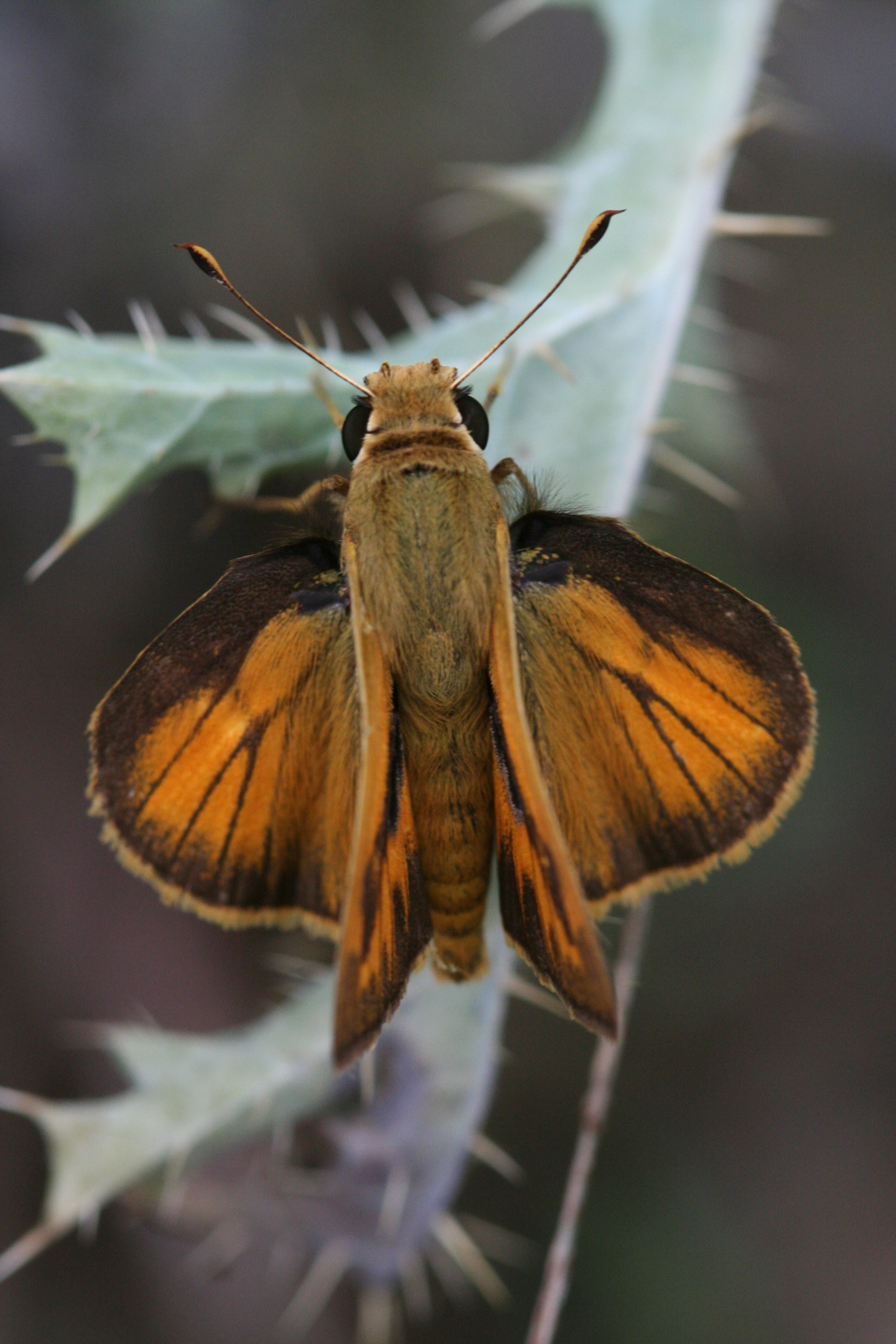
Male

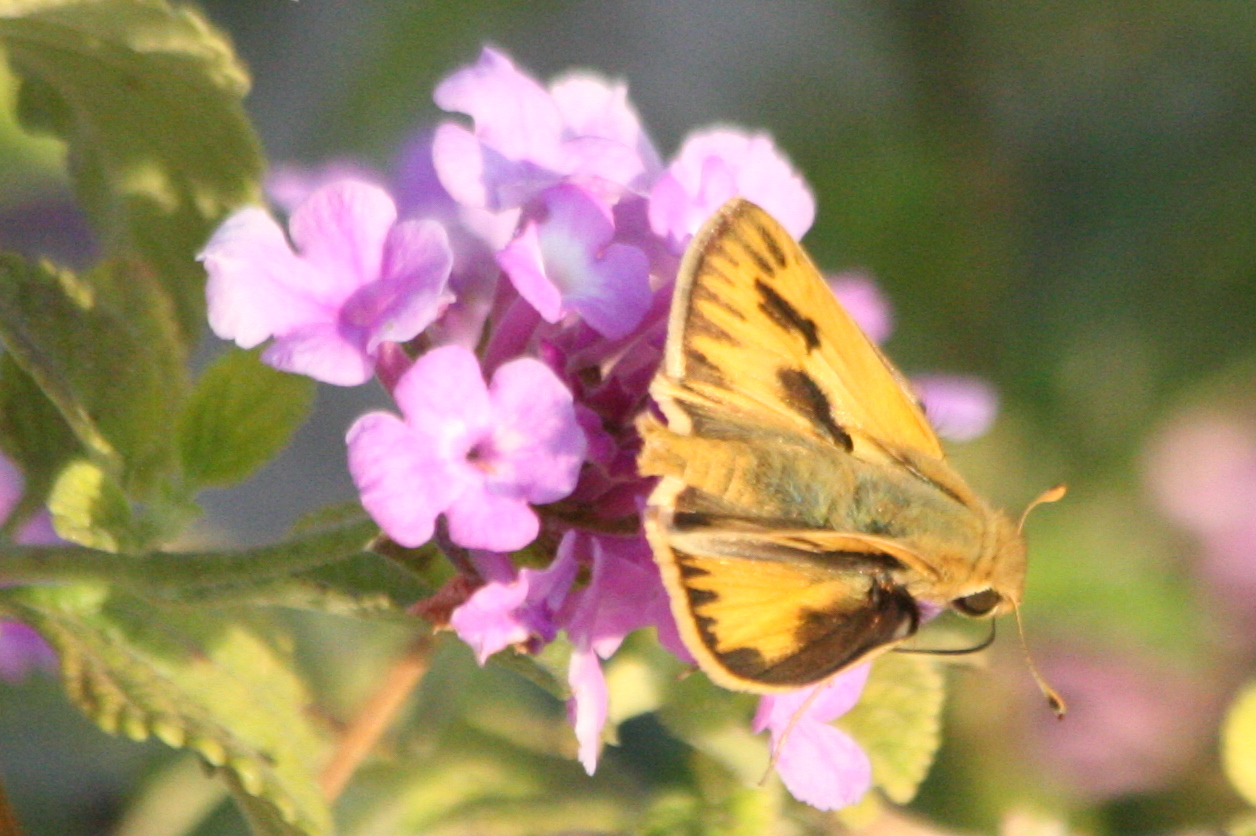
Male

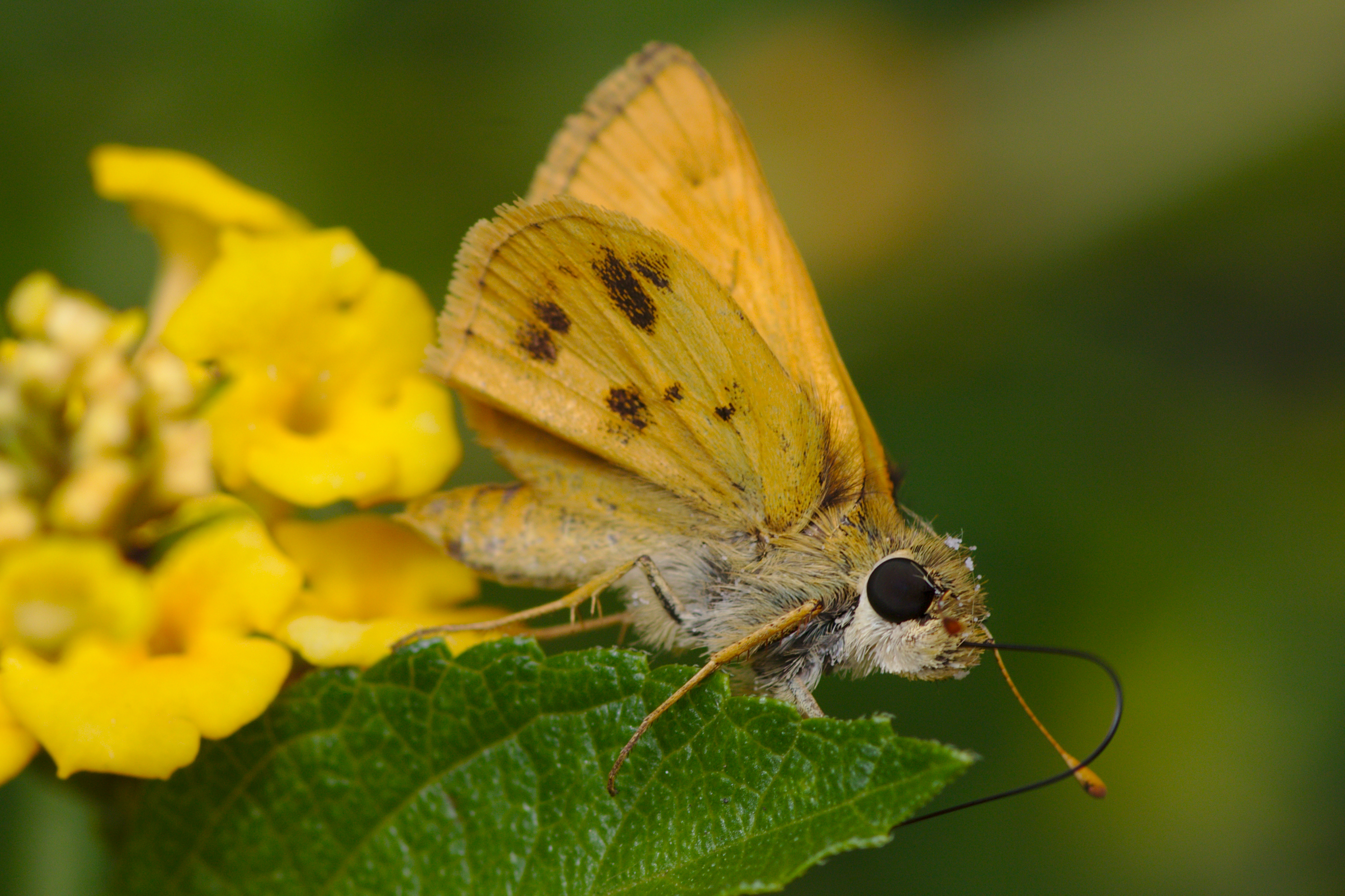
Male

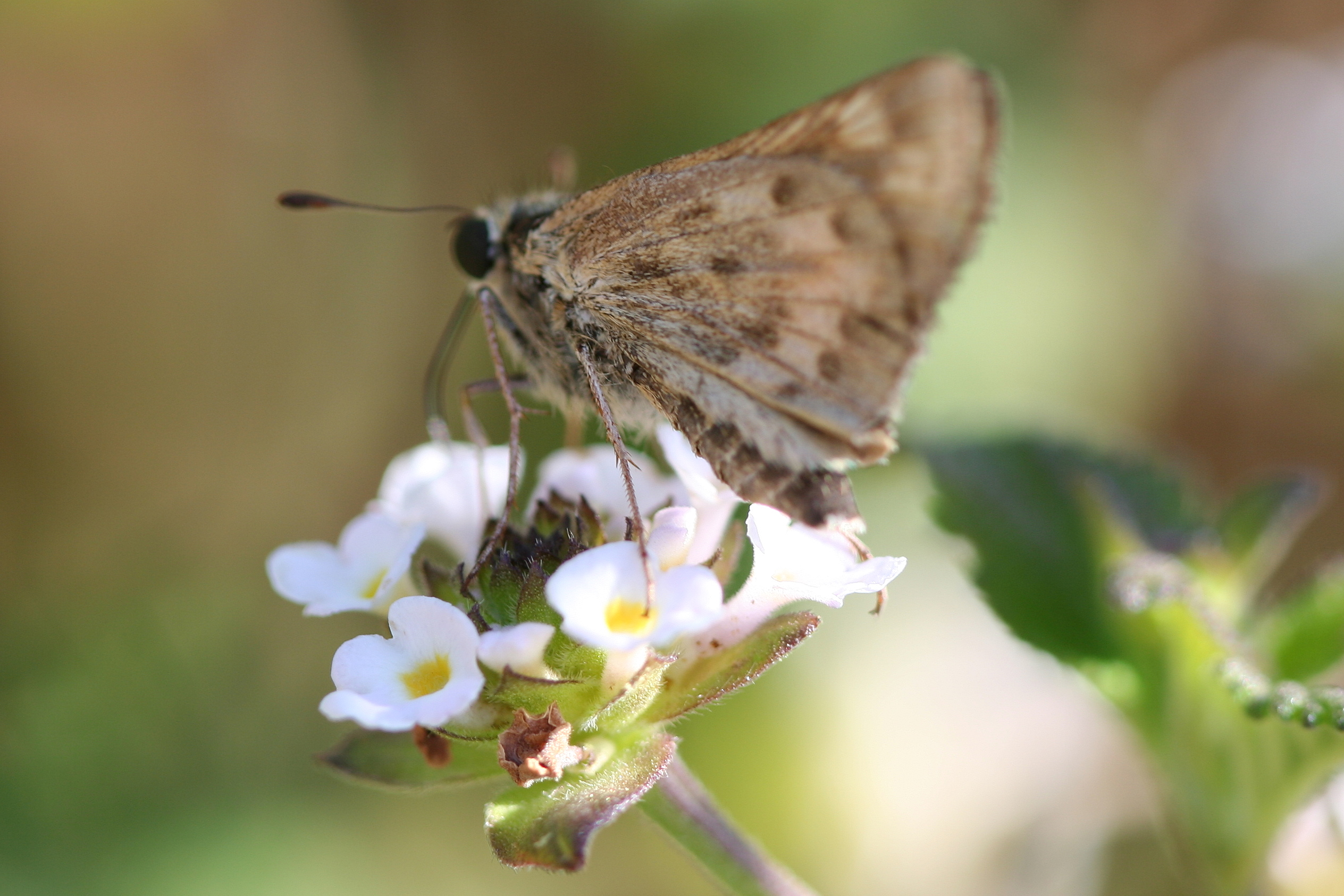
Female

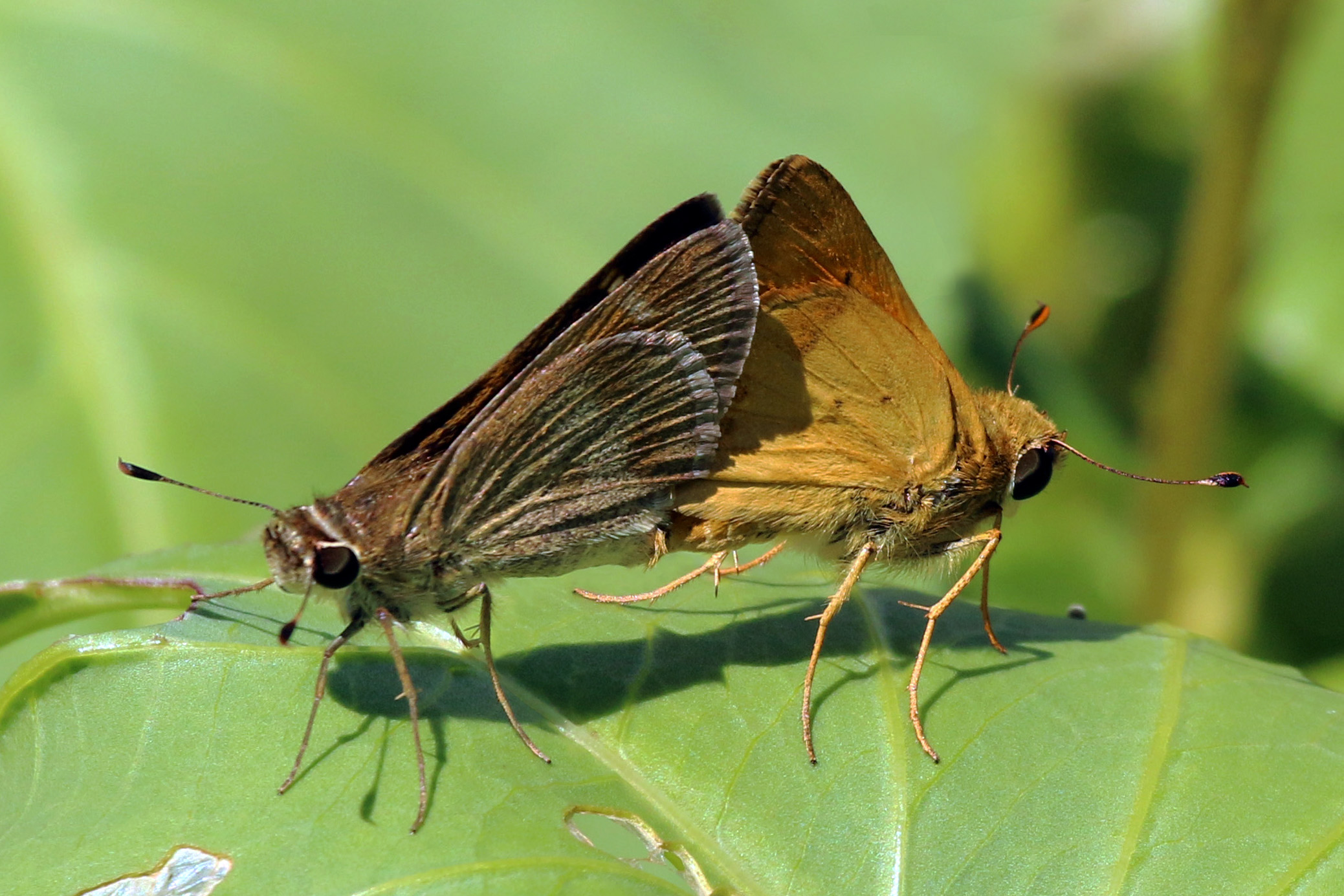
P. v. praeceps mating in Tobago

== Geographic range ==
The whirlabout butterfly is resident from the southeastern U.S. and West Indies to eastern Mexico through the tropics down to Argentina. During the warmer months it can sometimes be found as far north as Ohio, Connecticut, and northeast Iowa.

== Habitat ==
Coastal plain grassy areas, fields, dunes, pinewoods, roadsides, disturbed areas, vacant lots, open woodlots, forest edges, parks, lawns, and gardens.

== Food resources ==
Caterpillars eat various grasses. Adults eat the nectar of flowers.
