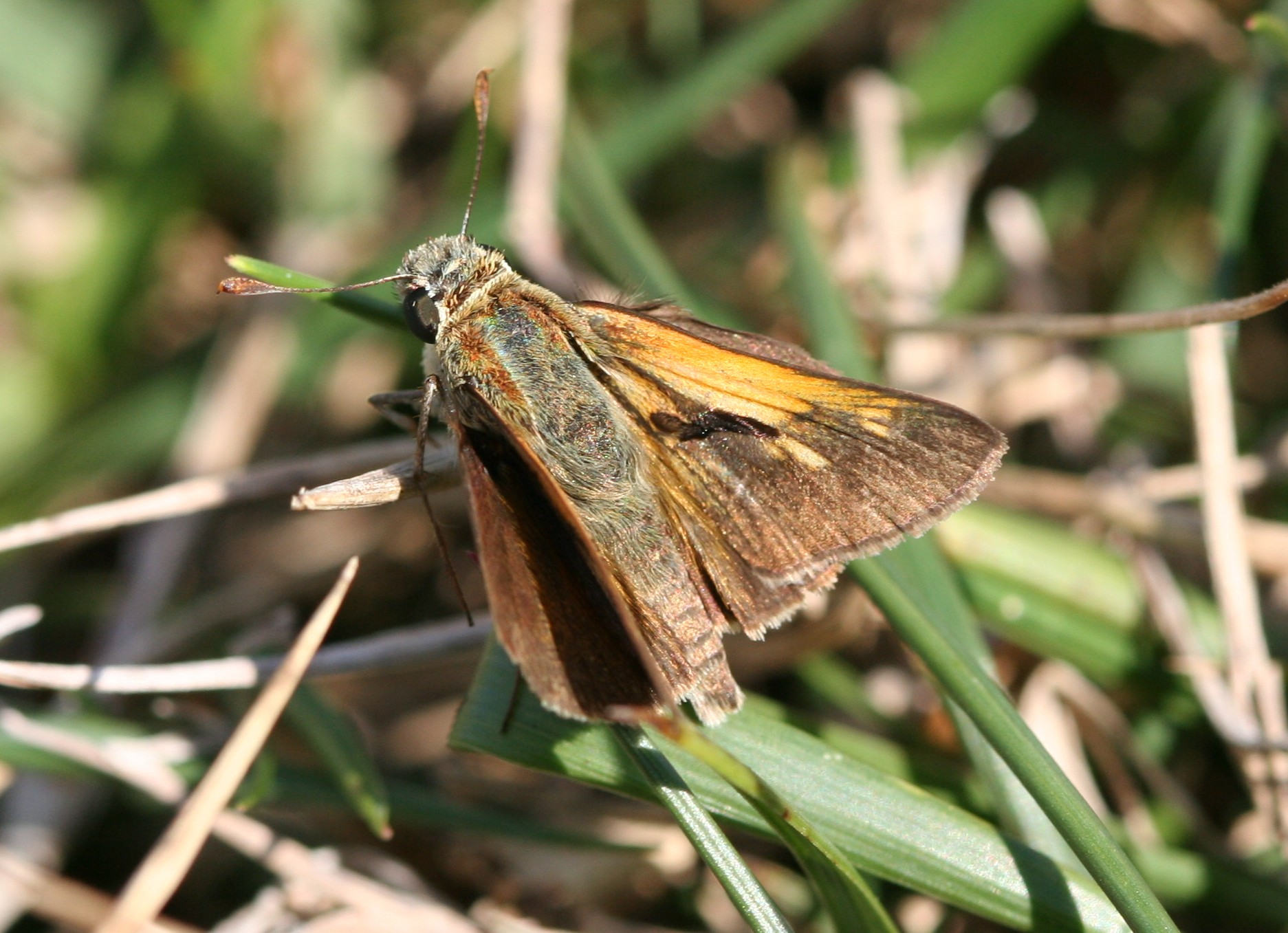
- Tawny-edged skipper (Polites themistocles), male

Scientific classification
- Kingdom: Animalia
- Phylum: Arthropoda
- Clade: Pancrustacea
- Class: Insecta
- Order: Lepidoptera
- Family: Hesperiidae
- Subfamily: Hesperiinae
- Genus: Polites; Scudder, 1872

Synonyms
- Hedone (Scudder, 1872); Limochores (Scudder, 1872); Poanopsis (Godman, 1900); Pyrrhosidia (Scudder, 1874); Yvretta (Hemming, 1935)

= Polites (butterfly) =

Genus of butterflies

Polites is a genus of North American butterflies of the family Hesperiidae (skippers), subfamily Hesperiinae (grass skippers).

== Species ==
Listed alphabetically within groups:

The themistocles species group:

- Polites draco (W.H. Edwards, 1871) – draco skipper
- Polites mardon (W.H. Edwards, 1881) – Mardon skipper, Cascades skipper or little Oregon skipper
- Polites norae MacNeill, 1993
- Polites peckius (W. Kirby, 1837) – Peck's skipper or yellowpatch skipper
- Polites sabuleti (Boisduval, 1852) – sandhill skipper or saltgrass skipper
- Polites themistocles (Latreille, 1824) – tawny-edged skipper

The origenes species group:

- Polites mystic (W.H. Edwards, 1863) – long dash skipper
- Polites origenes (Fabricius, 1793) – crossline skipper
- Polites pupillus (Plötz, 1882)
- Polites puxillius (Mabille, 1891)
- Polites sonora (Scudder, 1872) – Sonoran skipper

The rhesus species group:

- Polites carus (Edwards, 1883) – desert gray skipper, Carus skipper
- Polites rhesus (W.H. Edwards, 1878) – Rhesus skipper
- Polites subreticulata (Plötz, 1883)

The vibex species group:

- Polites vibex (Geyer, [1832]) – whirlabout

Unnamed species group:

- Polites baracoa (Lucas, 1857) – Baracoa skipper
- Polites bittiae Lindsey, 1925
- Polites vibicoides de Jong, 1983
