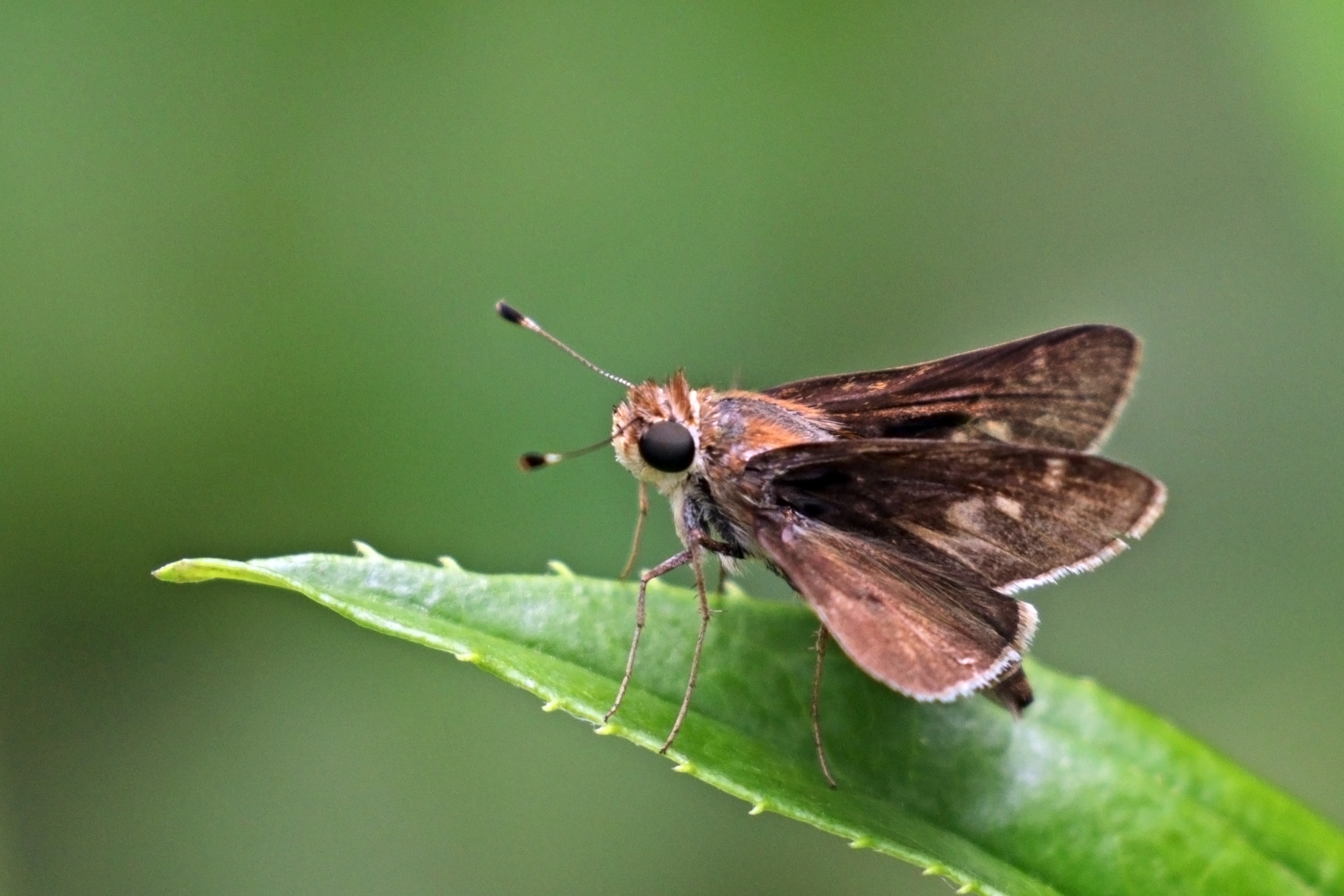

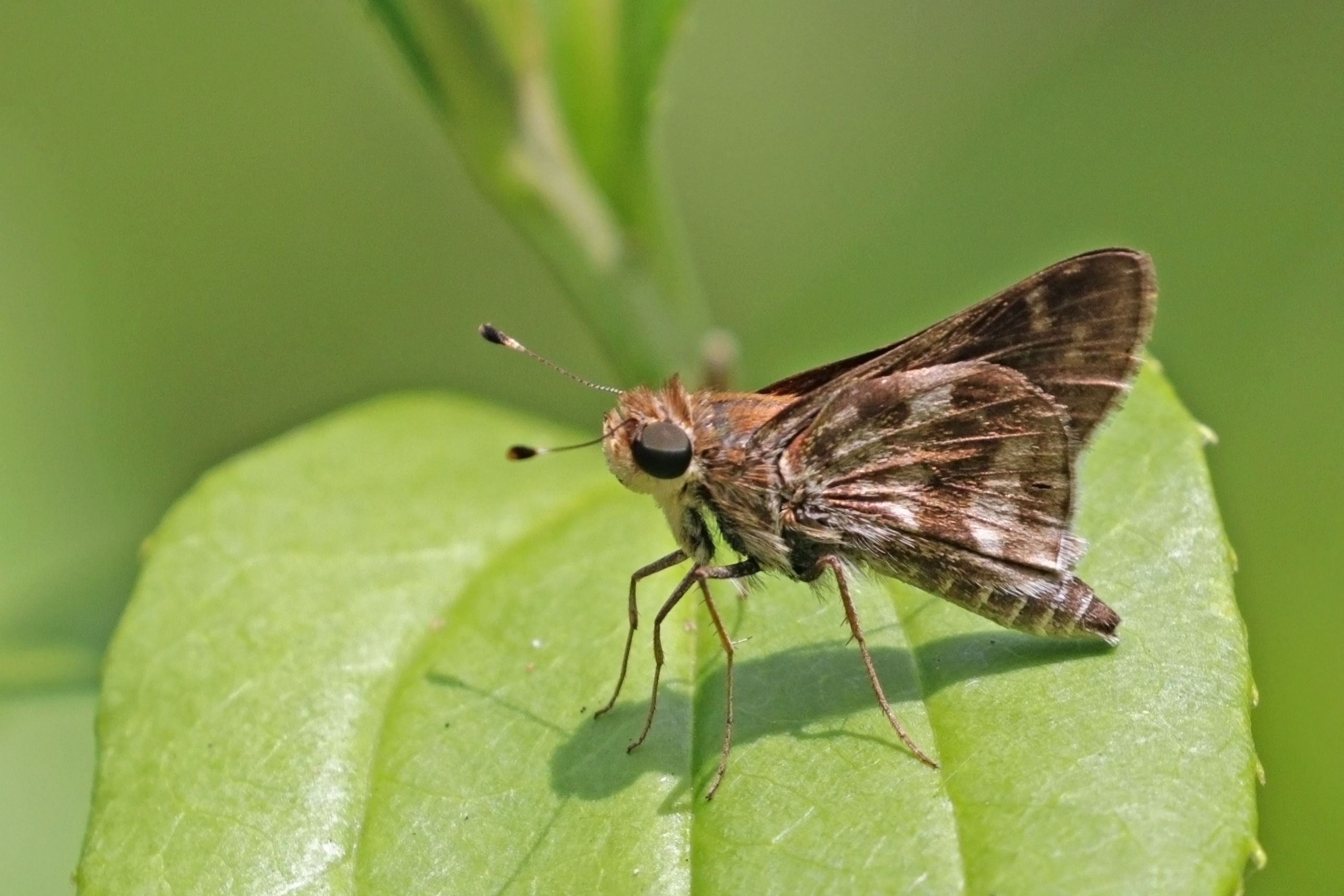
- Both P. pompeius in Panama

Scientific classification
- Kingdom: Animalia
- Phylum: Arthropoda
- Clade: Pancrustacea
- Class: Insecta
- Order: Lepidoptera
- Family: Hesperiidae
- Subtribe: Hesperiina
- Genus: Pompeius; Evans, 1955

= Pompeius (butterfly) =

Genus of butterflies

Pompeius is a genus of skippers in the family Hesperiidae.

== Species ==
- Pompeius amblyspila (Mabille, 1897)
- Pompeius darina Evans, 1955
- Pompeius pompeius (Latreille, [1824])
- Pompeius postpuncta (Draudt, 1923)

=== Former species ===
- Pompeius dares (Plötz, 1883) - transferred to Vernia dares (Plötz, 1883)
- Pompeius verna (Edwards, 1862) - transferred to Vernia verna (Edwards, 1862)
