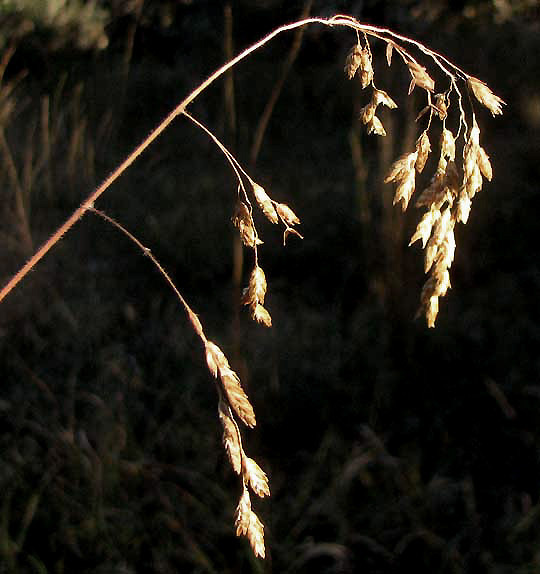
- Tridens texanus, drooping inflorescence.

Scientific classification
- Kingdom: Plantae
- Clade: Tracheophytes
- Clade: Angiosperms
- Clade: Monocots
- Clade: Commelinids
- Order: Poales
- Family: Poaceae
- Subfamily: Chloridoideae
- Genus: Tridens
- Species: T. texanus

Binomial name
- Tridens texanus (S.Watson) Nash

Synonyms
- Sieglingia texana (S.Watson) Kuntze; Triodia texana S.Watson Tricuspis texana; Thurb. ex S.Watson

= Tridens texanus =

Species of plant

Tridens texanus, often called Texas fluffgrass and Texas tridens, is a species of grass belonging to the family Poaceae.

== Description ==
Species of the New World genus Tridens are similar to many other grass species developing panicle-type inflorescences. However, certain features -- often hard to see without magnification and knowledge of basic grass-flower anatomy -- help identify Tridens species:

- Spikelets are not compressed laterally, or sideways, but rather are plump to rounded in cross-section; they accommodate 3 or more florets.
- The lemma's 3 prominent veins are hairy, at least below, while the glumes are hairless.
- Neither glumes nor lemmas bear needlelike awns at their tips.

These features help distinguish Tridens texanus from other Tridens species:

- The panicle-type inflorescence is open and diffuse, not spike-like.
- Of the lemma's 3 nerves, the ones on the sides vanish at the margin instead of continuing strongly to the edges.
- The spikelets are relatively large, up to 10 mm long.

== Distribution ==
In the USA, Tridens texanus occurs in the south-central states of New Mexico and Texas.

In Mexico, Tridens texanus occurs in the northern states of Chihuahua, Coahuila, Nuevo León, San Luis Potosí and Tamaulipas.

== Habitat ==
In Texas, Tridens texanus is described as inhabiting brushlands. In the Southwestern Plains, it's reported to occur infrequently on rocky limestone soils. Pictures on this page show an individual encountered on a limestone hill slope in an opening of Ashe Juniper forest.

In Mexico, a study of the grasses in a mesquite woodland in north-central Nuevo León state found Tridens texanus to be the fourth most frequently documented grass species, appearing in about 13% of sampled sites. More frequently occurring companion species, in descending order, were Cenchrus ciliaris (as Pennisetum cilare), Setaria texana, and Bouteloua trifida Also in Mexico the species has been collected at the edge of a field.

== Taxonomy ==
In 1883, when Sereno Watson first described Tridens texanus as Triodia texana, he noted collections by Wright from Western Texas and New Mexico, and in Mexico at Monclova, Coahuila.

=== Phylogeny ===
Molecular phylogenetic analysis confirms Tridens texanus as a member of the strict concept of the genus Tridens, and belonging to the subtribe Pappophorinae.

=== Etymology ===
The genus name Tridens is New Latin meaning "3-toothed," referring to the lemmas of florets of the type specimen upon which the genus was described in 1817 where, at least to the authors, the lemma's three veins appeared to gather at a notched or 2-toothed tip. The name is constructed from the Latin and Greek tri-, meaning "having 3 elements or parts." and the Latin -dēns, meaning "tooth or toothlike part.

The species name texanus refers to the US state of Texas, collections from which were examined when, in 1883, Sereno Watson described the taxon which would become Tridens texanus.

== Gallery ==
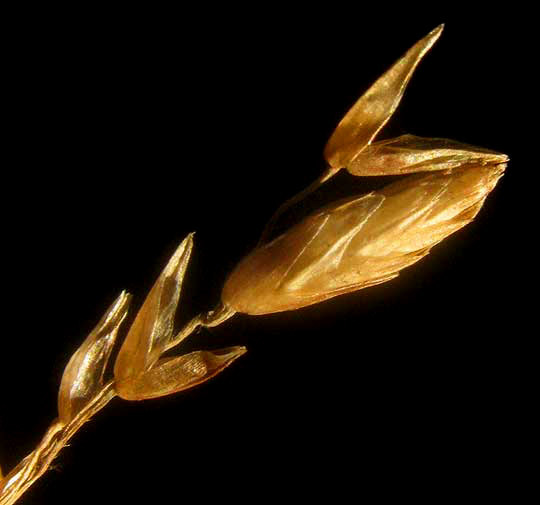
Tridens texanus spikelets shedding their mature florets

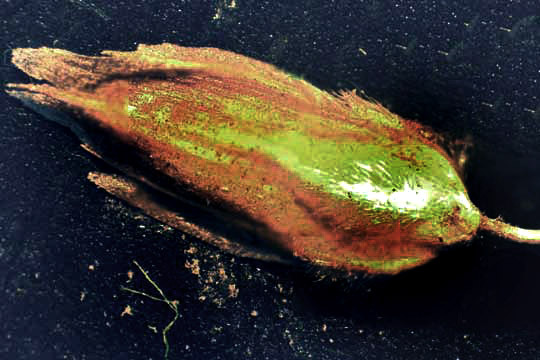
Tridens texanus floret with hairy lower veins, and maybe a brown and maybe a brown fungal rust

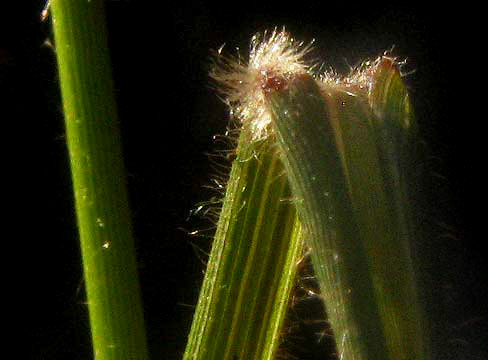
Tridens texanus ligule and hairy blade bases

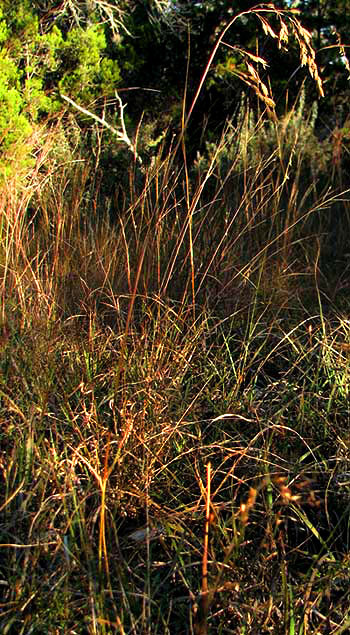
Tridens texanus in habitat
