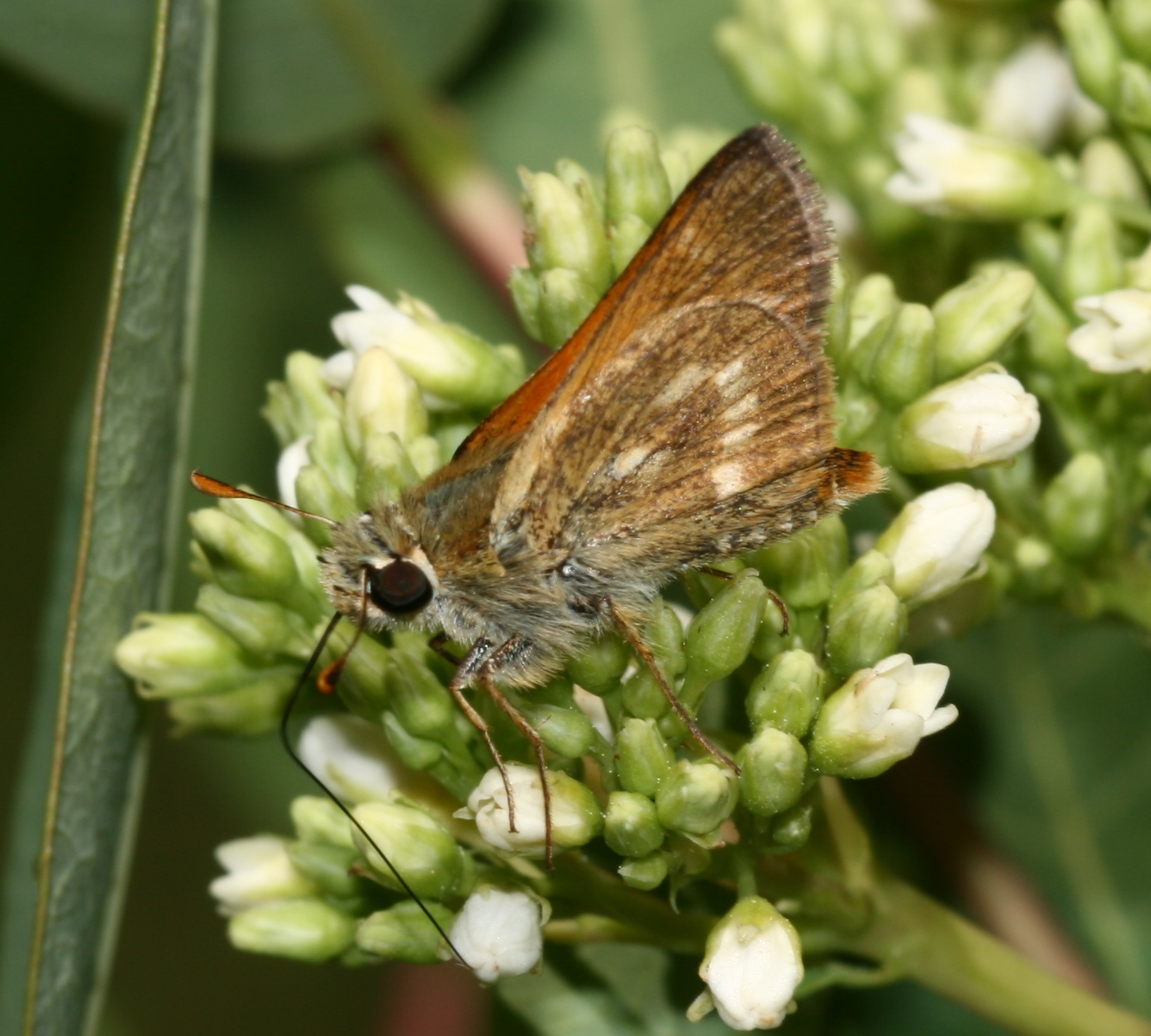

Conservation status
- Apparently Secure (NatureServe)

Scientific classification
- Kingdom: Animalia
- Phylum: Arthropoda
- Clade: Pancrustacea
- Class: Insecta
- Order: Lepidoptera
- Family: Hesperiidae
- Genus: Polites
- Species: P. sonora

Binomial name
- Polites sonora (Scudder, 1872)

Synonyms
- Ochlodes sonora Scudder, 1872

= Polites sonora =

Species of butterfly

Polites sonora, the Sonoran skipper or western long dash, is a butterfly in the family Hesperiidae. It is found along the Pacific coast of the U.S., reaching Canada only in the extreme southern interior of British Columbia.

The wingspan is 25–27 mm.

There is one generation in Canada from mid-July to mid-August in British Columbia.

The larvae feed on grasses, possibly Idaho fescue (Festuca idahoensis). Adults feed on nectar from flowers including white-flowered thistles.

== Subspecies ==
- P. s. sonora
- P. s. siris (Edwards, 1881) – Dog Star skipper
- P. s. utahensis (Skinner, 1911)
- P. s. flaviventris Austin, 1998
