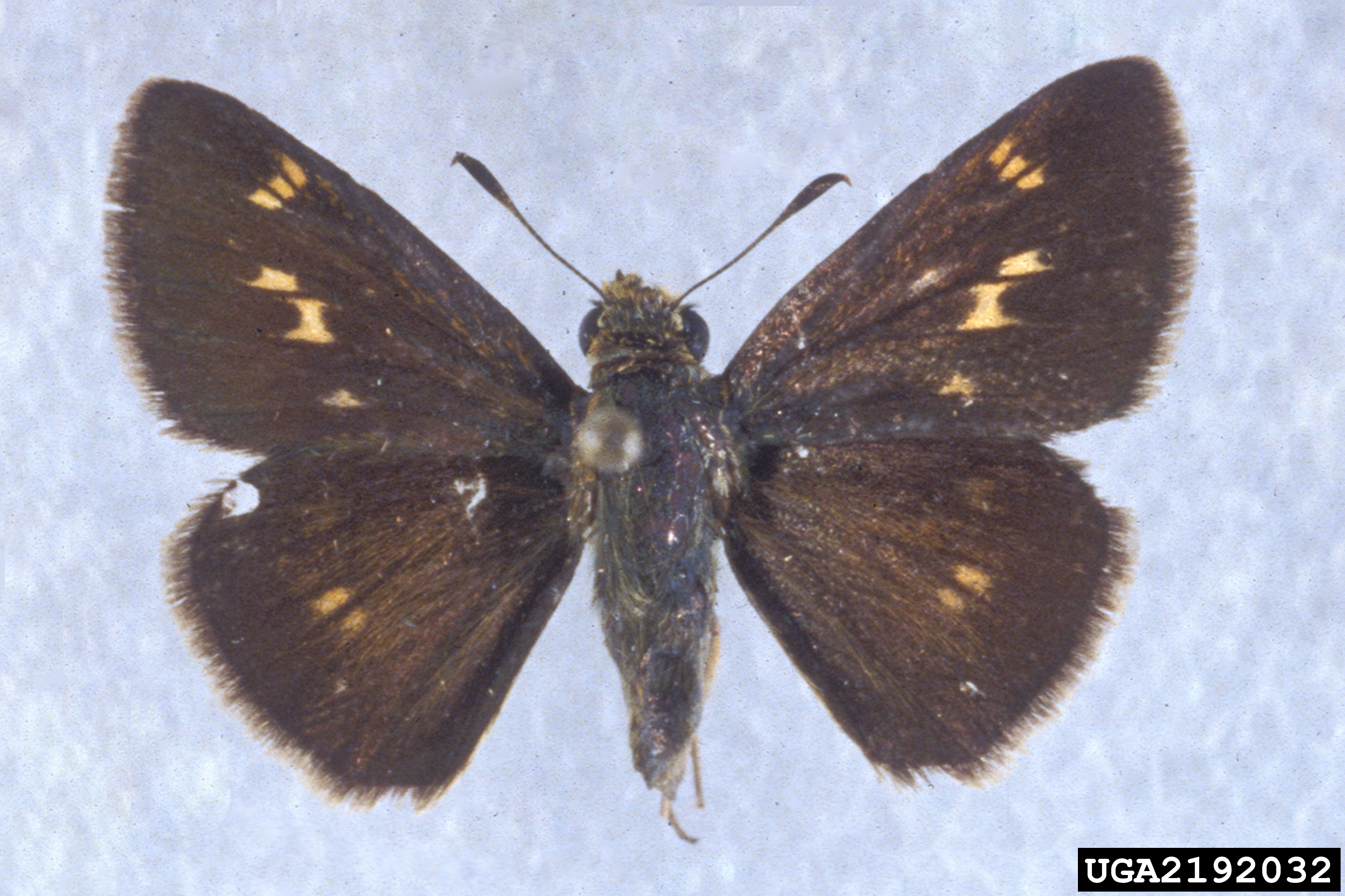

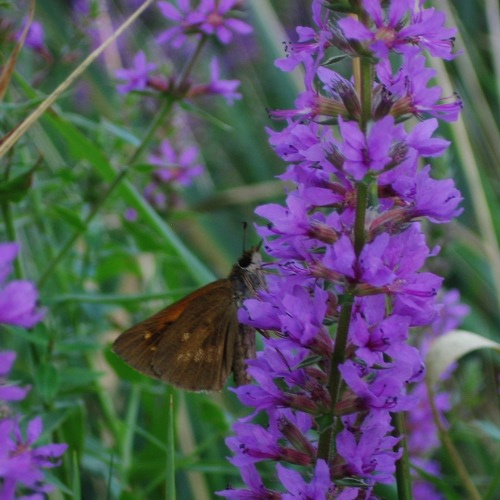

Conservation status
- Secure (NatureServe)

Scientific classification
- Kingdom: Animalia
- Phylum: Arthropoda
- Class: Insecta
- Order: Lepidoptera
- Family: Hesperiidae
- Genus: Polites
- Species: P. origenes

Binomial name
- Polites origenes (Fabricius, 1793)

Subspecies
- P. o. origenes; P. o. rhena (Edwards, 1878)

Synonyms
- Limochores origenes Fabricius, 1793; Hesperia origenes Fabricius, 1793; Hesperia manataaqua Scudder, 1863; Limochroes manataagua Dyar, 1903; Polites manataaqua

= Polites origenes =

Crossline skipper

Species of butterfly

Polites origenes, the crossline skipper, is a butterfly in the family Hesperiidae. It is found in the eastern United States, excepting Florida, southern Ontario, and Quebec.

The wingspan is 23–30 mm.

There is one generation in Canada from late June into mid-August, with two in the U.S.

The larvae feed on grasses, including redtop grass (Tridens flavus) and little bluestem (Andropogon scoparius). Adults feed on flower nectar.
