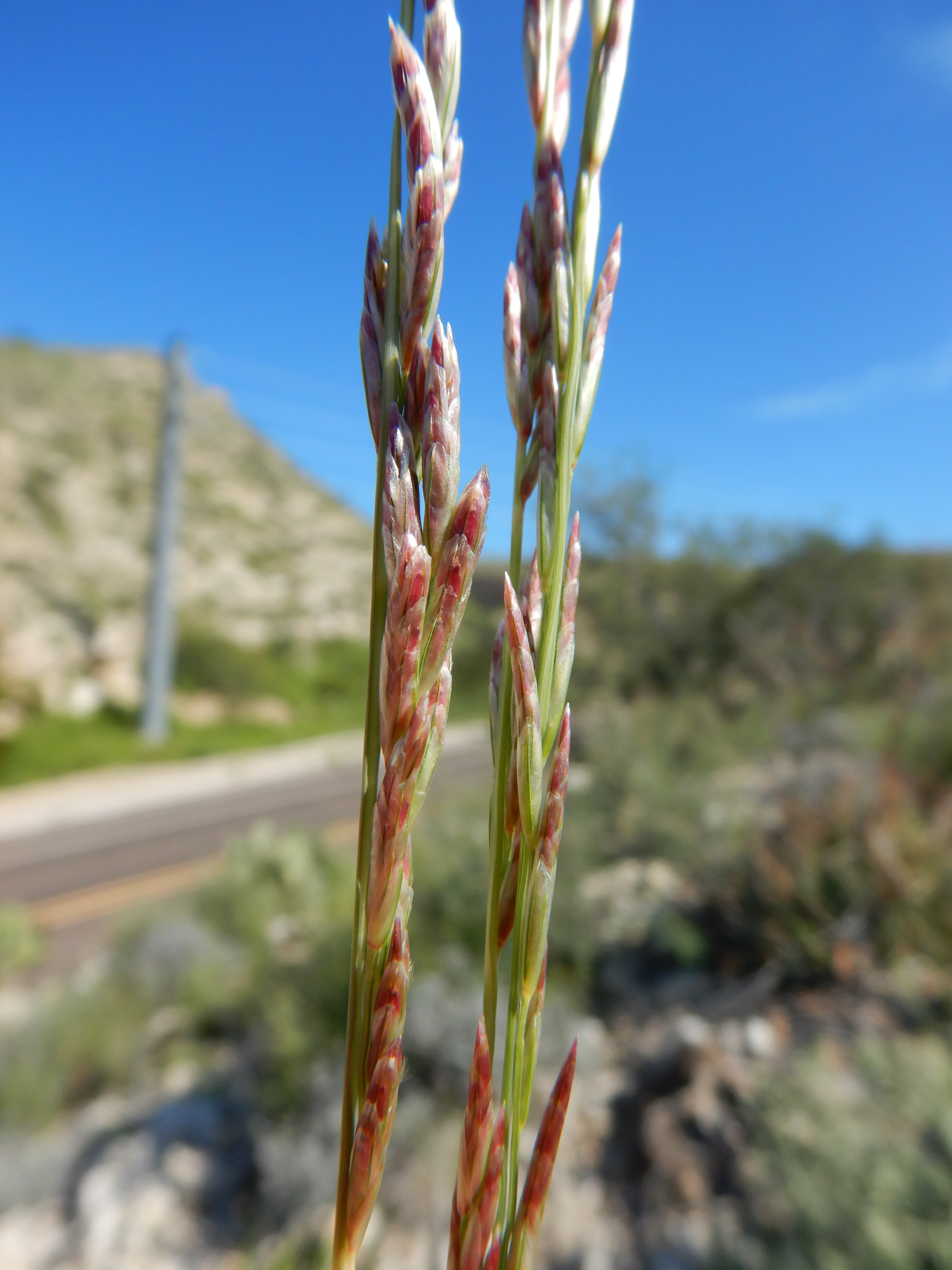

Conservation status
- Secure (NatureServe)

Scientific classification
- Kingdom: Plantae
- Clade: Tracheophytes
- Clade: Angiosperms
- Clade: Monocots
- Clade: Commelinids
- Order: Poales
- Family: Poaceae
- Subfamily: Chloridoideae
- Genus: Tridentopsis
- Species: T. mutica

Binomial name
- Tridentopsis mutica (Torr.) P.M.Peterson

Synonyms
- Sieglingia mutica (Torr.) Kuntze; Sieglingia trinerviglumis Kuntze, nom. nud.; Tricuspis mutica Torr. (1857) (basionym); Tricuspis pilosa A.Heller; Tricuspis trinerviglumis Munro ex A.Gray, nom. nud.; Tridens muticus (Torr.) Nash; Triodia mutica (Torr.) Scribn.; Triodia trinerviglumis Benth. ex Vasey, nom. nud.; Tridens muticus f. effusus M.C.Johnst.; Tridens pilosus (A.Heller) Hitchc.; Uralepis pilosa Buckley, nom. illeg.

= Tridentopsis mutica =

Species of flowering plant

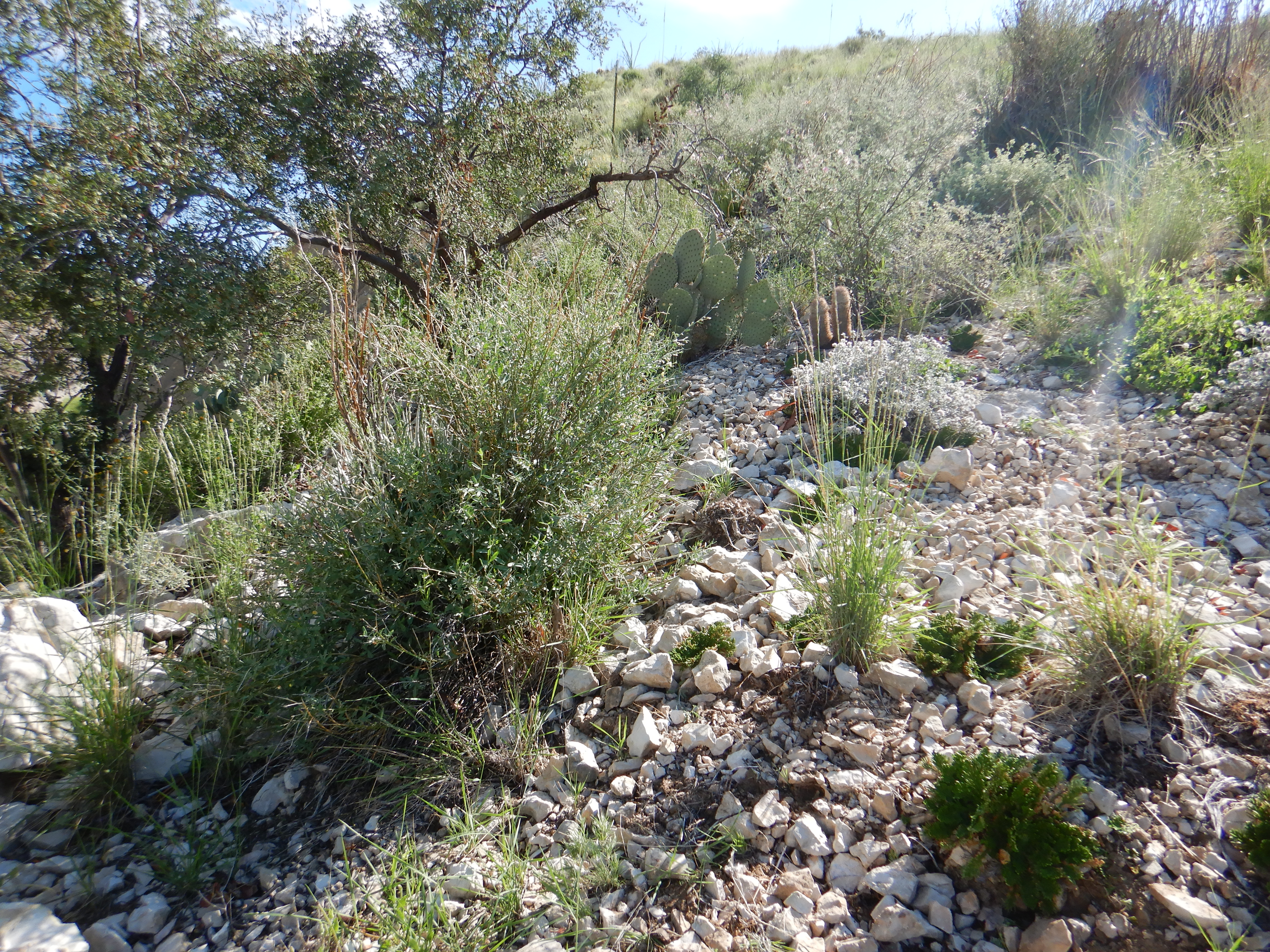

Tridentopsis mutica is a New World species of grass known by the common name slim tridens.

== Description ==
It is a perennial grass forming a thick tuft with a knotted base and rhizome. It reaches a maximum height of 50 to 80 centimetres (20 to 31 in). The panicle has short branches appressed to the others, making the inflorescence narrow. The florets are generally purple in color.

This plant uses C4 carbon fixation as its method of energy metabolism.

== Distribution and habitat ==
It is native to northern Mexico and the southwestern and south-central United States.

It grows in several types of habitat, including plateau and desert, woodlands, sagebrush, plains, and other areas with dry sandy and clay soils.
