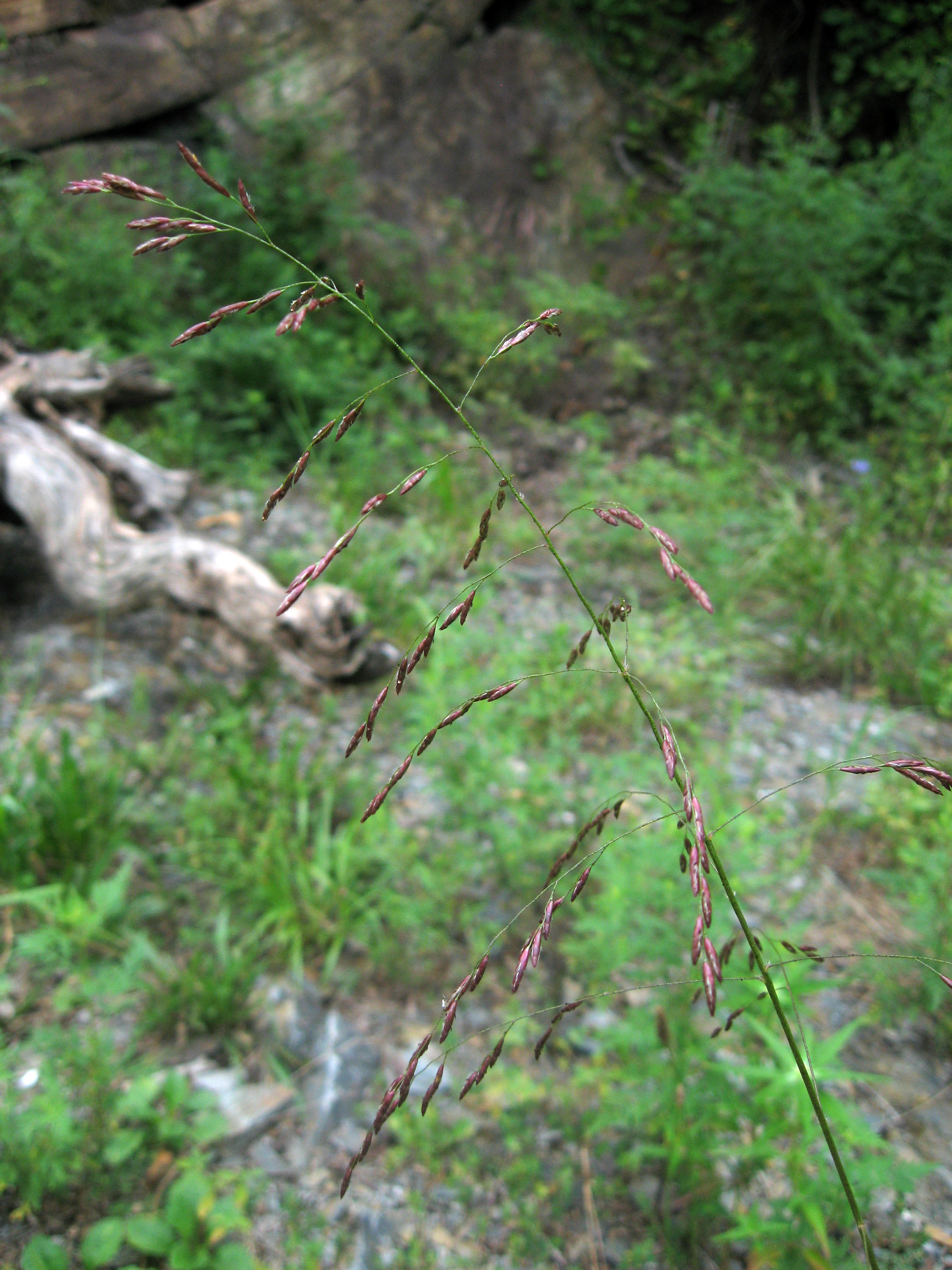

Scientific classification
- Kingdom: Plantae
- Clade: Tracheophytes
- Clade: Angiosperms
- Clade: Monocots
- Clade: Commelinids
- Order: Poales
- Family: Poaceae
- Subfamily: Chloridoideae
- Genus: Tridens
- Species: T. flavus

Binomial name
- Tridens flavus (L.) A.S.Hitchc.

= Tridens flavus =

Species of grass

Tridens flavus, known as purpletop, purpletop tridens, tall redtop, greasy grass, and grease grass, is a large, robust perennial bunchgrass.

The seeds are purple, giving the grass its common name. The seeds are also oily, leading to its other common name, "grease grass". It reproduces by seed and tillers.

The grass is often confused with the similar looking Johnson grass (Sorghum halepense), although it is only distantly related. Tridens flavus is easily distinguished by its short, hairy ligule.

Native to eastern North America, it is widespread throughout its range and is most often found in man-made habitats, such as hay meadows and lawns.

It is a larval host to the common wood nymph, crossline skipper, little glassywing, and the Zabulon skipper.

== Gallery ==
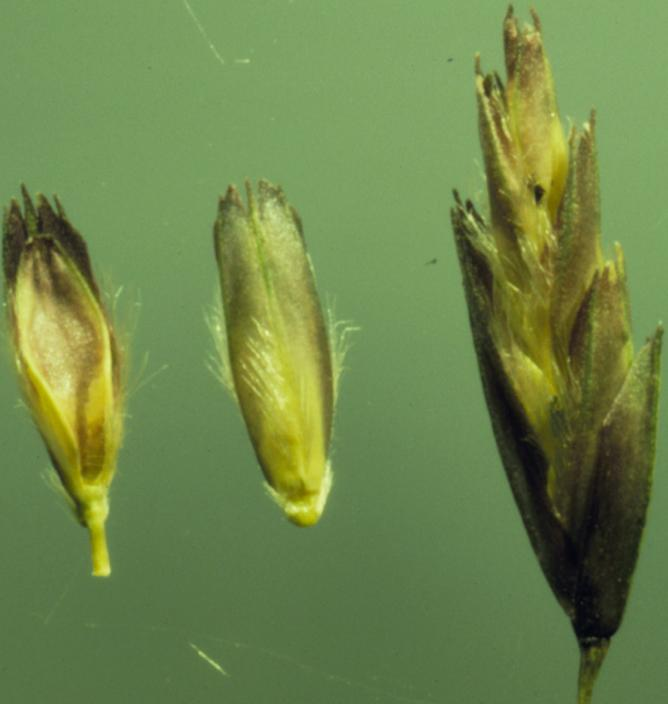
Individual florets and spikelet
