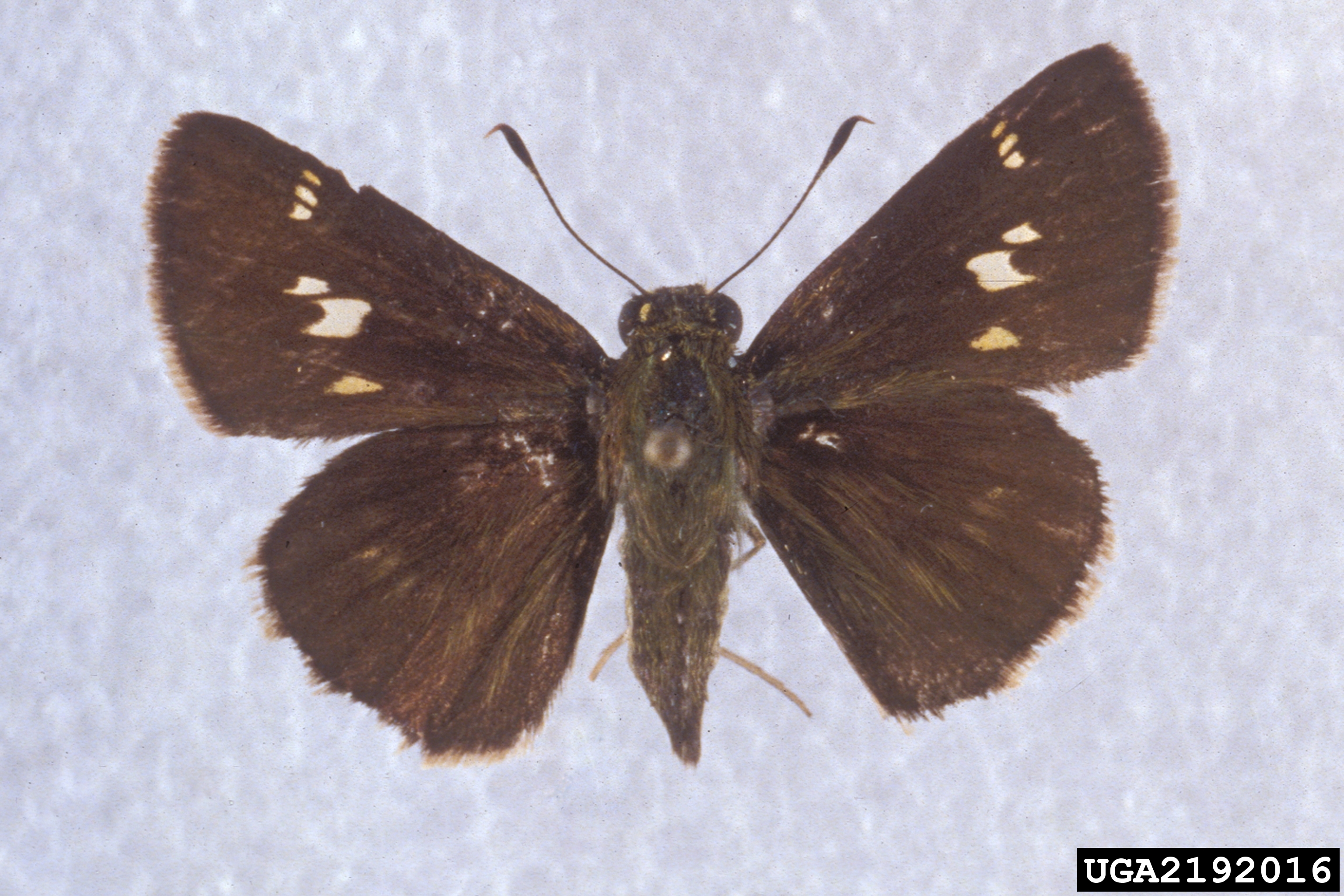

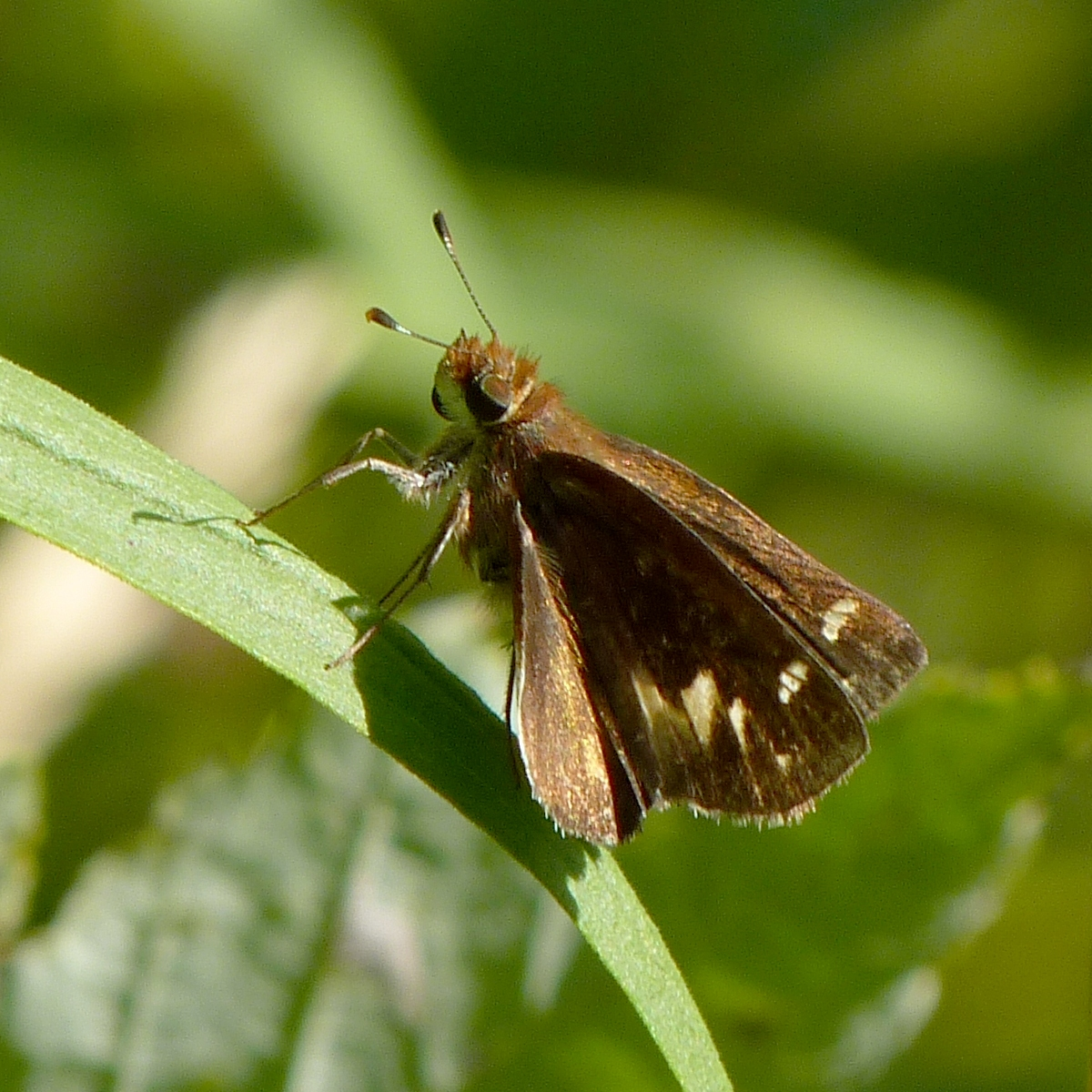

Conservation status
- Secure (NatureServe)

Scientific classification
- Kingdom: Animalia
- Phylum: Arthropoda
- Clade: Pancrustacea
- Class: Insecta
- Order: Lepidoptera
- Family: Hesperiidae
- Genus: Vernia
- Species: V. verna

Binomial name
- Vernia verna (Edwards, 1862)

Synonyms
- List: Pamphila verna Edwards, 1862; Polites verna; Pamphila pottawattomie Worthington, 1880; Hesperia vetulina Plötz, 1883; Pamphila sigida Mabille, 1891; Pompeius verna (Edwards, 1862)

= Vernia verna =

Species of butterfly

Vernia verna, the little glassywing, is a species of butterfly of the family Hesperiidae. It is found in the eastern United States and southeastern Canada, from central New England west to central Nebraska, south to northern Florida, the Gulf Coast and southern Texas.

The wingspan is 27–39 mm. Adults prefer to feed on the nectar of white, pink and purple flowers, including Apocynum, Prunella, Mentha × piperita, Eutrochium and Asclepias.

The larvae feed on Tridens flavus.

== Subspecies ==
- Vernia verna verna
- Vernia verna sequoyah (Freeman, 1942)
