= Purple vetch =

Purple vetch is a common name for several plants and may refer to:

- Vicia americana
- Vicia benghalensis, native to southern Europe and north Africa

It is a legume used as livestock feed. It used to be an ingredient in a lawn seed mix. It can be a nuisance in the garden due to its winding nature and can be considered a weed.
