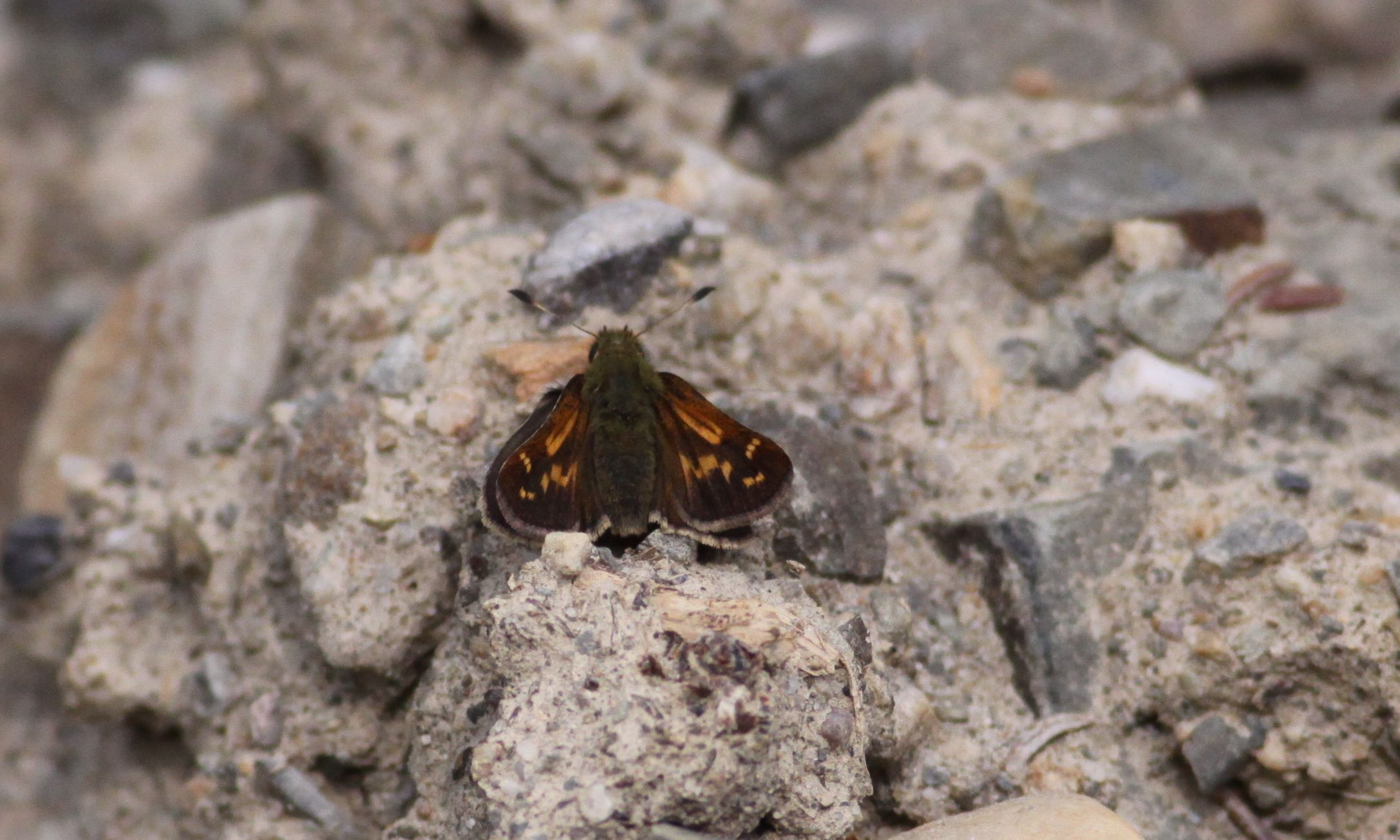
- Polites draco in Banff National Park

Conservation status
- Secure (NatureServe)

Scientific classification
- Kingdom: Animalia
- Phylum: Arthropoda
- Clade: Pancrustacea
- Class: Insecta
- Order: Lepidoptera
- Family: Hesperiidae
- Genus: Polites
- Species: P. draco

Binomial name
- Polites draco (W.H. Edwards, 1871)

= Polites draco =

Species of butterfly

Polites draco, the draco skipper, Rocky Mountain skipper, or dragon skipper, is a butterfly in the family Hesperiidae. It is found in the Rocky Mountain states and provinces from Arizona to the Yukon Territory.

The wingspan is 21–33 mm.

There is one generation with adults on wing from June to early August.

The larvae feed on various grasses. Adults feed on flower nectar.
