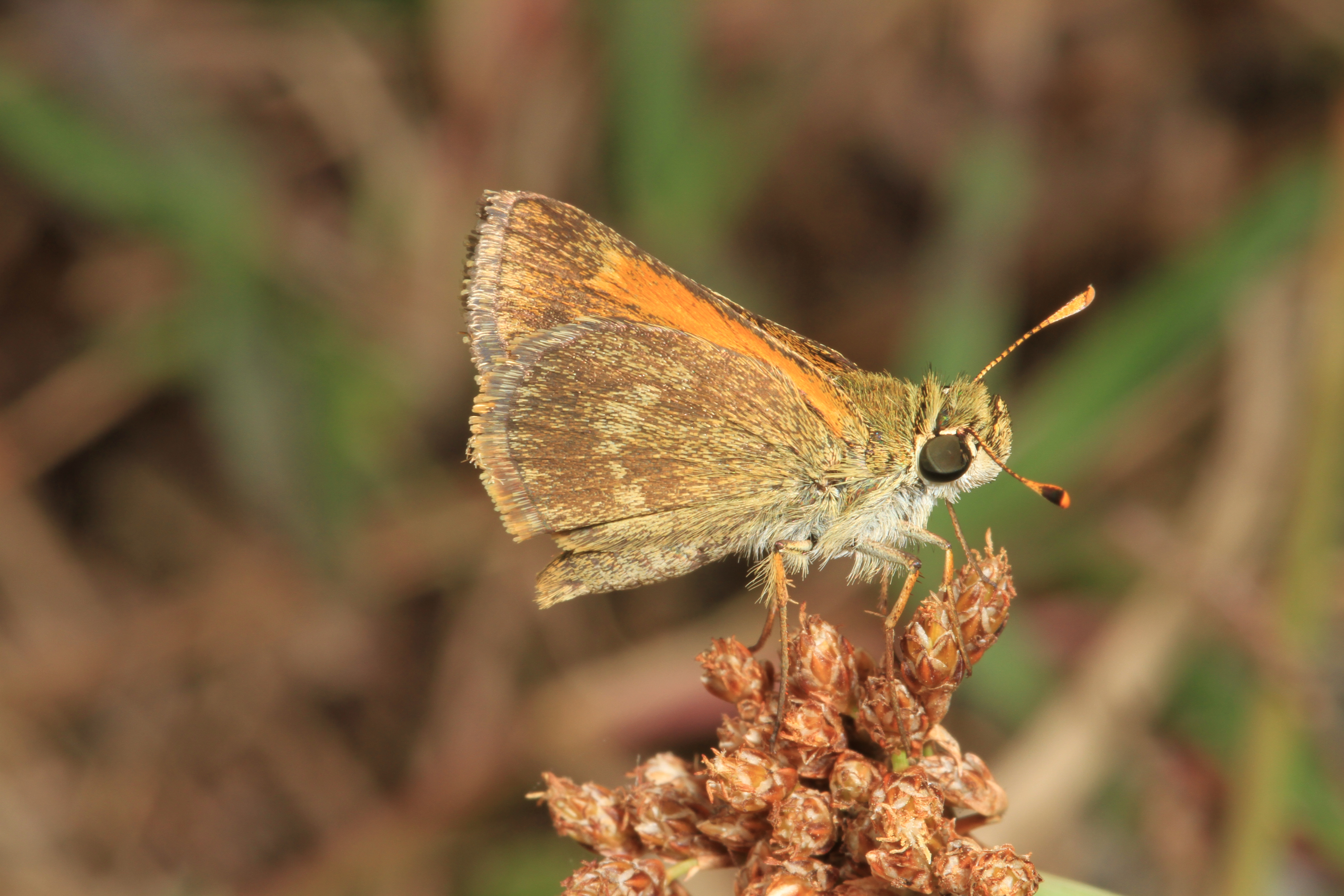

Conservation status
- Secure (NatureServe)

Scientific classification
- Kingdom: Animalia
- Phylum: Arthropoda
- Class: Insecta
- Order: Lepidoptera
- Family: Hesperiidae
- Genus: Polites
- Species: P. baracoa

Binomial name
- Polites baracoa (Lucas, 1857)

Synonyms
- Pamphila amadis Herrich-Schäffer, 1863

= Polites baracoa =

Species of butterfly

Polites baracoa, known generally as the baracoa skipper or little tawny edge skipper, is a species of grass skipper in the butterfly family Hesperiidae. It is found in the Caribbean Sea and North America.

The MONA or Hodges number for Polites baracoa is 4040.

== Subspecies ==
These two subspecies belong to the species Polites baracoa:

- Polites baracoa baracoa (Lucas, 1857)
- Polites baracoa loma Evnas, 1955
