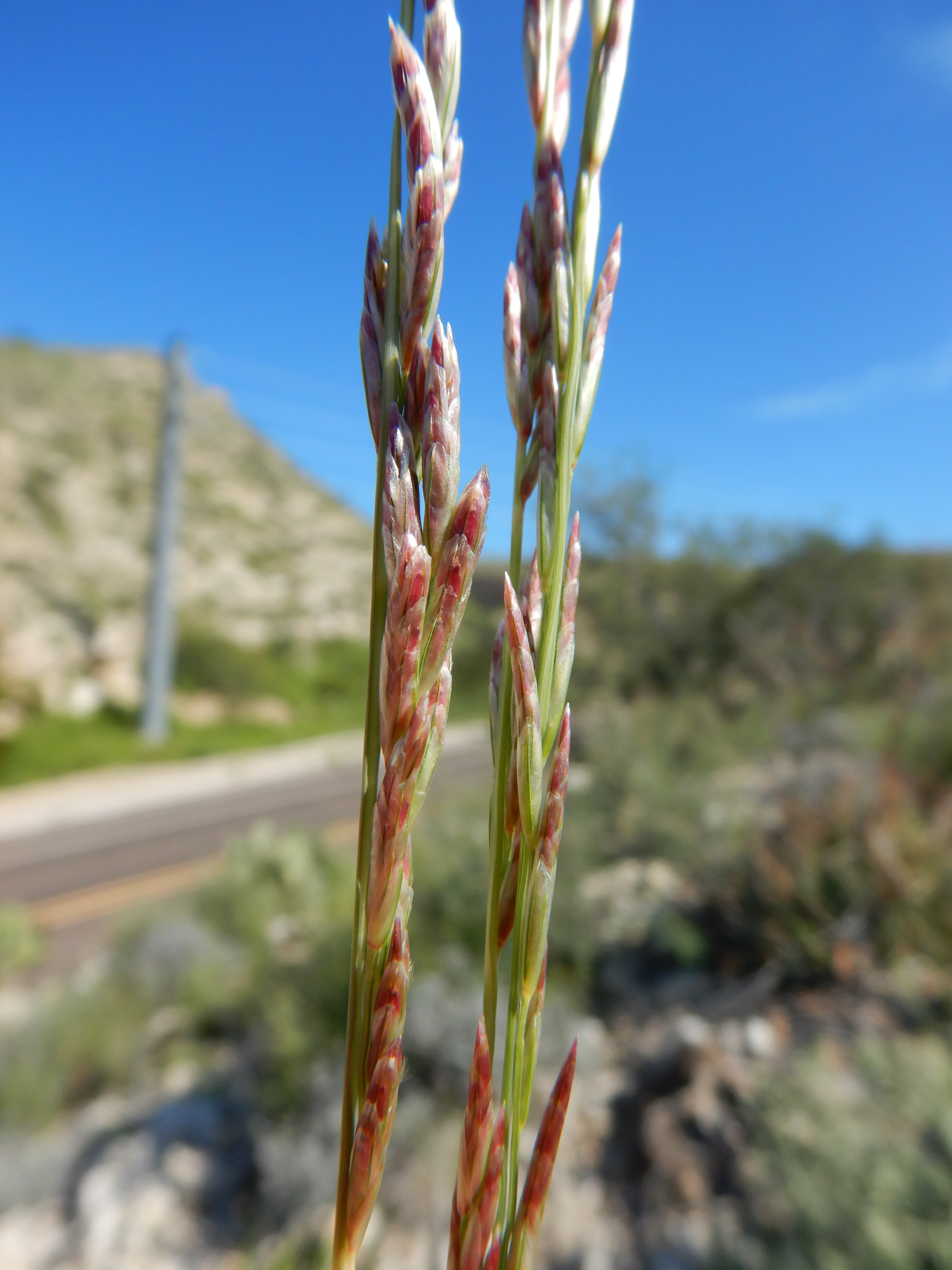
- Tridentopsis mutica

Scientific classification
- Kingdom: Plantae
- Clade: Tracheophytes
- Clade: Angiosperms
- Clade: Monocots
- Clade: Commelinids
- Order: Poales
- Family: Poaceae
- Subfamily: Chloridoideae
- Tribe: Cynodonteae
- Subtribe: Gouiniinae
- Genus: Tridentopsis; P.M.Peterson

= Tridentopsis (plant) =

Genus of grasses

Tridentopsis is a genus of grasses. It includes three species native to the southwestern and south-central United States and northern Mexico.

- Tridentopsis buckleyana (L.H.Dewey) P.M.Peterson & Romasch.
- Tridentopsis elongata (Buckley) Wipff & Weakley
- Tridentopsis mutica (Torr.) P.M.Peterson
