= List of former species in the genus Hesperia =

This is a list of former species in the butterfly genus Hesperia, with the current species name.

Selected former species include:

== A ==
- H. achelous Plötz, 1882 - transferred to Enosis achelous (Plötz, 1882)
- H. aesculapius Fabricius, 1793 - transferred to Amblyscirtes aesculapius (Fabricius, 1793)
- H. aethra Plötz, 1886 - synonymized with Lerema lineosa (Herrich-Schäffer, 1865)
- H. agricola Boisduval, 1852 - transferred to Ochlodes agricola (Boisduval, 1852)
- H. angellus Plötz, 1886 - transferred to Halotus angellus (Plötz, 1886)
- H. anthea Hewitson, 1868 - transferred to Acerbas anthea (Hewitson, 1868)
- H. artona Hewitson, 1868 - transferred to Artonia artona (Hewitson, 1868)
- H. atticus Fabricius, 1793 - transferred to Tagiades atticus (Fabricius, 1793)
- H. autumna Plötz, 1883 - transferred to Cobalopsis autumna (Plötz, 1883)
- H. avesta Hewitson, 1868 - transferred to Avestia avesta (Hewitson, 1868)

== B ==
- H. basoches Latreille, [1824] - transferred to Carystoides basoches (Latreille, [1824])
- H. biforis Weymer, 1890 - transferred to Zalomes biforis (Weymer, 1890)
- H. borbonica Boisduval, 1833 - transferred to Borbo borbonica (Boisduval, 1833)
- H. braesia Hewitson, 1867 - transferred to Rhinthon braesia (Hewitson, 1867)
- H. brebisson Latreille, [1824] - transferred to Gindanes brebisson (Latreille, [1824])

== C ==
- H. calvina Hewitson, 1866 - transferred to Calvetta calvina (Hewitson, 1866)
- H. camposa Plötz, 1886 - transferred to Turmosa camposa (Plötz, 1886)
- H. catullus Fabricius, 1793 - transferred to Pholisora catullus (Fabricius, 1793)
- H. caura Plötz, 1882 - transferred to Thargella caura (Plötz, 1882)
- H. celsus Fabricius, 1793 - transferred to Lychnuchus celsus (Fabricius, 1793)
- H. cinica Plötz, 1882 - transferred to Dubiella dubius (Stoll, 1781)
- H. circellata Plötz, 1882 - transferred to Tricrista circellata (Plötz, 1882)
- H. corisana Plötz, 1882 - transferred to Nycea corisana (Plötz, 1882)
- H. corticea Plötz, 1882 - transferred to Corticea corticea (Plötz, 1882)
- H. coryna Hewitson, [1866] - transferred to Corra coryna (Hewitson, [1866])
- H. cynea Hewitson, 1876 - transferred to Cynea cynea (Hewitson, 1876)
- H. cyrina Hewitson, 1876 - transferred to Creteus cyrina (Hewitson, 1876)

== D ==
- H. dacela Hewitson, 1876 - transferred to Caenides dacela (Hewitson, 1876)
- H. dacena Hewitson, 1876 - transferred to Hypoleucis dacena (Hewitson, 1876)
- H. dares Plötz, 1883 - transferred to Vernia dares (Plötz, 1883)
- H. decinea Hewitson, 1876 - transferred to Decinea decinea (Hewitson, 1876)
- H. degener Plötz, 1882 - transferred to Alychna degener (Plötz, 1882)
- H. diana Plötz, 1886 - transferred to Mielkeus diana (Plötz, 1886)
- H. dido Plötz, 1882 - transferred to Cynea cannae (Herrich-Schaffer, 1869)
- H. discors Plötz, 1882 - transferred to Carystina discors (Herrich-Schaffer, 1869)
- H. distigma Plötz, 1882 - transferred to Contrastia distigma (Plötz, 1882)
- H. dolopia Hewitson, 1868 - transferred to Sebastonyma dolopia (Hewitson, 1868)
- H. duroca Plötz, 1882 - transferred to Duroca duroca (Plötz, 1882)

== E ==
- H. edata Plötz, 1882 - transferred to Cymaenes edata (Plötz, 1882)
- H. epictetus Fabricius, 1793 - transferred to Anthoptus epictetus (Fabricius, 1793)
- H. ethoda Hewitson, [1866] - transferred to Neoxeniades ethoda (Hewitson, [1866])
- H. eufala Edwards, 1869 - transferred to Lerodea eufala (Edwards, 1869)

== F ==
- H. fusca Grote and Robinson, 1867 - synonymized with Nastra lherminier (Latreille, [1824])

== H ==
- H. hazarma Hewitson, 1877 - transferred to Haza hazarma (Hewitson, 1877)
- H. heraea Hewitson, 1868 - synonymized with Molo mango (Guenée, 1865)
- H. hermoda Hewitson, 1870 - transferred to Xeniades hermoda (Hewitson, 1870)
- H. hesia Hewitson, 1870 - transferred to Rigga hesia (Hewitson, 1870)
- H. hobomok Harris, 1862 - transferred to Lon hobomok (Harris, 1862)
- H. huron Edwards, 1863 - transferred to Atalopedes campestris huron (Edwards, 1863)
- H. hyboma Plötz, 1886 - transferred to Metrocles hyboma (Plötz, 1886)

== I ==
- H. immaculata Hewitson, 1868 - transferred to Lychnuchus immaculata (Hewitson, 1868)
- H. ina Plötz, 1882 - transferred to Methionopsis ina (Plötz, 1882)
- H. infuscata Plötz, 1882 - synonymized with Mnaseas derasa (Herrich-Schäffer, 1870)

== J ==
- H. justinianus Latreille, [1824] - transferred to Justinia justinianus (Latreille, [1824])

== K ==
- H. kiowah Reakirt, 1866 - transferred to Euphyes kiowah (Reakirt, 1866)
- H. kora Hewitson, 1877 - transferred to Koria kora (Hewitson, 1877)

== L ==
- H. lamponia Hewitson, 1876 - transferred to Lamponia lamponia (Hewitson, 1876)
- H. leonora Plötz, 1879 - transferred to Leona leonora (Plötz, 1879)
- H. lepenula Wallengren, 1857 - transferred to Kedestes lepenula (Wallengren, 1857)
- H. lepeletier Latreille, 1824 - transferred to Lepella lepeletier (Latreille, 1824)
- H. lherminier Latreille, [1824] - transferred to Nastra lherminier (Latreille, [1824])
- H. ligora Hewitson, 1876 - transferred to Paronymus ligora (Hewitson, 1876)
- H. limbata Erschoff, 1876 - transferred to Chirgus limbata (Erschoff, 1876)
- H. lina Plötz, 1883 - transferred to Atalopedes lina (Plötz, 1883)
- H. litana Hewitson, [1866] - transferred to Vacerra litana (Hewitson, [1866])
- H. lochius Plötz, 1882 - transferred to Cymaenes lochius (Plötz, 1882)
- H. locutia Hewitson, 1876 - transferred to Oligoria locutia (Hewitson, 1876)
- H. lota Hewitson, 1877 - transferred to Carystus lota (Hewitson, 1877)
- H. lucretius Latreille, [1824] - transferred to Mielkeus lucretius (Latreille, [1824])

== M ==
- H. maculata Edwards, 1865 - transferred to Oligoria maculata (Edwards, 1865)
- H. maevius Fabricius, 1793 - transferred to Taractrocera maevius (Fabricius, 1793)
- H. mammaea Hewitson, 1876 - transferred to Testia mammaea (Hewitson, 1876)
- H. manataaqua Scudder, 1864 - synonymized with Limochores origenes Fabricius, 1793
- H. mango Guenée, 1865 - transferred to Molo mango (Guenée, 1865)
- H. maracanda Hewitson, 1876 - transferred to Lennia maracanda (Hewitson, 1876)
- H. massasoit Scudder, 1863 - transferred to Poanes massasoit (Scudder, 1863)
- H. melane Edwards, 1869 - transferred to Lon melane (Edwards, 1869)
- H. metacomet Harris, 1862 - transferred to Euphyes vestris metacomet (Boisduval, 1852)
- H. mohozutza Wallengren, 1857 - transferred to Nervia mohozutza (Wallengren, 1857)

== N ==
- H. nemorum Boisduval, 1852 - transferred to Ochlodes agricola nemorum (Boisduval, 1852)
- H. nerva Fabricius, 1793 - transferred to Nervia nerva (Fabricius, 1793)
- H. nigrita Latreille, [1824] - transferred to Tamela nigrita (Latreille, [1824])

== O ==
- H. osca Plötz, 1882 - transferred to Rhinthon osca (Plötz, 1882)
- H. omaha Edwards, 1863 - transferred to Potanthus omaha (Edwards, 1863)

== P ==
- H. papyria Boisduval, 1832 - transferred to Bibla pelopidas (Boisduval, 1832)
- H. paria Plötz, 1882 - transferred to Eutychide paria (Plötz, 1882)
- H. perla Plötz, 1882 - synonymized with Tigasis perloides (Plötz, 1882)
- H. pelopidas Fabricius, 1793 - transferred to Hoodus pelopidas (Fabricius, 1793)
- H. perloides Plötz, 1882 - transferred to Tigasis perloides (Plötz, 1882)
- H. phocylides Plötz, 1882 - synonymized with Cymaenes edata (Plötz, 1882)
- H. physcella Hewitson, 1866 - transferred to Eutychide physcella (Hewitson, 1866)
- H. pompeius Latreille, [1824] - transferred to Pompeius pompeius (Latreille, [1824])
- H. propertius Fabricius, 1793 - transferred to Propertius propertius (Fabricius, 1793)
- H. pruinosa Plötz, 1882 - transferred to Enosis uza pruinosa (Plötz, 1882)
- H. pupillus Plötz, 1882 - transferred to Limochores pupillus (Plötz, 1882)

== R ==
- H. radians Lucas, 1857 - transferred to Choranthus radians (Lucas, 1857)
- H. remus Fabricius, 1798 - transferred to Remella remus (Fabricius, 1798)

== S ==
- H. sabina Plötz, 1882 - transferred to Psoralis sabina (Plötz, 1882)
- H. sacrator Godman and Salvin, 1879 - transferred to Thracides sacrator (Godman and Salvin, 1879)
- H. saptine Godman and Salvin, 1879 - transferred to Perichares saptine (Godman and Salvin, 1879)
- H. sucova Schaus, 1902 - transferred to Mnasitheus sucova (Schaus, 1902)

== U ==
- H. ulphila Plötz, 1883 - transferred to Lon ulphila (Plötz, 1883)
- H. umbrata Erschoff, 1876 - transferred to Psoralis umbrata (Erschoff, 1876)
- H. uza Hewitson, 1877 - transferred to Enosis uza (Hewitson, 1877)

== V ==
- H. vialis Edwards, 1862 - transferred to Amblyscirtes vialis (Edwards, 1862)
- H. viator Edwards, 1865 - transferred to Poanes viator (Edwards, 1865)
- H. vulpina C. and R. Felder, 1867 - transferred to Oenides vulpina (C. and R. Felder, 1867)

== Z ==
- H. zabulon Boisduval and Le Conte, [1837] - transferred to Lon zabulon (Boisduval and Le Conte, [1837])
- H. zalma Plötz, 1886 - synonymized with Mnasilus allubita (Butler, 1877)
- H. zygia Plötz, 1886 - synonymized with Mucia zygia (Plötz, 1886)
