= Paronymus budonga =

Scientific classification
- Domain: Eukaryota
- Kingdom: Animalia
- Phylum: Arthropoda
- Class: Insecta
- Order: Lepidoptera
- Family: Hesperiidae
- Genus: Paronymus
- Species: P. budonga

Binomial name
- Paronymus budonga (Evans, 1938)

Synonyms
- Gastrochaeta budonga Evans, 1938; Meza budonga

Species of butterfly

Paronymus budonga is a butterfly in the family Hesperiidae. It is found in western Uganda and north-western Tanzania. The habitat consists of forests.
