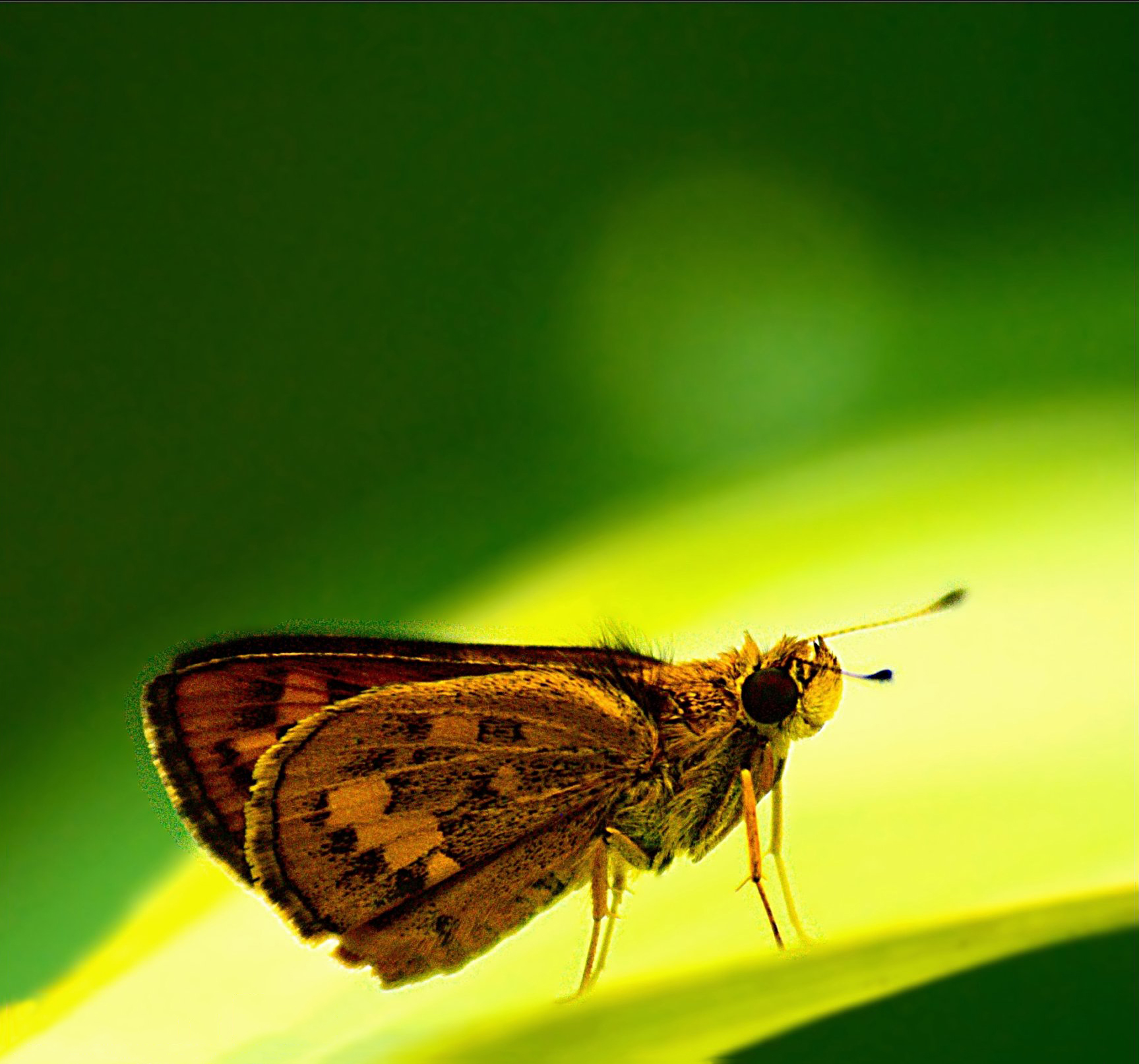

Scientific classification
- Kingdom: Animalia
- Phylum: Arthropoda
- Clade: Pancrustacea
- Class: Insecta
- Order: Lepidoptera
- Family: Hesperiidae
- Genus: Potanthus
- Species: P. pseudomaesa

Binomial name
- Potanthus pseudomaesa (Moore, 1881)

= Potanthus pseudomaesa =

Indian dart

Species of butterfly

Potanthus pseudomaesa, commonly known as the Indian dart, is a species of butterfly belonging to the family Hesperiidae. It is found in India and Sri Lanka. The larvae are known to feed on Axonopus compressus.
