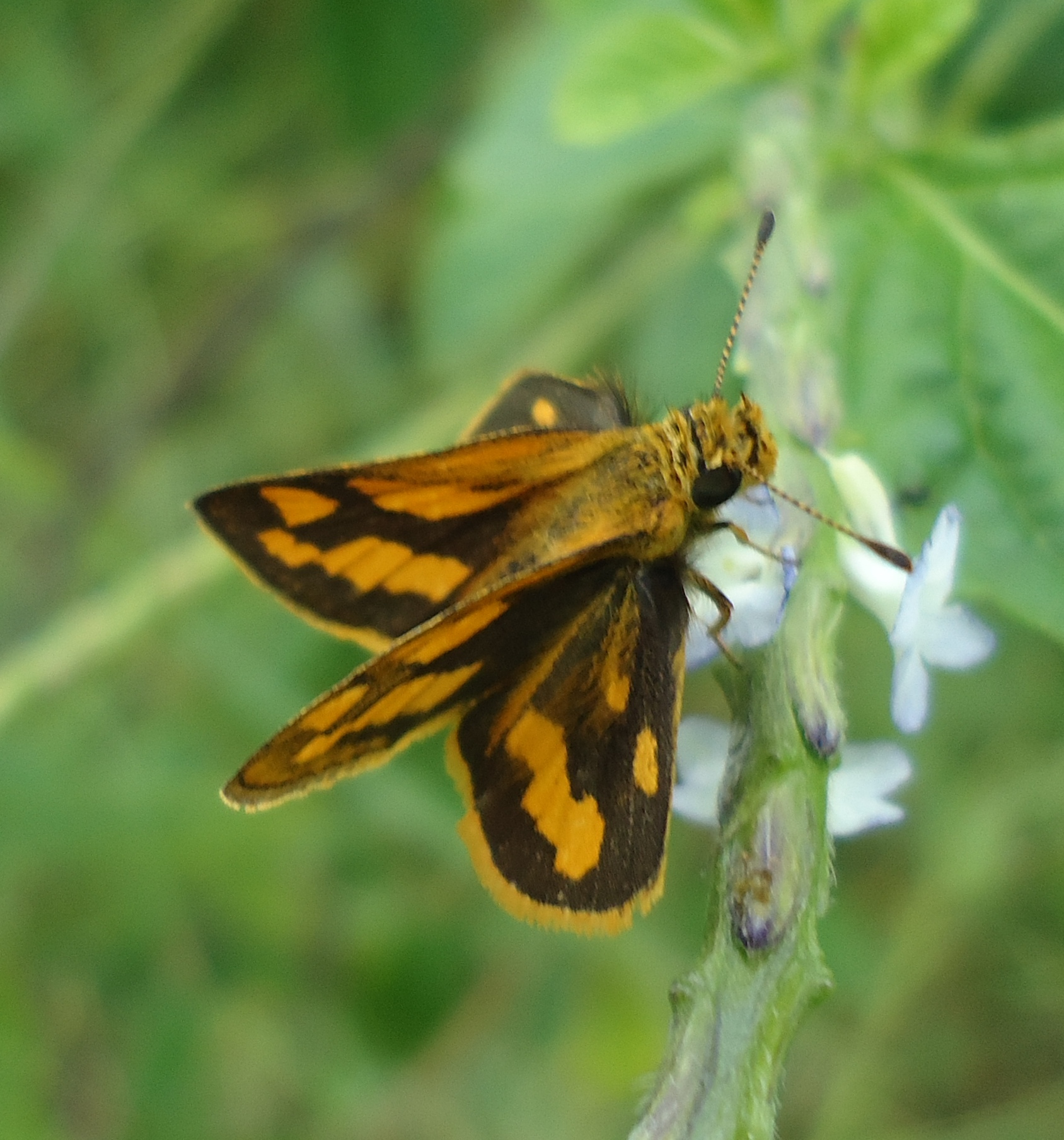
- Potanthus niobe from Mindanao, Philippines

Scientific classification
- Kingdom: Animalia
- Phylum: Arthropoda
- Class: Insecta
- Order: Lepidoptera
- Family: Hesperiidae
- Genus: Potanthus
- Species: P. niobe

Binomial name
- Potanthus niobe (Evans, 1934)

Synonyms
- Padraona niobe Evans, 1934; Potanthus hyugai Hsu, Tsukiyama & Chiba, 2005; Potanthus flavus niobe Evans, 1949

= Potanthus niobe =

Species of butterfly

Potanthus niobe is a species of skipper butterflies endemic to the Philippines. It contains two subspecies:

- Potanthus niobe niobe (Evans, 1934) - found in Mindanao. Underside of hindwing is dark brown with an overshadowing of yellow scales. The discal spots are yellow with dark veins.
- Potanthus niobe hyugai de Jong & Treadaway, 1993 - found in Visayas and Luzon. Underside of hindwing is a warm reddish brown with orange-yellow discal spots and the veins outlined in a lighter shade.
