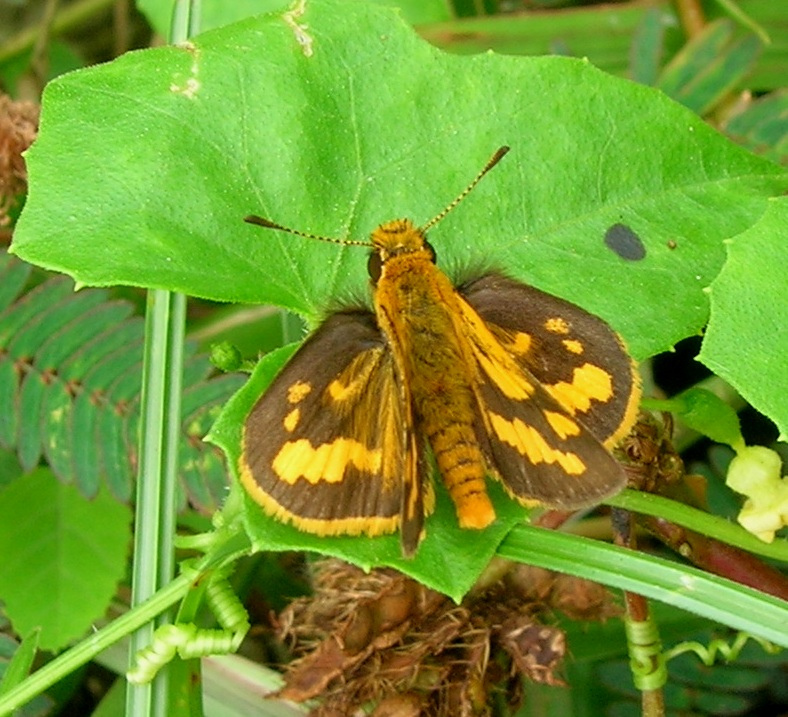
- From Luzon, Philippines

Scientific classification
- Kingdom: Animalia
- Phylum: Arthropoda
- Class: Insecta
- Order: Lepidoptera
- Family: Hesperiidae
- Genus: Potanthus
- Species: P. pava

Binomial name
- Potanthus pava (Fruhstorfer, 1911)

= Potanthus pava =

Pava dart

Species of butterfly

Potanthus pava, commonly known as the Pava dart or yellow dart, is a butterfly belonging to the family Hesperiidae. It is found from southern India to central China, Taiwan, Malaysia, the Philippines, and Sulawesi, Indonesia.
