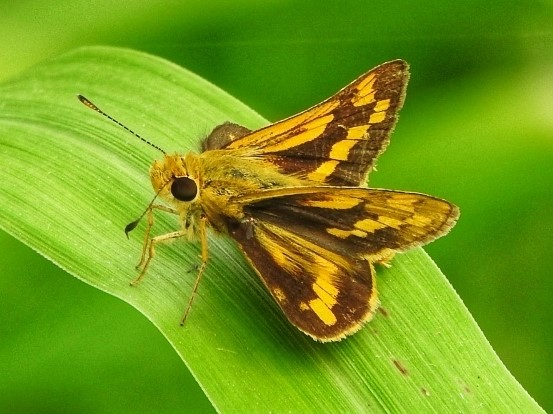

Scientific classification
- Kingdom: Animalia
- Phylum: Arthropoda
- Class: Insecta
- Order: Lepidoptera
- Family: Hesperiidae
- Genus: Potanthus
- Species: P. pallida

Binomial name
- Potanthus pallida (Evans, 1932)

Synonyms
- Potanthus pallidus (Evans, 1932)

= Potanthus pallida =

Pallid dart

Species of butterfly

Potanthus pallida, commonly known as the pallid dart or pale dart, is a species of butterfly in the family Hesperiidae found in India.
