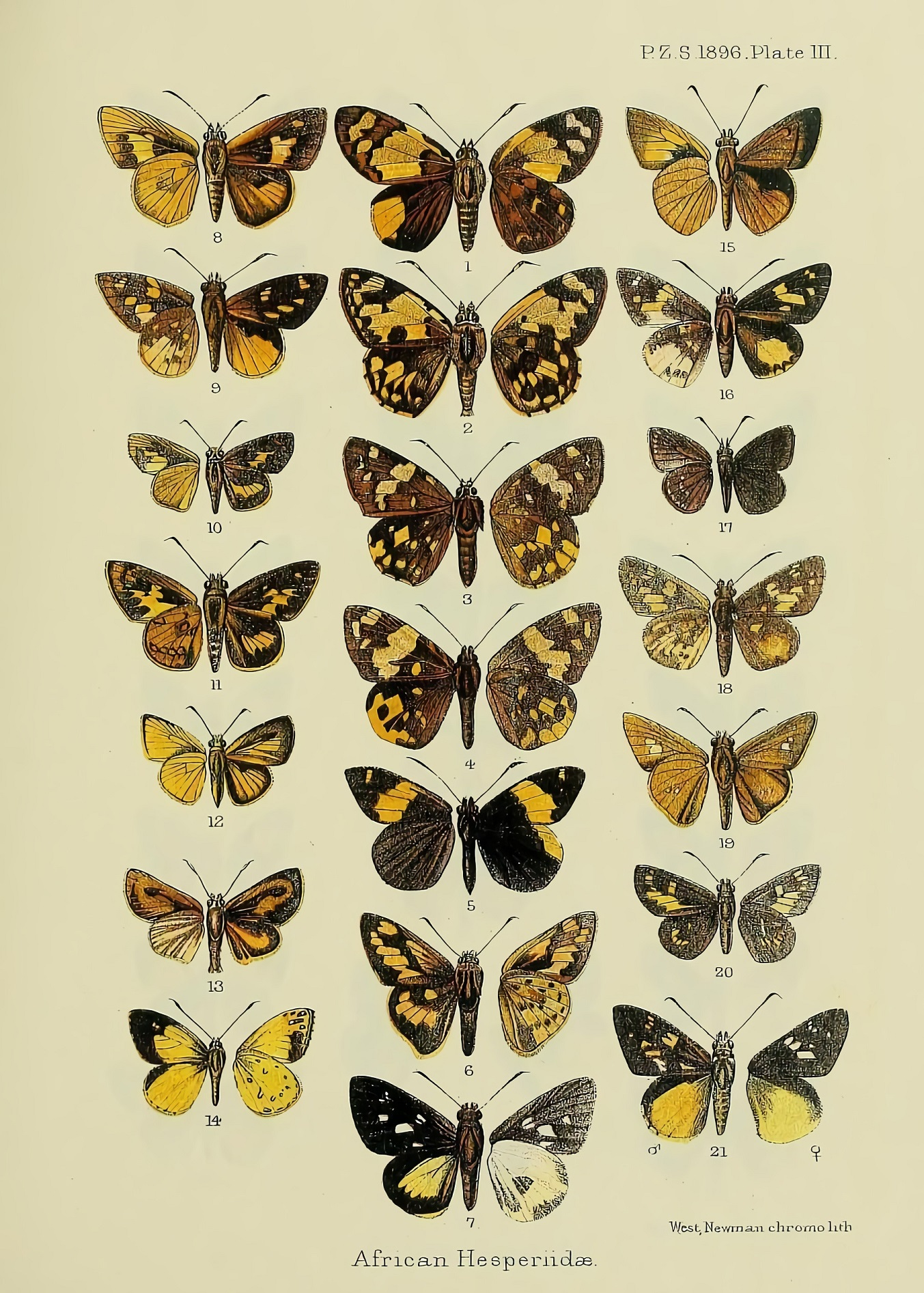
- Figure 7

Scientific classification
- Domain: Eukaryota
- Kingdom: Animalia
- Phylum: Arthropoda
- Class: Insecta
- Order: Lepidoptera
- Family: Hesperiidae
- Genus: Paronymus
- Species: P. xanthias

Binomial name
- Paronymus xanthias (Mabille, 1891)

Synonyms
- Carystus xanthias Mabille, 1891

= Paronymus xanthias =

Species of butterfly

Paronymus xanthias, the yellow largest dart, is a butterfly in the family Hesperiidae. It is found in Guinea, Sierra Leone, Ivory Coast, Ghana, Nigeria, Cameroon, Gabon, the Republic of the Congo, the Central African Republic, the Democratic Republic of the Congo, Uganda, Tanzania and Zambia. The habitat consists of forests.

== Subspecies ==
- Paronymus xanthias xanthias (Guinea, Sierra Leone, Ivory Coast, Ghana, Nigeria, Cameroon, Gabon, Congo, Central African Republic, western Democratic Republic of the Congo)
- Paronymus xanthius kiellandi Congdon & Collins, 1998 (Uganda, north-western Tanzania, north-western Zambia)
