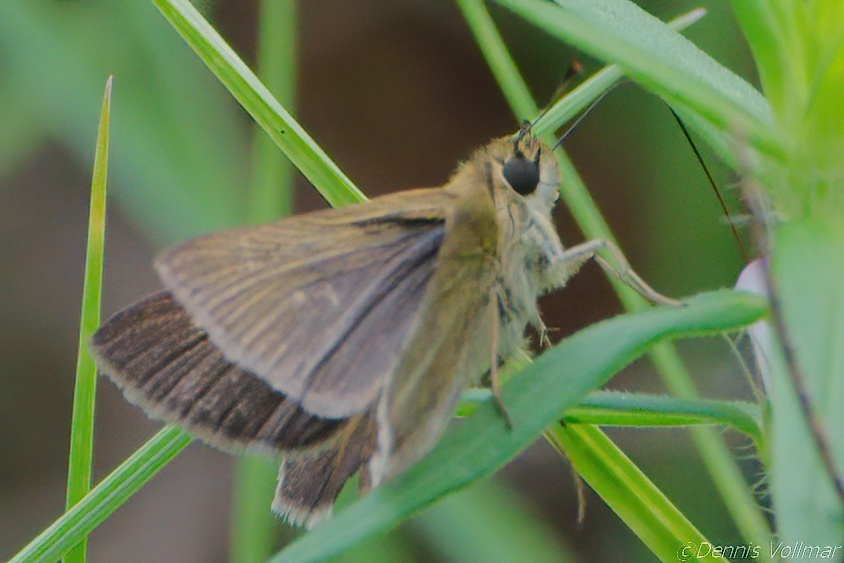

Scientific classification
- Kingdom: Animalia
- Phylum: Arthropoda
- Class: Insecta
- Order: Lepidoptera
- Family: Hesperiidae
- Genus: Nastra
- Species: N. neamathla

Binomial name
- Nastra neamathla (Skinner & R. Williams, 1923)

= Nastra neamathla =

Species of butterfly

Nastra neamathla, known generally as the neamathla skipper or southern swarthy skipper, is a species of grass skipper in the butterfly family Hesperiidae. It is found in the Southeastern United States.

The MONA or Hodges number for Nastra neamathla is 3995.

== Description ==
The upperside of the wing is brown with no markings. The underside of the wing is black at the base and yellow-brown on the rest of wing. The hindwing is yellow-brown with no pale scales on the veins.
