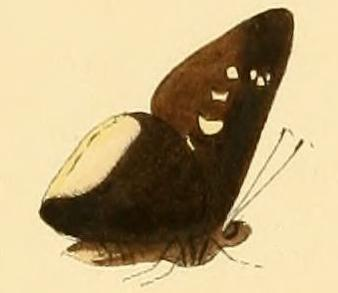
- Eutychide physcella

Scientific classification
- Kingdom: Animalia
- Phylum: Arthropoda
- Class: Insecta
- Order: Lepidoptera
- Family: Hesperiidae
- Subfamily: Hesperiinae
- Tribe: Hesperiini
- Subtribe: Moncina
- Genus: Eutychide; Godman in Godman & Salvin, [1900]

= Eutychide =

Genus of butterflies

Eutychide is a genus of skippers in the family Hesperiidae.

== Species ==
- Eutychide complana (Herrich-Schäffer, 1869)
- Eutychide olympia (Plötz, 1882)
- Eutychide paria (Plötz, 1882)
- Eutychide physcella (Hewitson, [1866])
- Eutychide subcordata (Herrich-Schäffer, 1869)

=== Former species ===
- Eutychide asema (Mabille, 1891) - transferred to Adlerodea asema (Mabille, 1891)
- Eutychide gertschi Bell, 1937 - transferred to Rhomba gertschi (Bell, 1937)
- Eutychide lycortas Godman, 1900 - transferred to Corta lycortas (Godman, 1900)
- Eutychide maculata Bell, 1930 - transferred to Justinia maculata (Bell, 1930)
- Eutychide orthos Godman, [1900] - transferred to Orthos orthos (Godman, [1900])
- Eutychide rastaca (Schaus, 1902) - transferred to Eutus rastaca (Schaus, 1902)
- Eutychide submetallescens Hayward, 1940 - transferred to Mnasitheus submetallescens (Hayward, 1940)
- Eutychide subpunctata Hayward, 1940 - transferred to Adlerodea subpunctata (Hayward, 1940)
