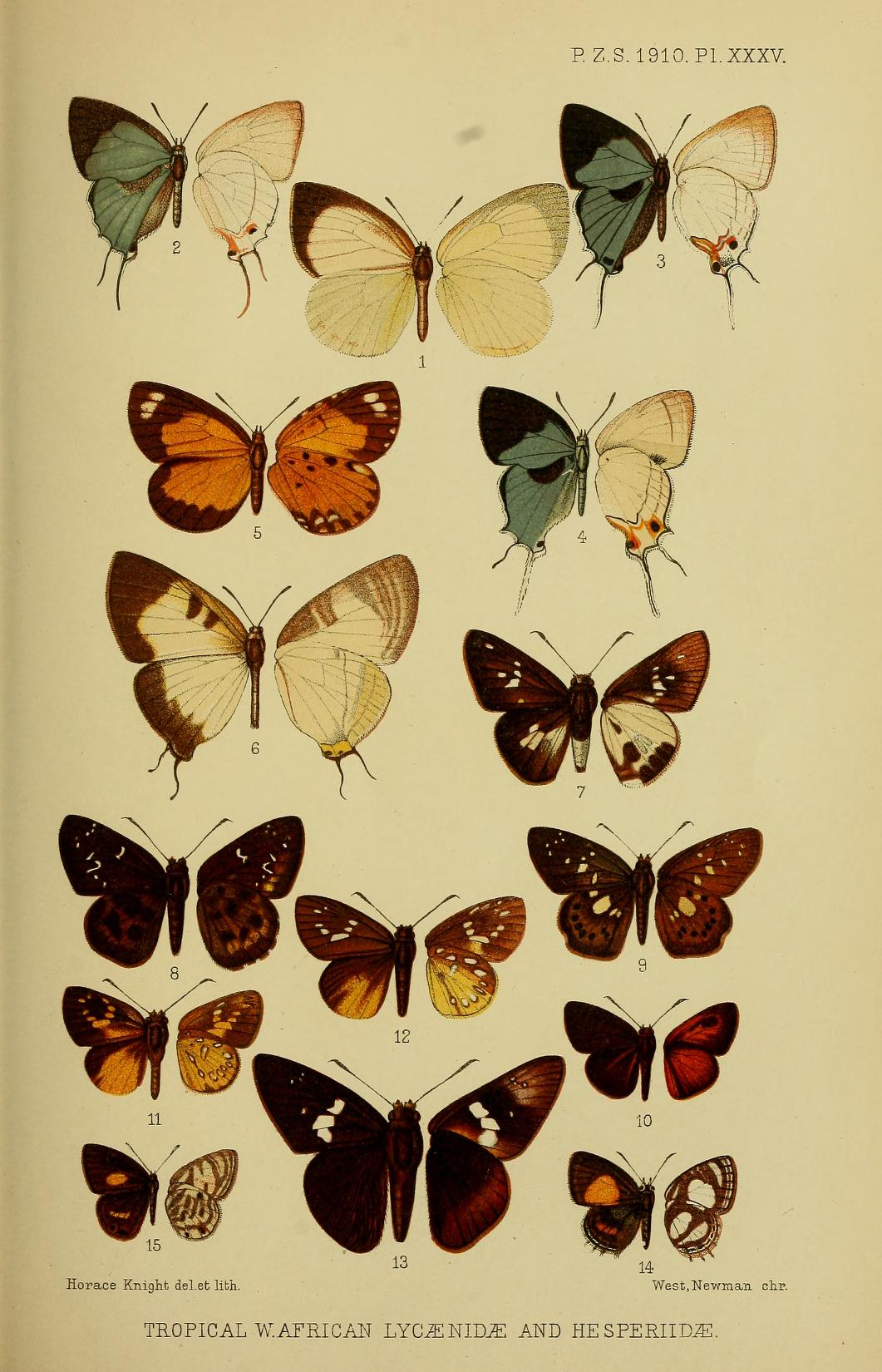
- Paronymus figure 7

Scientific classification
- Kingdom: Animalia
- Phylum: Arthropoda
- Class: Insecta
- Order: Lepidoptera
- Family: Hesperiidae
- Tribe: Erionotini
- Genus: Paronymus; Aurivillius, [1925]

= Paronymus =

Genus of butterflies

Paronymus, the large darts, is an Afrotropical genus of grass skippers in the family Hesperiidae.

== Species ==
- Paronymus budonga (Evans, 1938)
- Paronymus ligora (Hewitson, 1876)
- Paronymus nevea (Druce, 1910)
- Paronymus xanthias (Mabille, 1891)

=== Former species ===
- Paronymus xanthioides (Holland, 1892) - transferred to Xanthonymus xanthioides (Holland, 1892)
