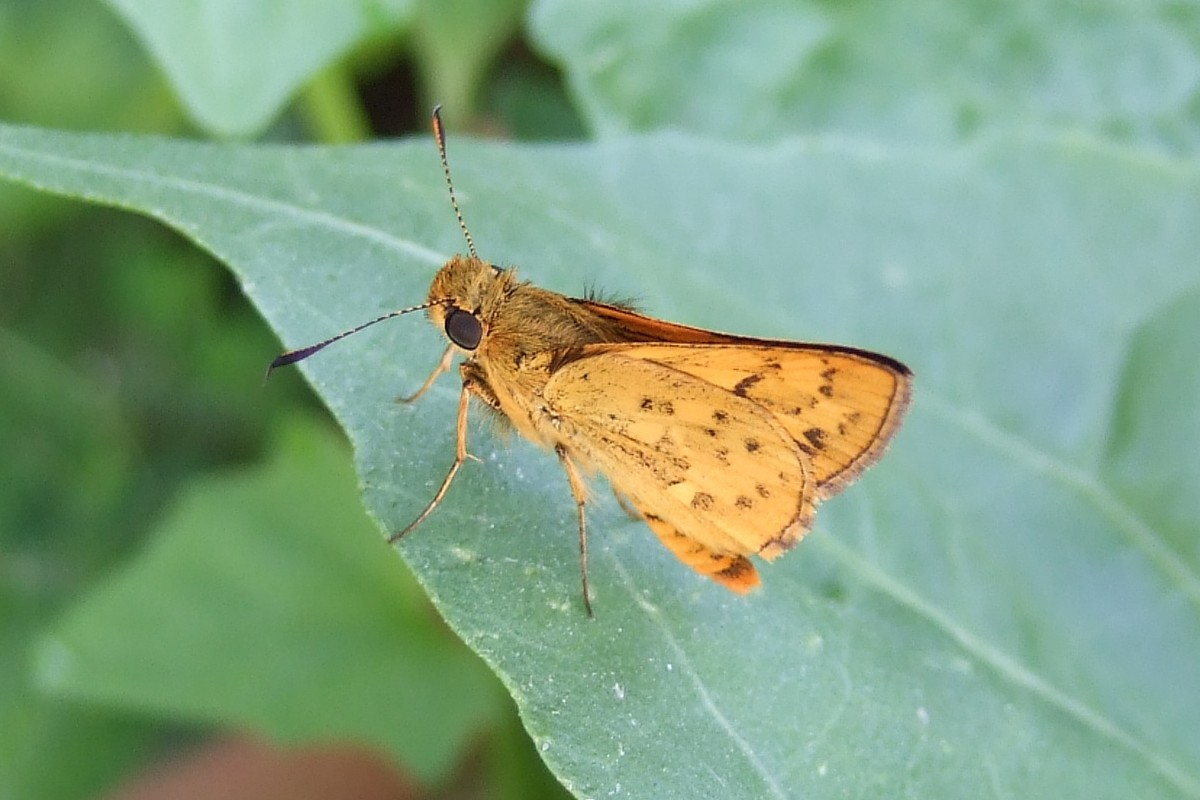

Scientific classification
- Kingdom: Animalia
- Phylum: Arthropoda
- Clade: Pancrustacea
- Class: Insecta
- Order: Lepidoptera
- Family: Hesperiidae
- Genus: Potanthus
- Species: P. confucius

Binomial name
- Potanthus confucius (Felder & Felder, 1862)

= Potanthus confucius =

Chinese dart

Species of butterfly

Potanthus confucius, the Chinese dart or Confucian dart, is a species of butterfly belonging to the family Hesperiidae. They are found from Sri Lanka and India to China and Japan and down to Sumatra and Java in Indonesia. Some museum specimens have also been reported to be from Palawan in the Philippines, but due to the absence of the species in Borneo, it is possible that these were mislabeled or misidentified.

== Subspecies ==
- P. c. diana (Evans, 1932) - Maharashtra to Kerala
- P. c. dushta (Fruhstorfer, 1911) - Sikkim, northeast India to Indochina
- P. c. nina (Evans, 1932) - Andaman and Nicobar Islands

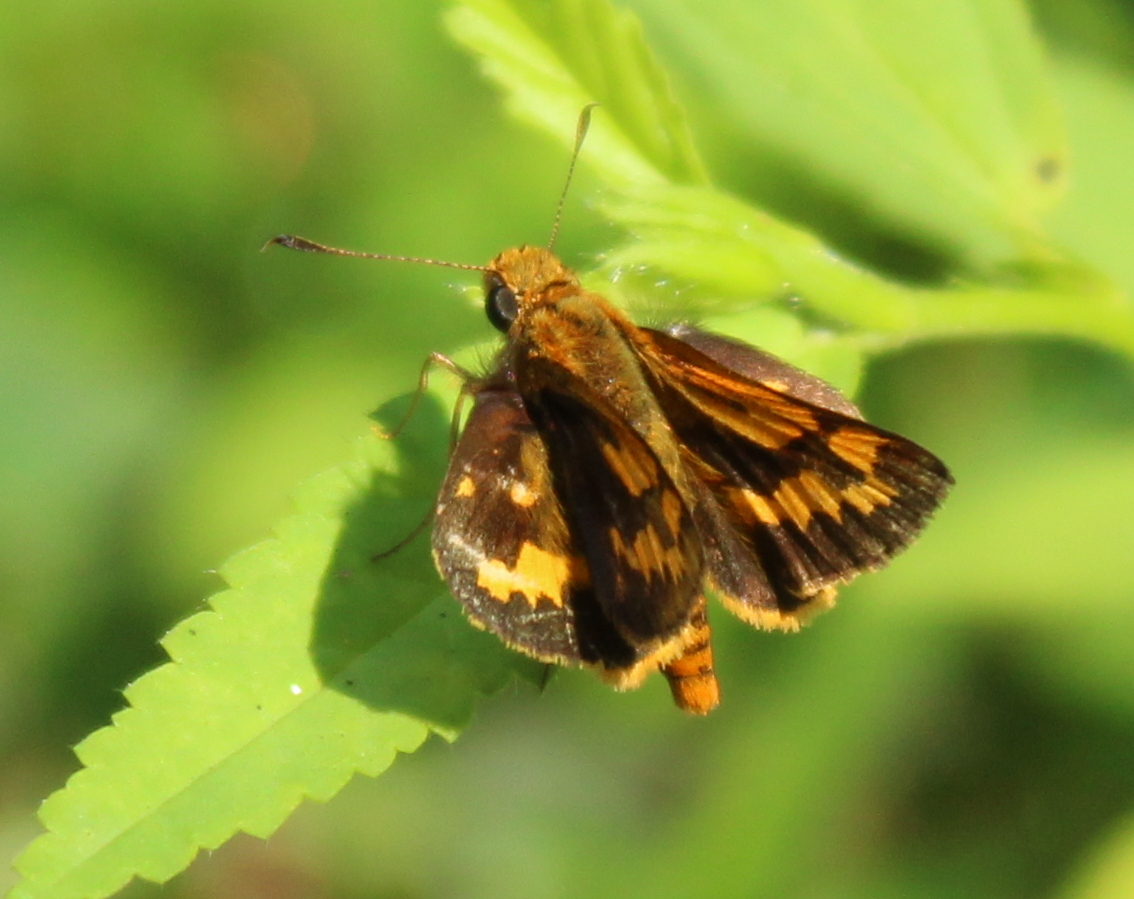
Potanthus confucius diana as seen in Mangalore, Karnataka

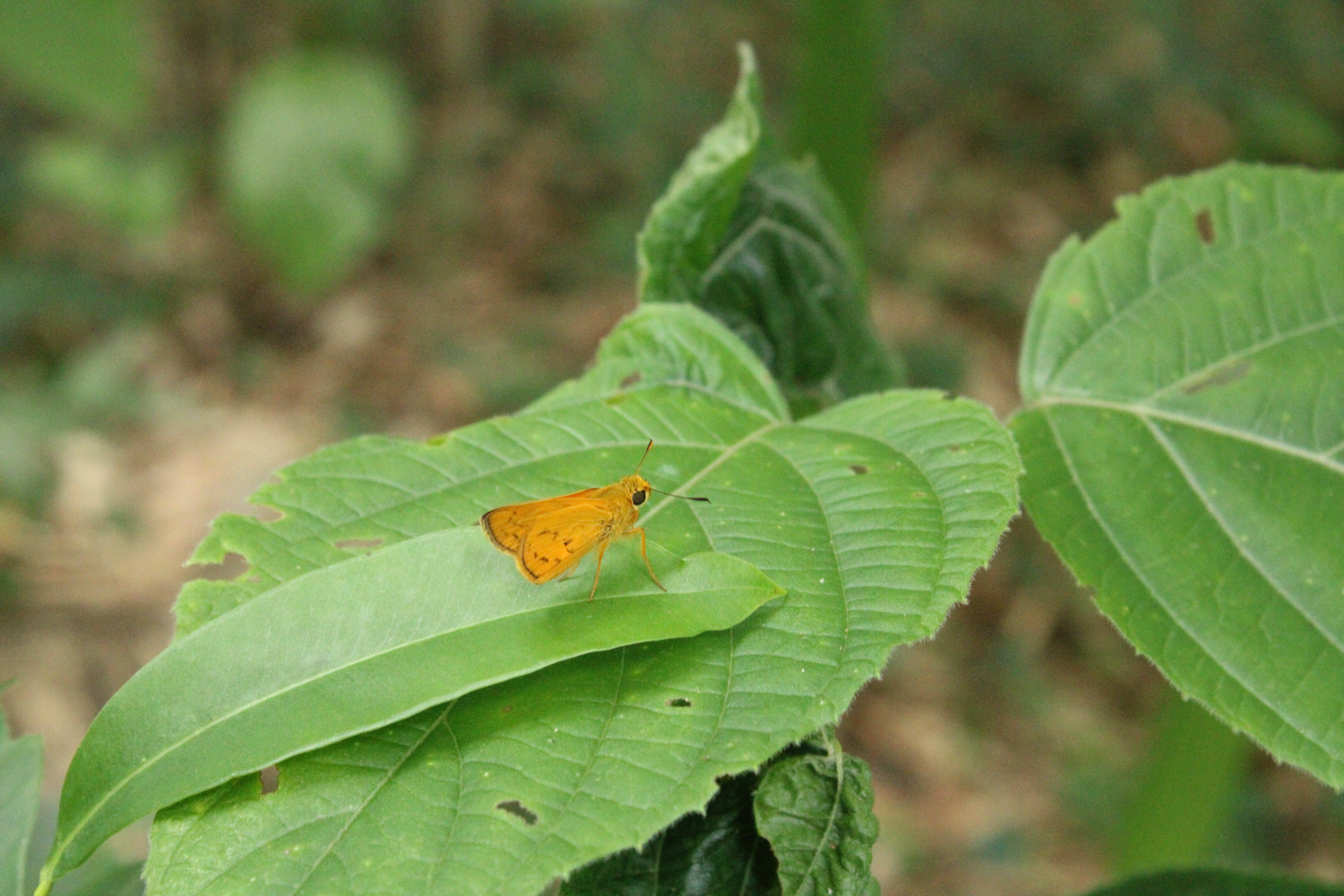
Potanthus confucius seen at Rajbari, Bangladesh in 2023
