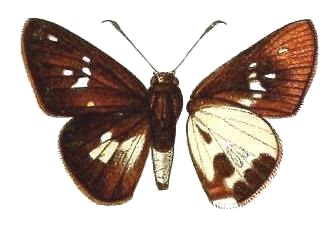
- male

Scientific classification
- Domain: Eukaryota
- Kingdom: Animalia
- Phylum: Arthropoda
- Class: Insecta
- Order: Lepidoptera
- Family: Hesperiidae
- Genus: Paronymus
- Species: P. nevea

Binomial name
- Paronymus nevea (H. H. Druce, 1910)

Synonyms
- Pardaleodes nevea H. H. Druce, 1910

= Paronymus nevea =

Scarce largest dart

Species of butterfly

Paronymus nevea, the scarce largest dart, is a butterfly in the family Hesperiidae. The species was first described by Hamilton Herbert Druce in 1910. It is found in Guinea, Ghana, Nigeria, Cameroon, the Central African Republic, the eastern part of the Democratic Republic of the Congo and north-western Zambia. The habitat consists of primary forests.
