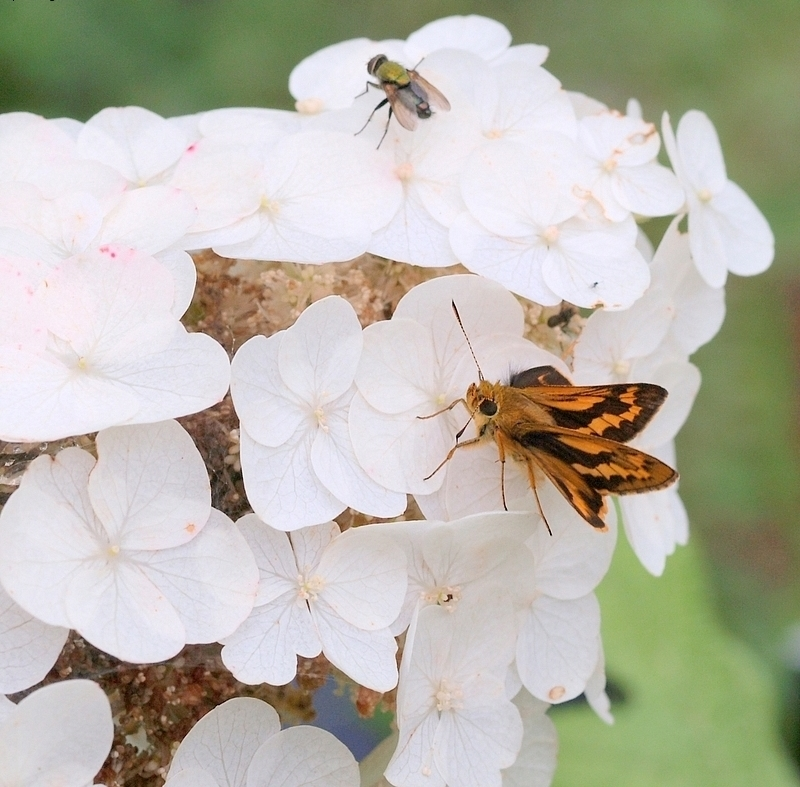

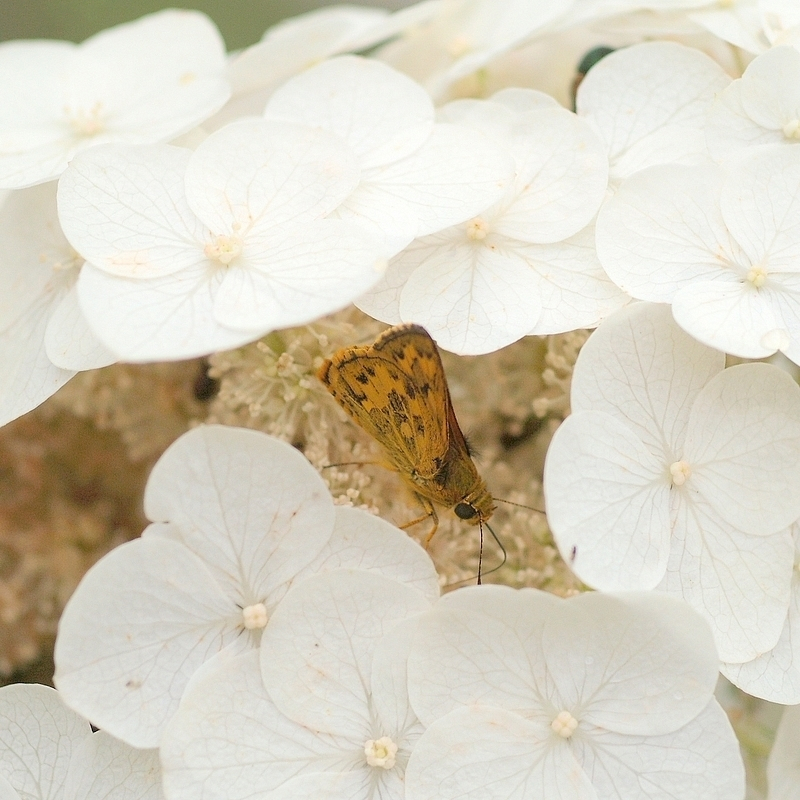

Scientific classification
- Kingdom: Animalia
- Phylum: Arthropoda
- Class: Insecta
- Order: Lepidoptera
- Family: Hesperiidae
- Genus: Potanthus
- Species: P. flavus

Binomial name
- Potanthus flavus (Murray, 1875)

Synonyms
- Pamphila flava Murray, 1875; Potanthus flava; Potanthus japonica Mabille, 1883; Padraona alcon Evans, 1932

= Potanthus flavus =

Species of butterfly

Potanthus flavus is a butterfly of the family Hesperiidae. It is found from the Amur region of Russia to Japan, as well as in Thailand, the Philippines and China (Jilin, Hebei, Shandong, Hunan, Fujian and Yunnan).

The wingspan is 27–30 mm.

== Subspecies ==
- Potanthus flavus flavus
- Potanthus flavus alcon Evans, 1932 (Thailand, Malaysia, Singapore)
