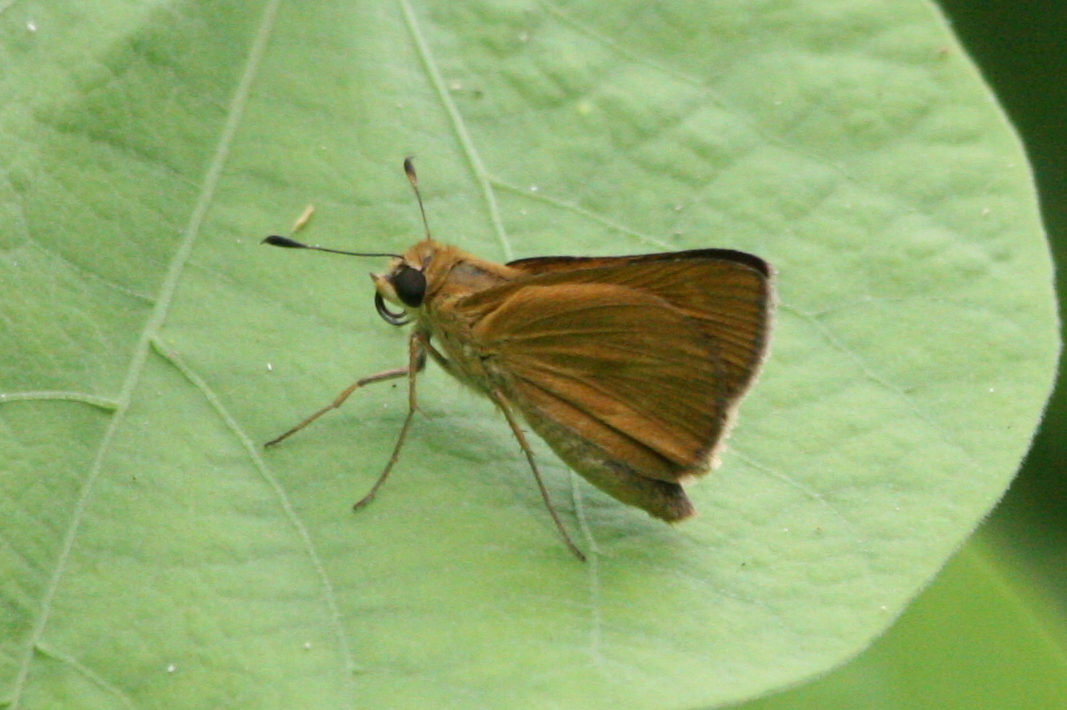

Conservation status
- Secure (NatureServe)

Scientific classification
- Kingdom: Animalia
- Phylum: Arthropoda
- Class: Insecta
- Order: Lepidoptera
- Family: Hesperiidae
- Genus: Nastra
- Species: N. julia

Binomial name
- Nastra julia (Freeman, 1945)

Synonyms
- Lerodea julia Freeman, 1945; Lerodea hoffmanni Bell, 1947

= Nastra julia =

Species of butterfly

Nastra julia, the Julia's skipper, is a species of butterfly in the family Hesperiidae. It is found in North America from southern Texas to central Mexico.

The wingspan is 24–29 mm. Adults are on wing year-round in southern Texas and from April to October in the rest of the range.

The larvae feed on Cynodon dactylon. Adults feed on flower nectar.

== Description ==
The upperside of the wing is dark brown. The forewing has 2 to 5 pale spots, while the hindwing is unmarked. The underside of the wing is yellow-brown and the veins are the same color. The wing span ranges from 15/16 to 1 1/8 inches or 2.4 to 2.9 centimeters.
