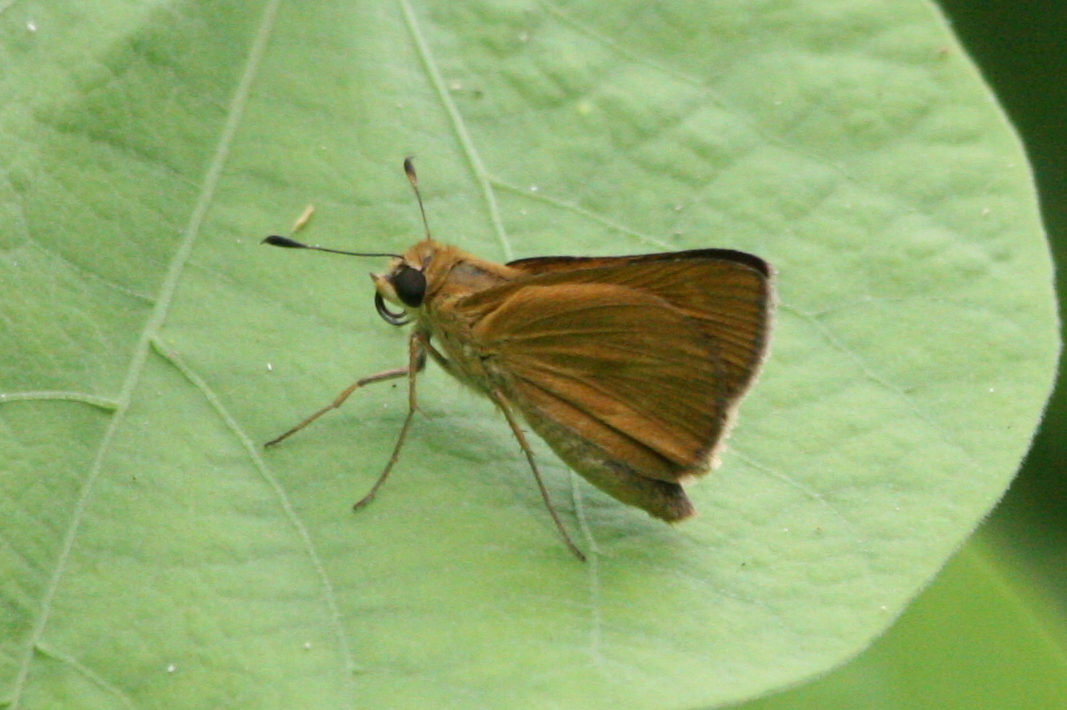
- Nastra julia

Scientific classification
- Kingdom: Animalia
- Phylum: Arthropoda
- Class: Insecta
- Order: Lepidoptera
- Family: Hesperiidae
- Subtribe: Moncina
- Genus: Nastra; Evans, 1955

= Nastra =

Genus of butterflies

Nastra is a genus of skipper butterflies in the family Hesperiidae.

== Species ==
Recognised species in the genus Nastra include:

- Nastra celeus (Mabille, 1891)
- Nastra chao (Mabille, 1898)
- Nastra ethologus (Hayward, 1934)
- Nastra julia (Freeman, 1945) - Julia's skipper
- Nastra leucone (Godman, 1900)
- Nastra lherminier (Latreille, [1824]) - Swarthy Skipper
- Nastra nappa (Evans, 1955)
- Nastra neamathla (Skinner and Williams, 1923) - Neamathla Skipper
- Nastra perigenes (Godman, 1900)
- Nastra subsordida (Mabille, 1891)
