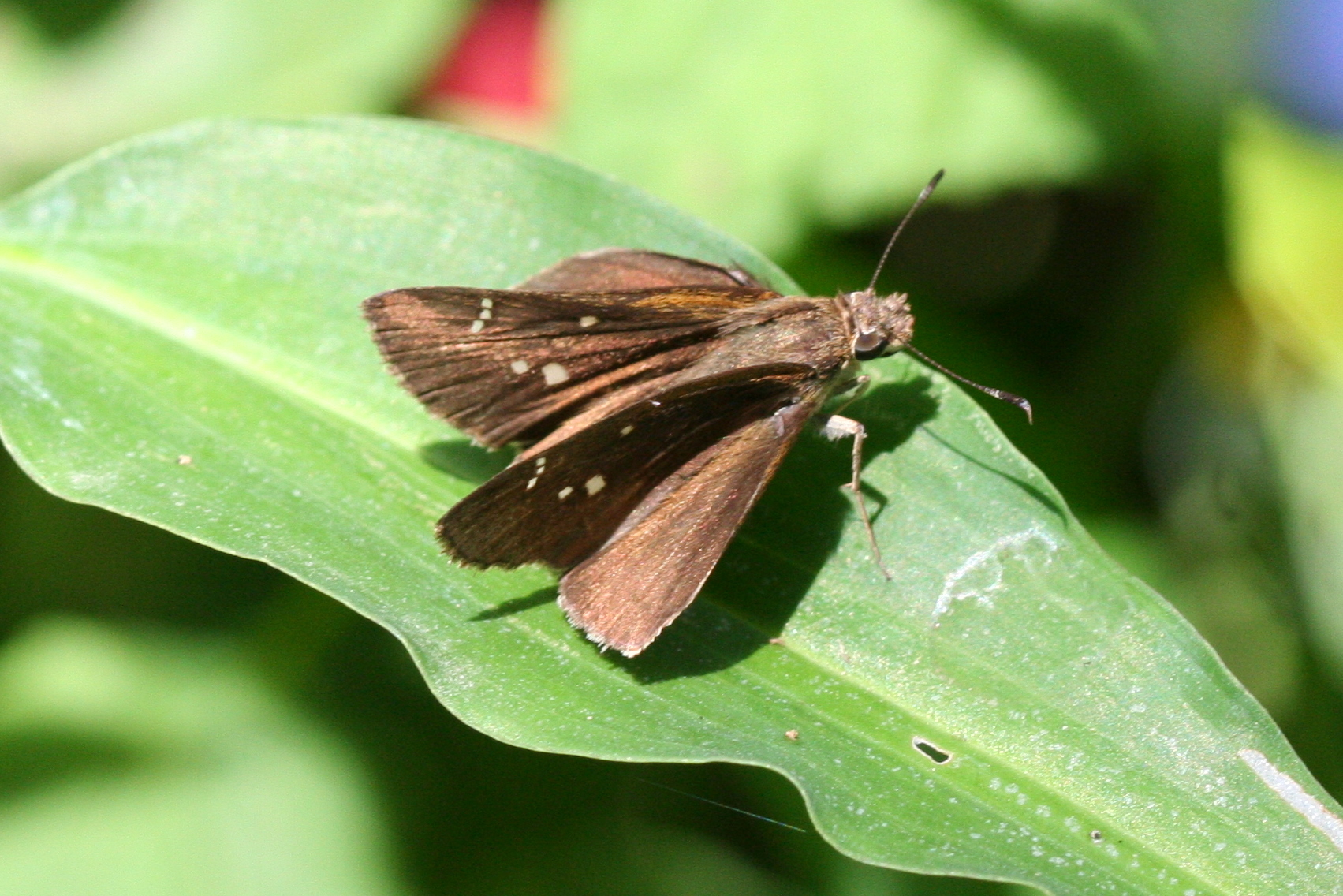

Scientific classification
- Kingdom: Animalia
- Phylum: Arthropoda
- Class: Insecta
- Order: Lepidoptera
- Family: Hesperiidae
- Genus: Decinea
- Species: D. percosius

Binomial name
- Decinea percosius (Godman, [1900])

Synonyms
- Cobalus percosius Godman, [1900]

= Decinea percosius =

Double-dotted skipper

Species of butterfly

Decinea percosius, the double-dotted skipper, is a species of butterfly of the family Hesperiidae. It is found from Belize north to Mexico. It is an occasional colonist up to the lower Rio Grande Valley in Texas, US.

== Description ==
The wings are dark brown. The upperside of the forewing has an angled transparent spot in the cell. The hindwing has one small transparent spot in the middle of the wing. The underside of the hindwing is yellow-brown. The wingspan is 22–35 millimetres (0.87–1.38 in). Adults are on wing from March to November in southern Texas and Mexico.

The larvae feed on various grasses. Adults feed on flower nectar.
