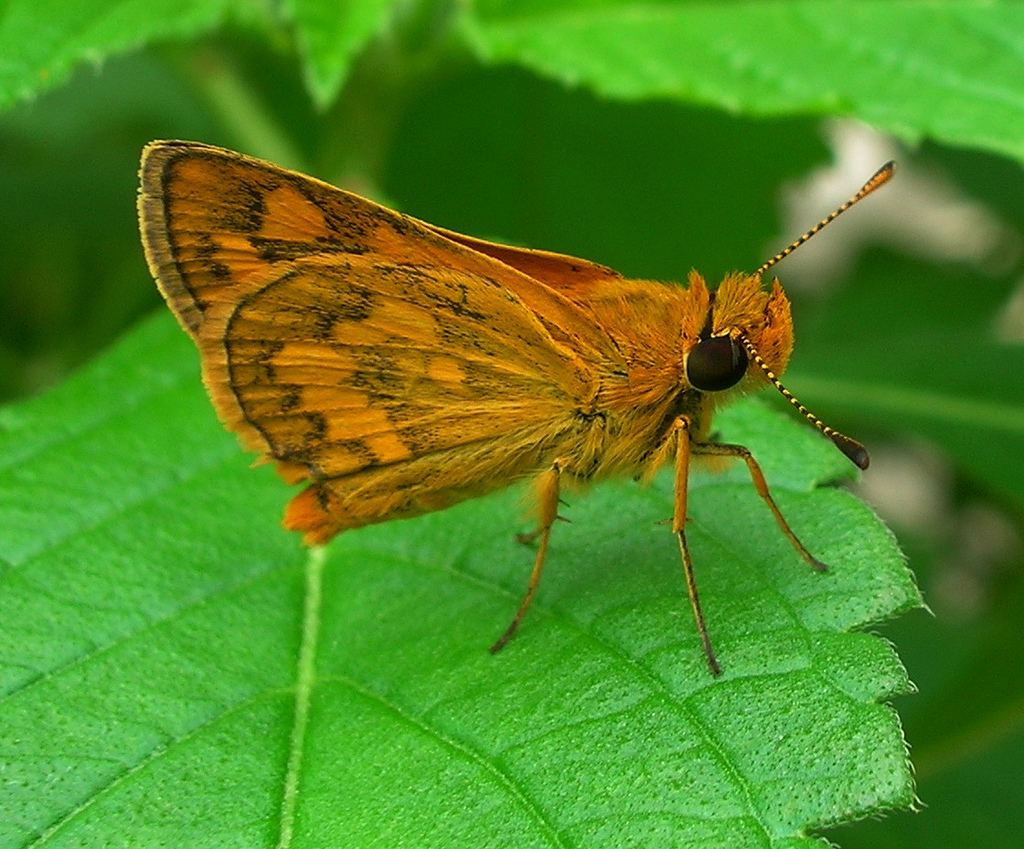
- The large dart (Potanthus serina) from Luzon, Philippines

Scientific classification
- Kingdom: Animalia
- Phylum: Arthropoda
- Clade: Pancrustacea
- Class: Insecta
- Order: Lepidoptera
- Family: Hesperiidae
- Subfamily: Hesperiinae
- Tribe: Taractrocerini
- Genus: Potanthus; Scudder, 1872

Species
- See text

Synonyms
- Padraona Moore, 1882; Inessa de Nicéville, 1897

= Potanthus =

Darts

Genus of butterflies

Potanthus is a large genus of skipper butterflies. They are commonly known as darts. They are found from South Asia to East Asia, and down to maritime Southeast Asia (though not extending towards New Guinea). It includes about 35 species, all of which look very similar to each other and are often only reliably identifiable through the examination of the male genitalia.

Potanthus species are sun-loving diurnal flyers. They are usually found in primary and secondary forests, as well as in partly cleared areas, grasslands, and near small villages. Occasionally they may be found in swamps and mangrove forests. The larvae feed on Bambusa (bamboo) and Dendrocalamus (both Gramineae). It includes the following species:

- Potanthus amor Evans, 1932 - Timor, Sumba, and Oinanaisa
- Potanthus chloe Eliot, 1960 - endemic to Malaysia
- Potanthus confucius (Chinese dart or Confucian dart)
- Potanthus dara (Kollar, 1845) - Himalayas, Indo-China, Malaysia
- Potanthus diffusus Hsu, Tsukiyama & Chiba, 2005 - endemic to Taiwan
- Potanthus fettingi (Möschler, 1878) - Sundaland, Sulawesi, and the Philippines
- Potanthus flavus (Murray, 1875) - Amur to Japan, China, the Philippines, and Thailand
- Potanthus juno (Evans, 1932) - Assam to the Malay Peninsula, Zhejiang
- Potanthus ganda (Fruhstorfer, 1911) - Assam, Indochina, southern China, Sundaland, and Calamian, Palawan
- Potanthus hetaerus (Mabille, 1883) - the Philippines, and Sulawesi
- Potanthus ilion (de Nicéville, 1897) - endemic to Lombok
- Potanthus lydia (Evans, 1934) - western China to the Malay Peninsula
- Potanthus mara (Evans, 1932) (Sikkim dart) - endemic to Tibet
- Potanthus motzui Hsu, Li & Li, 1990 - endemic to Taiwan
- Potanthus mingo (Edwards, 1866) - the Philippines, Java, Assam, Burma, Indochina, and Yunnan
- Potanthus miyashitai Fujioka & Tsukiyama, 1975 China, Japan
- Potanthus nesta (Evans, 1934) - Yunnan and Sichuan, China
- Potanthus niobe (Evans, 1934) - endemic to the Philippines
- Potanthus omaha (Edwards, 1863) - Burma to Indochina, Tawi-Tawi and Mindanao in the Philippines, Sulawesi and Sumbawa
- Potanthus pallida (Evans, 1932) (pallid dart) - Sri Lanka, India, southern China, and southern Thailand
- Potanthus palnia (Evans, 1914) (Palni dart) - the Palni Hills of southern India, Burma to Sumatra, southeastern Tibet and China
- Potanthus pamela (Evans, 1934) Thailand, Peninsular Malaya, Sumatra, Java, Bali, Borneo, Sulawesi ?
- Potanthus parvus Johnson & Johnson, 1980 Indochina
- Potanthus pava (Fruhstorfer, 1911) (Pava dart) - Taiwan, India, Indochina, Malay Peninsula, Philippines, and Sulawesi
- Potanthus pseudomaesa (Moore, 1882)(Indian dart) - lower Himalayas, India, Sri Lanka, Yunnan
- Potanthus rectifasciata (Elwes & Edwards, 1897) (branded dart) - Sikkim to the Malay Peninsula, Yunnan
- Potanthus riefenstahli Huang, 2003 - Yunnan
- Potanthus serina Plötz, 1883) (large dart) - Burma to Indochina, the Philippines
- Potanthus sita (Evans, 1932) Sikkim
- Potanthus taqini Huang, 2001 - endemic to Tibet
- Potanthus tibetana Huang, 2002 - Tibet and Yunnan
- Potanthus trachala (Mabille, 1878) - India, Indochina, Malaysia, and southern China
- Potanthus upadhana (Fruhstorfer, 1911) - Java, Lombok
- Potanthus wilemanni (Evans, 1934) - Taiwan
- Potanthus yani Huang, 2002 - China

== Gallery ==
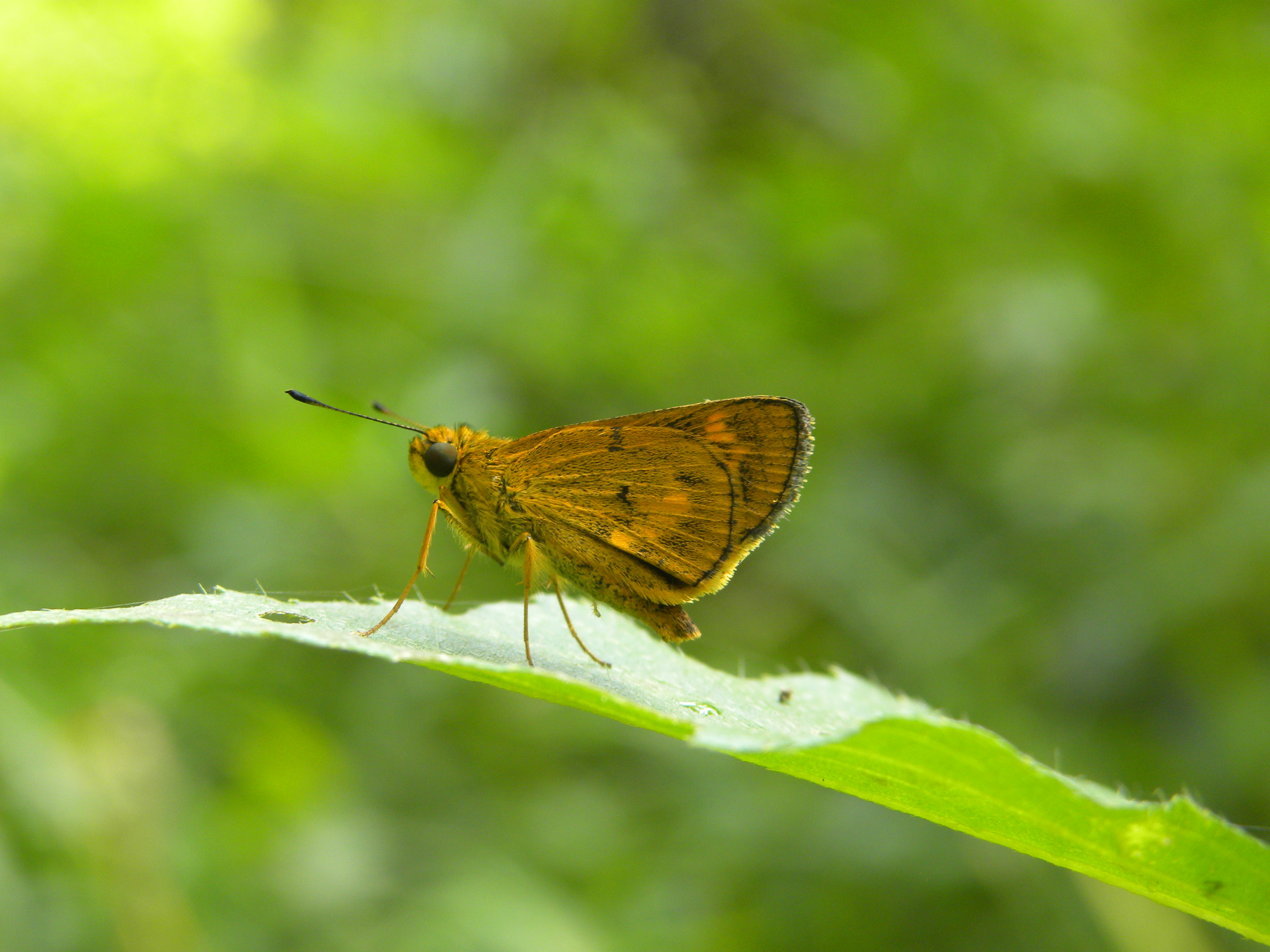
The Indian dart (Potanthus pseudomaesa) from Kerala, India

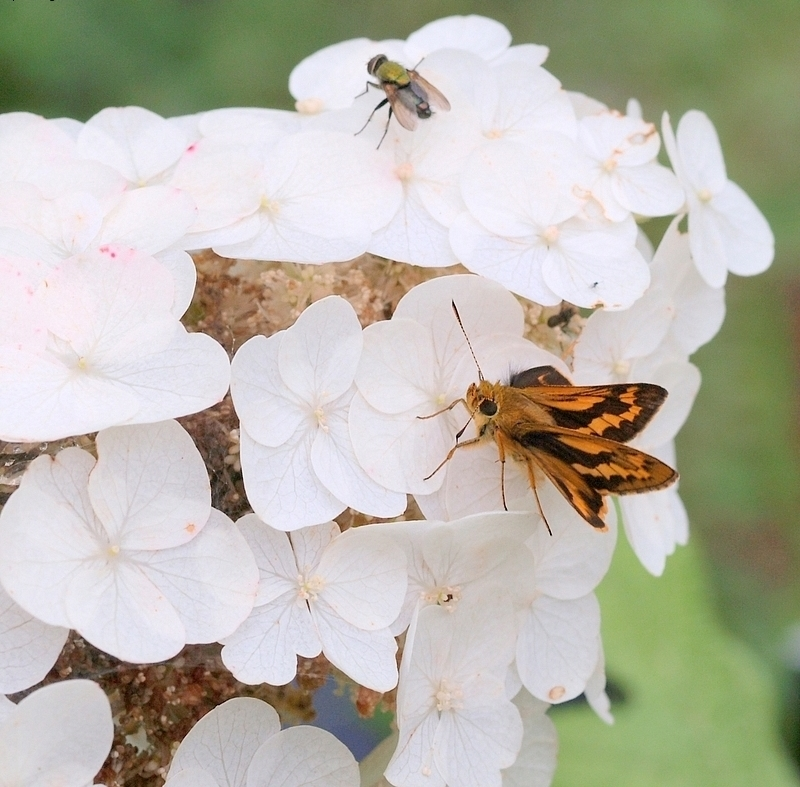
Potanthus flavus from Japan

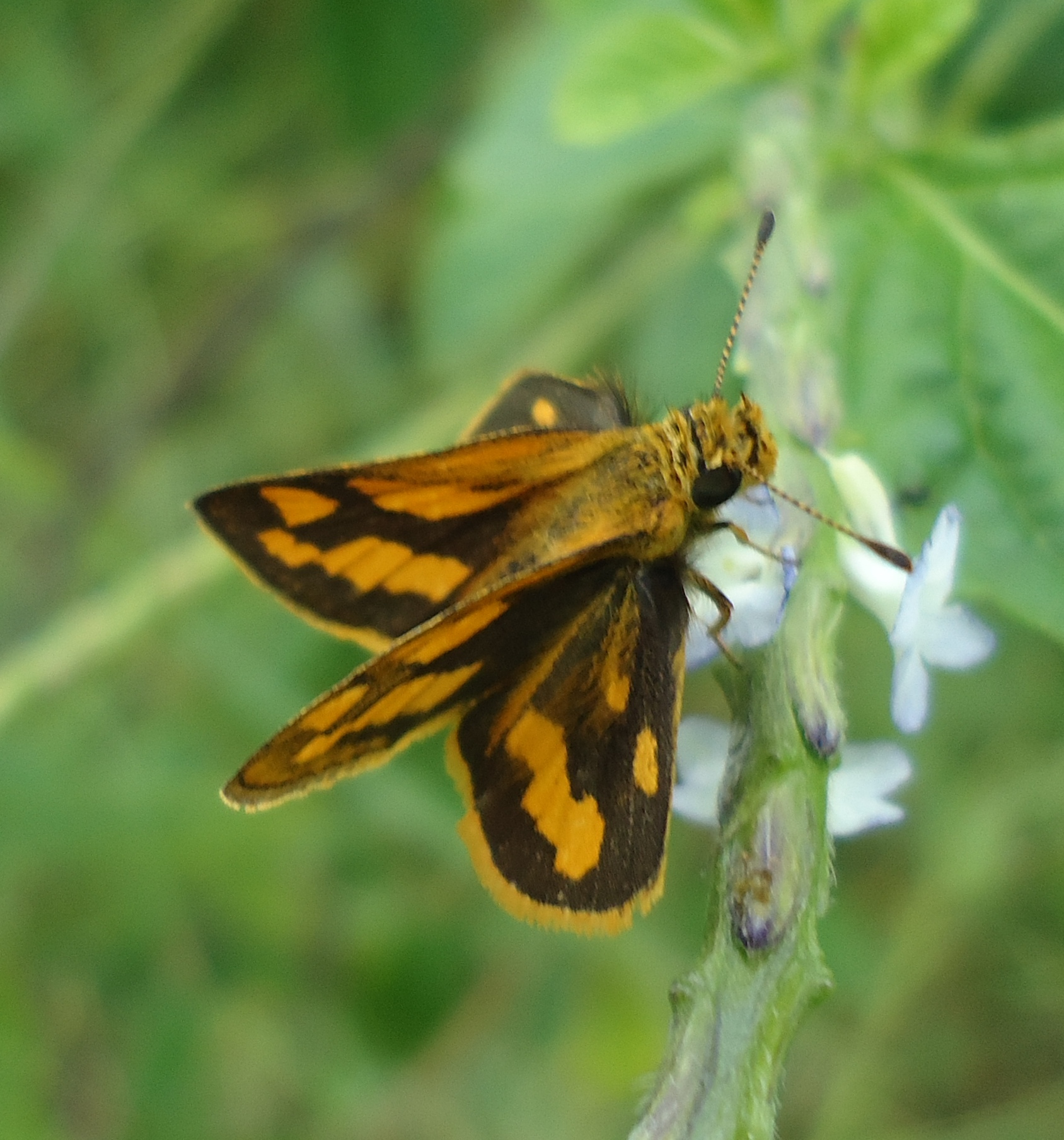
Potanthus niobe from Mindanao, Philippines

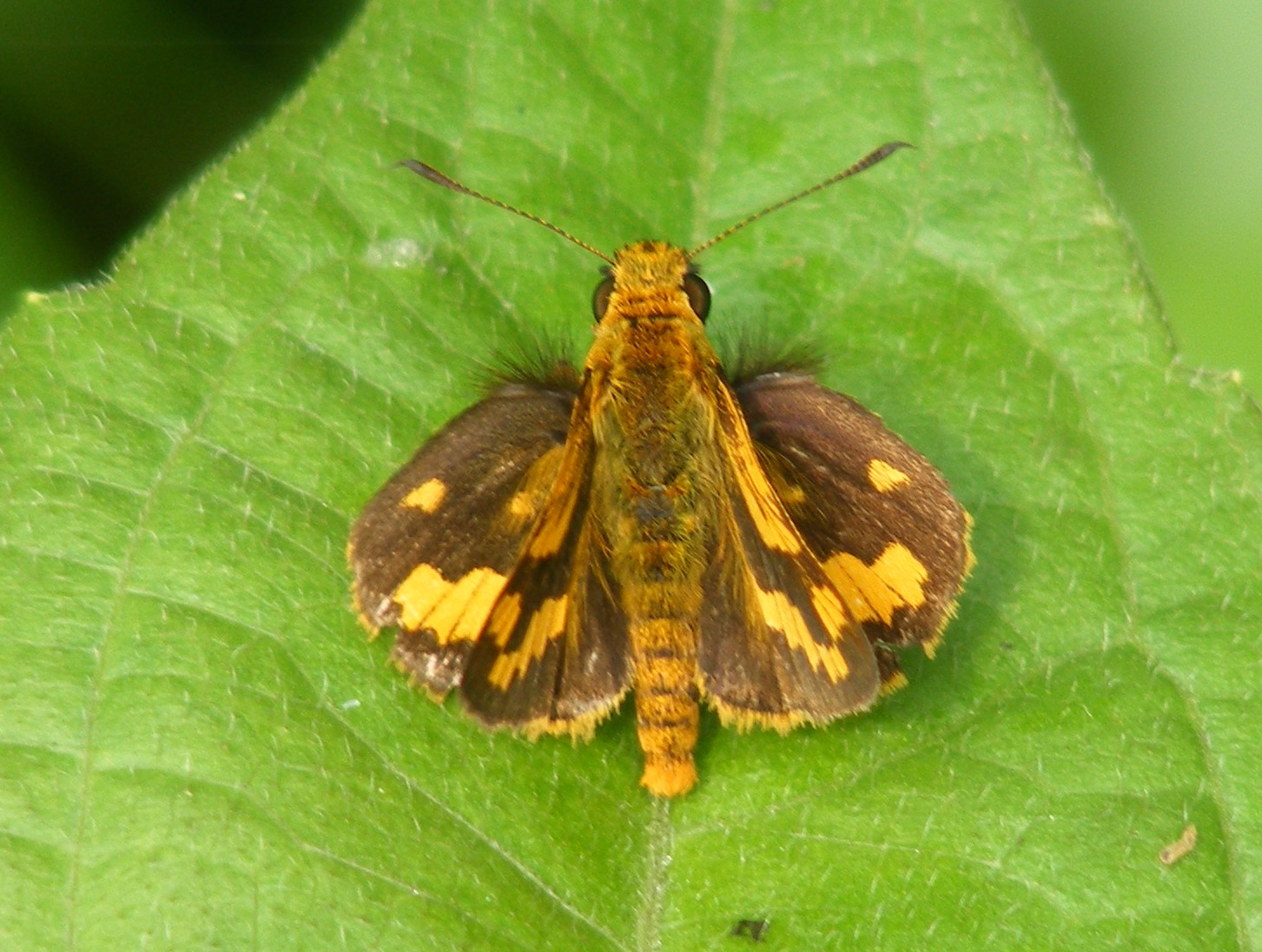
Potanthus omaha from Singapore

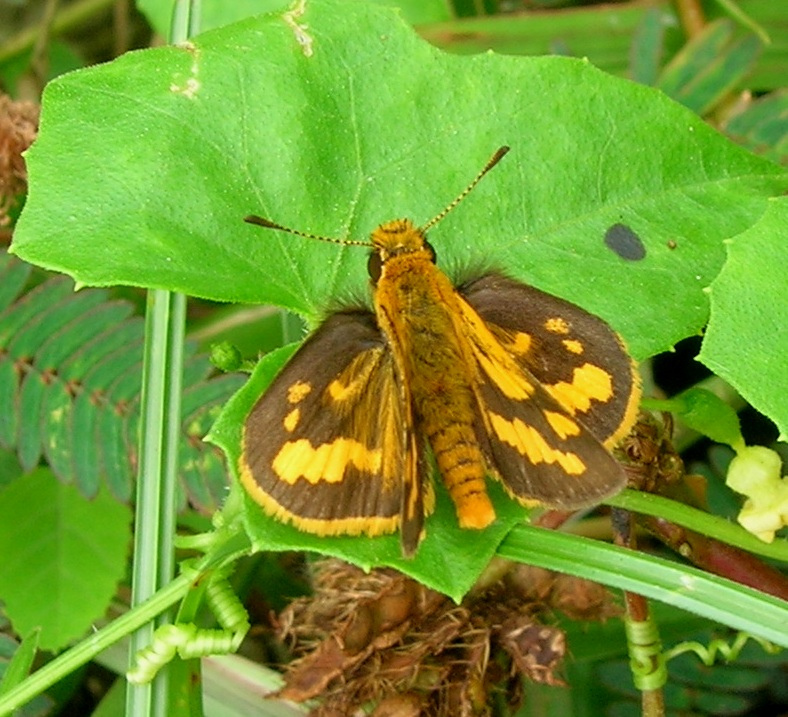
Potanthus pava from Luzon, Philippines
