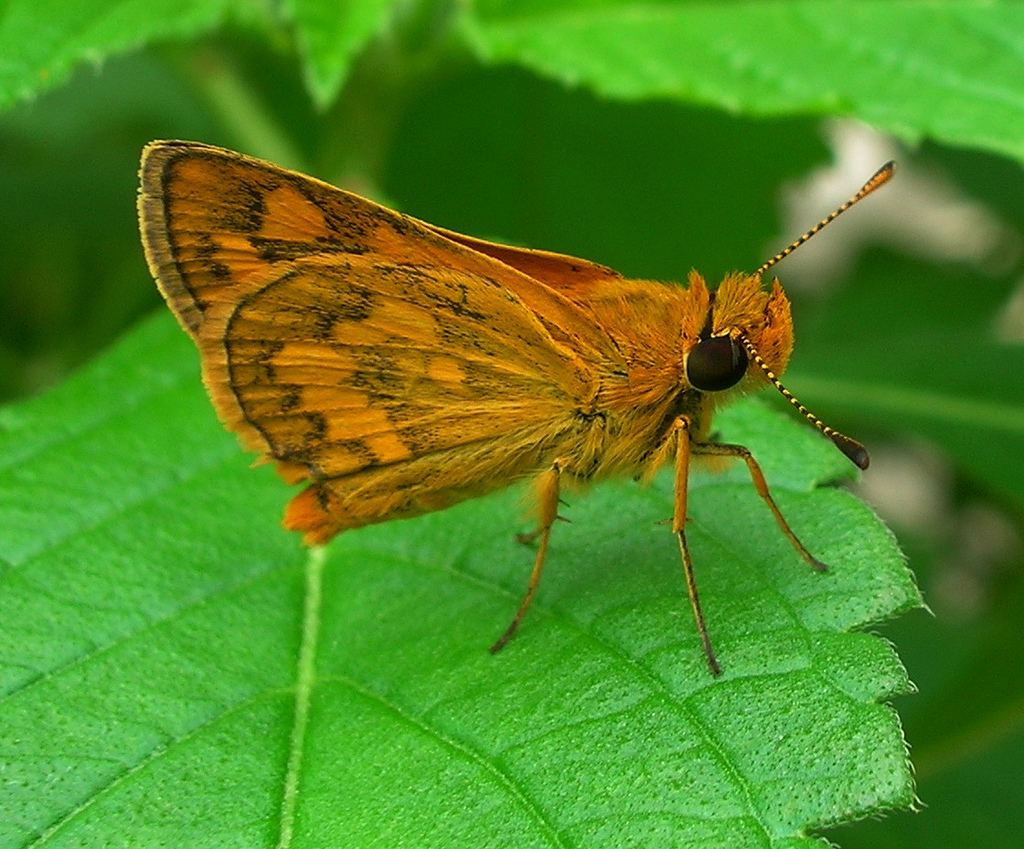

Scientific classification
- Kingdom: Animalia
- Phylum: Arthropoda
- Class: Insecta
- Order: Lepidoptera
- Family: Hesperiidae
- Genus: Potanthus
- Species: P. serina

Binomial name
- Potanthus serina Plötz, 1883

= Potanthus serina =

Species of butterfly

Potanthus serina, the large dart, is a species of butterfly of the family Hesperiidae. It is found on the Andamans, as well as in southern Burma, Singapore and the Philippines. The habitat consists of grassy areas and mangrove areas.

The wingspan is about 35 millimetres (1.4 in), making it the largest species in the genus Potanthus.

== Taxonomy ==
It was formerly treated as a subspecies of Potanthus hetaerus.
