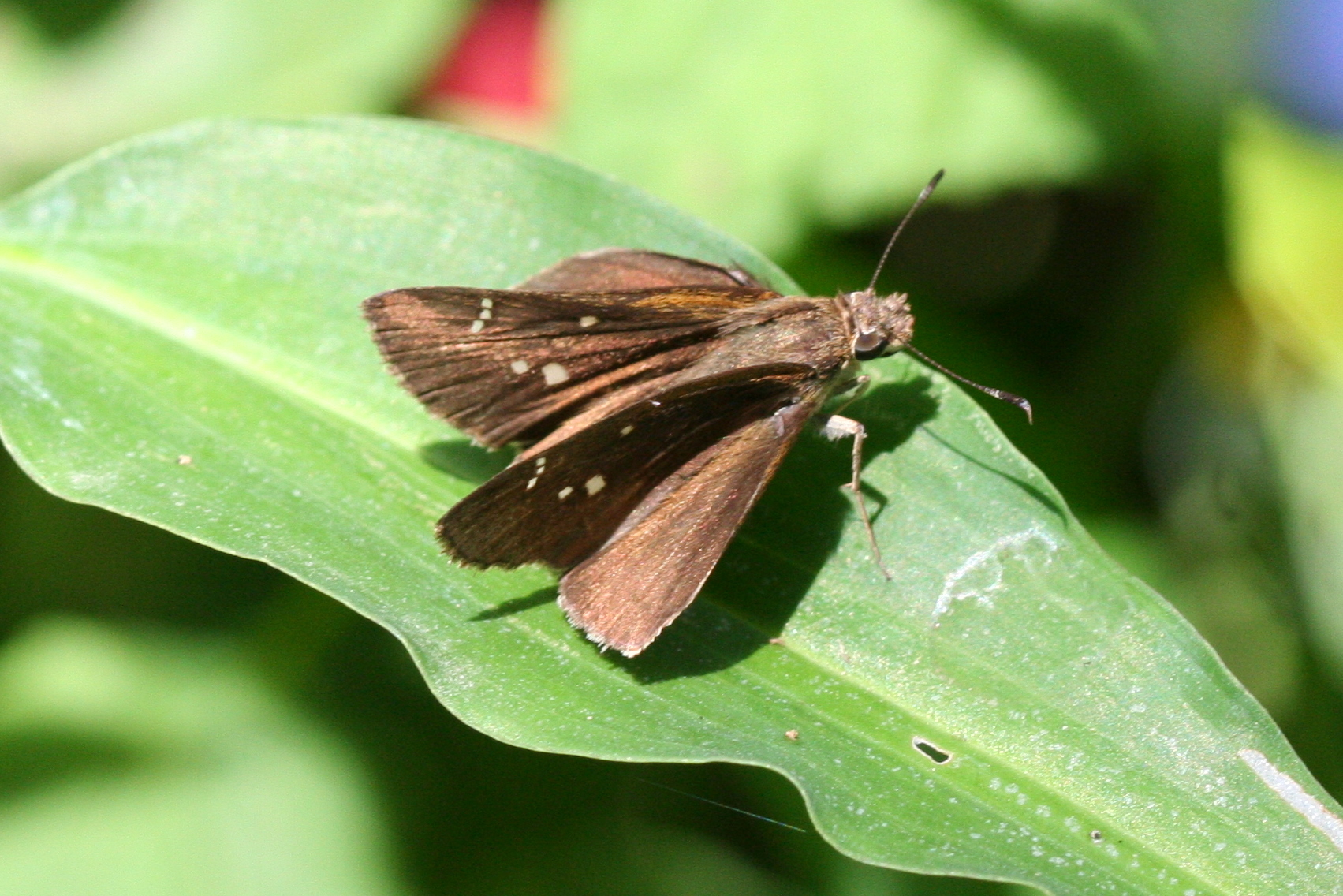
- Double-dotted skipper (D. percosius)
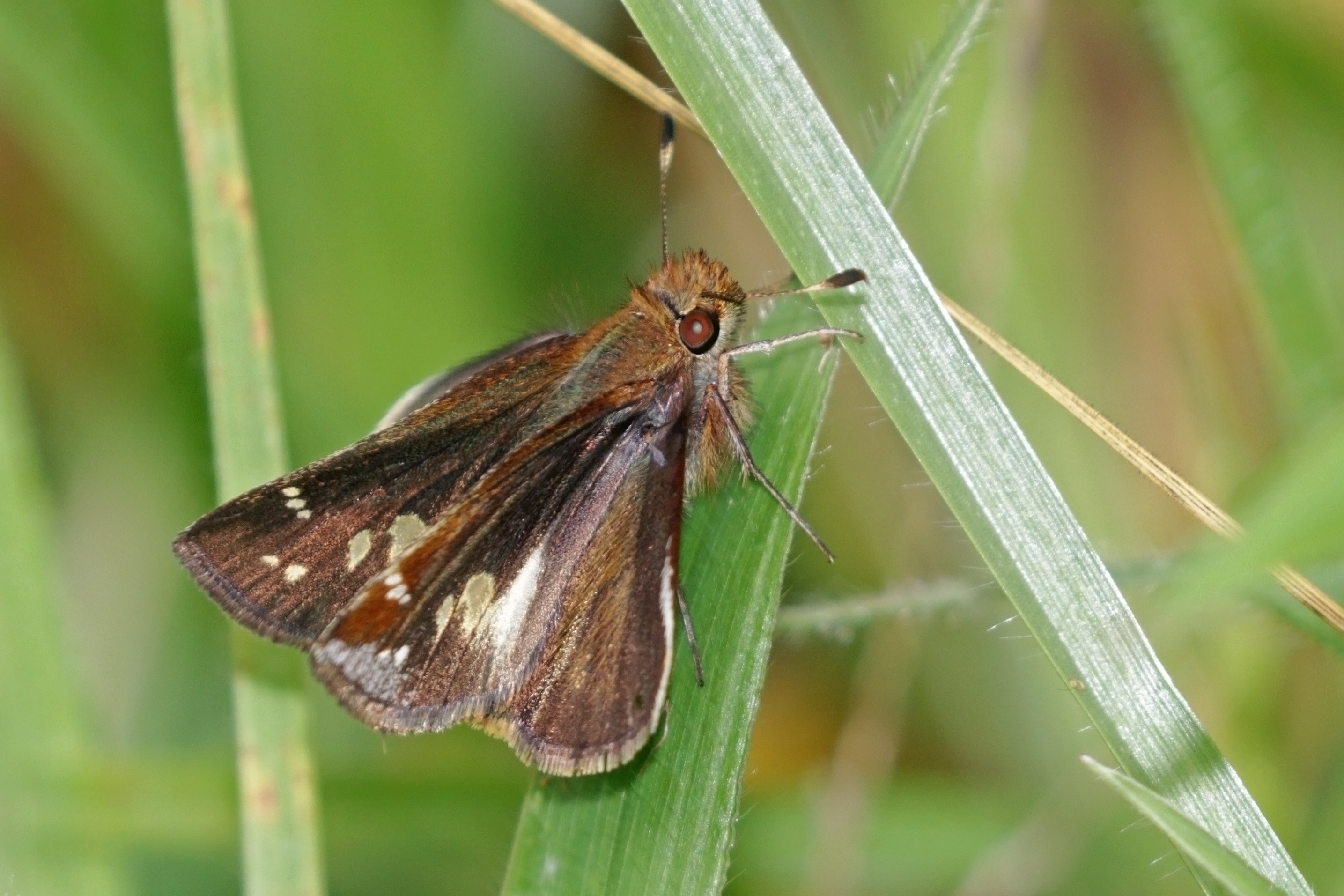
- Lucifer skipper (D. lucifer) female

Scientific classification
- Kingdom: Animalia
- Phylum: Arthropoda
- Class: Insecta
- Order: Lepidoptera
- Family: Hesperiidae
- Tribe: Hesperiini
- Genus: Decinea; Evans, 1955

= Decinea =

Genus of butterflies

Decinea is a Neotropical genus of skippers in the family Hesperiidae.

== Species ==
Recognised species in the genus Decinea include:

- Decinea antus (Mabille, 1895)
- Decinea colombiana Grishin, 2022)
- Decinea dama (Herrich-Schäffer, 1869)
- Decinea decinea (Hewitson, 1876)
- Decinea denta Evans, 1955
- Decinea formosus (Hayward, 1940)
- Decinea huasteca (Freeman, 1969)
- Decinea lydora (Plötz, 1882)
- Decinea milesi (Weeks, 1901)
- Decinea notata Grishin, 2023
- Decinea onasima (Hewitson, 1877)
- Decinea zapota Evans, 1955

Since transferred

- Decinea neroides (Herrich-Schäffer, 1869) => Lindra neroides (Herrich-Schäffer, 1869)
- Decinea lucifer (Hübner, [1831]) => Oligoria lucifer (Hübner, [1831])
- Decinea mammaea (Hewitson, 1876) => Testia mammaea (Hewitson, 1876)
- Decinea mustea Freeman, 1979 => Oligoria mustea (Freeman, 1979)
- Decinea percosius (Godman, 1900) => Oligoria percosius (Godman, 1900)
- Decinea rindgei Freeman, 1969 => Oligoria rindgei (Freeman, 1969)
