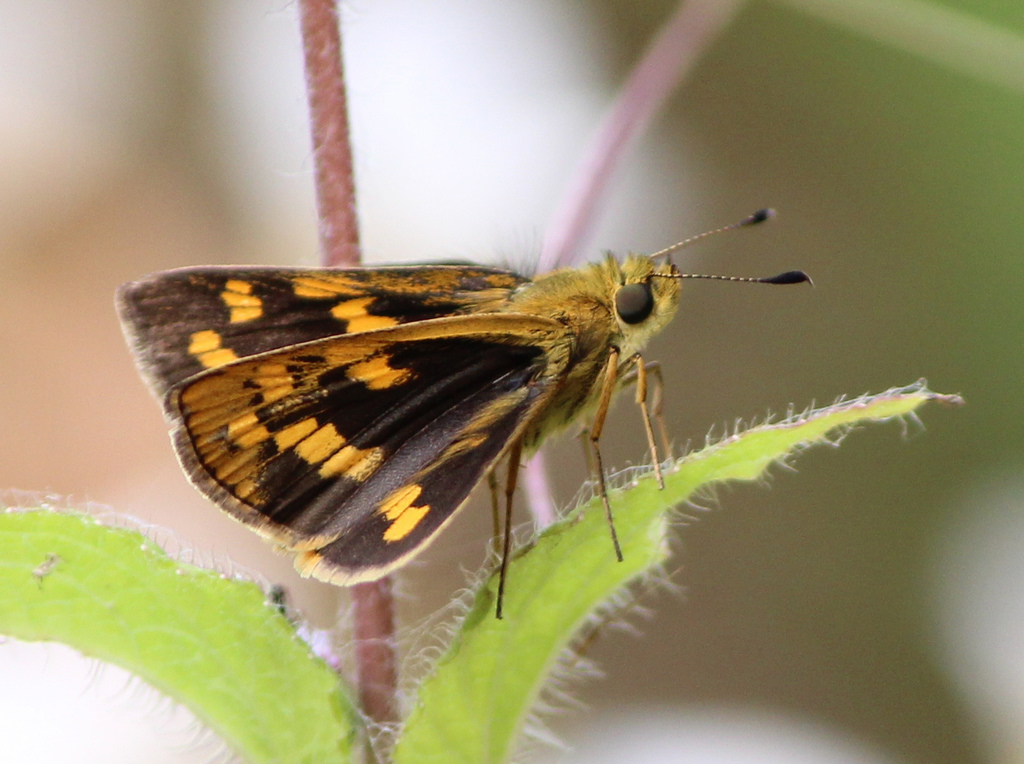

Scientific classification
- Kingdom: Animalia
- Phylum: Arthropoda
- Class: Insecta
- Order: Lepidoptera
- Family: Hesperiidae
- Genus: Potanthus
- Species: P. palnia

Binomial name
- Potanthus palnia (Evans, 1914)

= Potanthus palnia =

Species of butterfly

Potanthus palnia, commonly known as the Palni dart, is a butterfly belonging to the family Hesperiidae found in India and Indochina.
