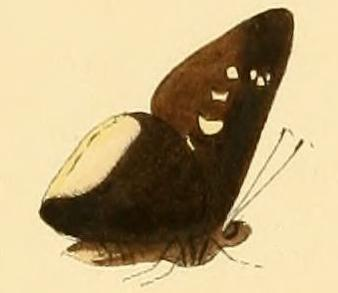

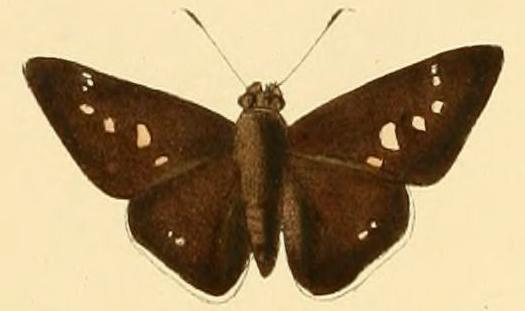

Scientific classification
- Kingdom: Animalia
- Phylum: Arthropoda
- Class: Insecta
- Order: Lepidoptera
- Family: Hesperiidae
- Genus: Eutychide
- Species: E. physcella

Binomial name
- Eutychide physcella (Hewitson, [1866])

Synonyms
- Hesperia physcella Hewitson, [1866]; Cobalus physcella f. unipunctana Hayward, 1934

= Eutychide physcella =

Species of butterfly

Eutychide physcella is a butterfly in the family Hesperiidae. It is found in Brazil (Rio de Janeiro) and Argentina.
