= Decinea decinea =

Scientific classification
- Kingdom: Animalia
- Phylum: Arthropoda
- Class: Insecta
- Order: Lepidoptera
- Family: Hesperiidae
- Genus: Decinea
- Species: D. decinea

Binomial name
- Decinea decinea (Hewitson, 1876)

Synonyms
- Hesperia decinea Hewitson, 1876; Hesperia nanneta Plötz, 1882; Cobalus huntingtoni (Bell, 1930); Tirynthia huasteca Freeman, 1969

Species of butterfly

Decinea decinea is a species of butterfly of the family Hesperiidae. It is found from South America (Brazil, Venezuela).

== Subspecies ==
- Decinea decinea decinea (Brazil: Rio de Janeiro, Paraná)
- Decinea decinea derisor (Venezuela)
