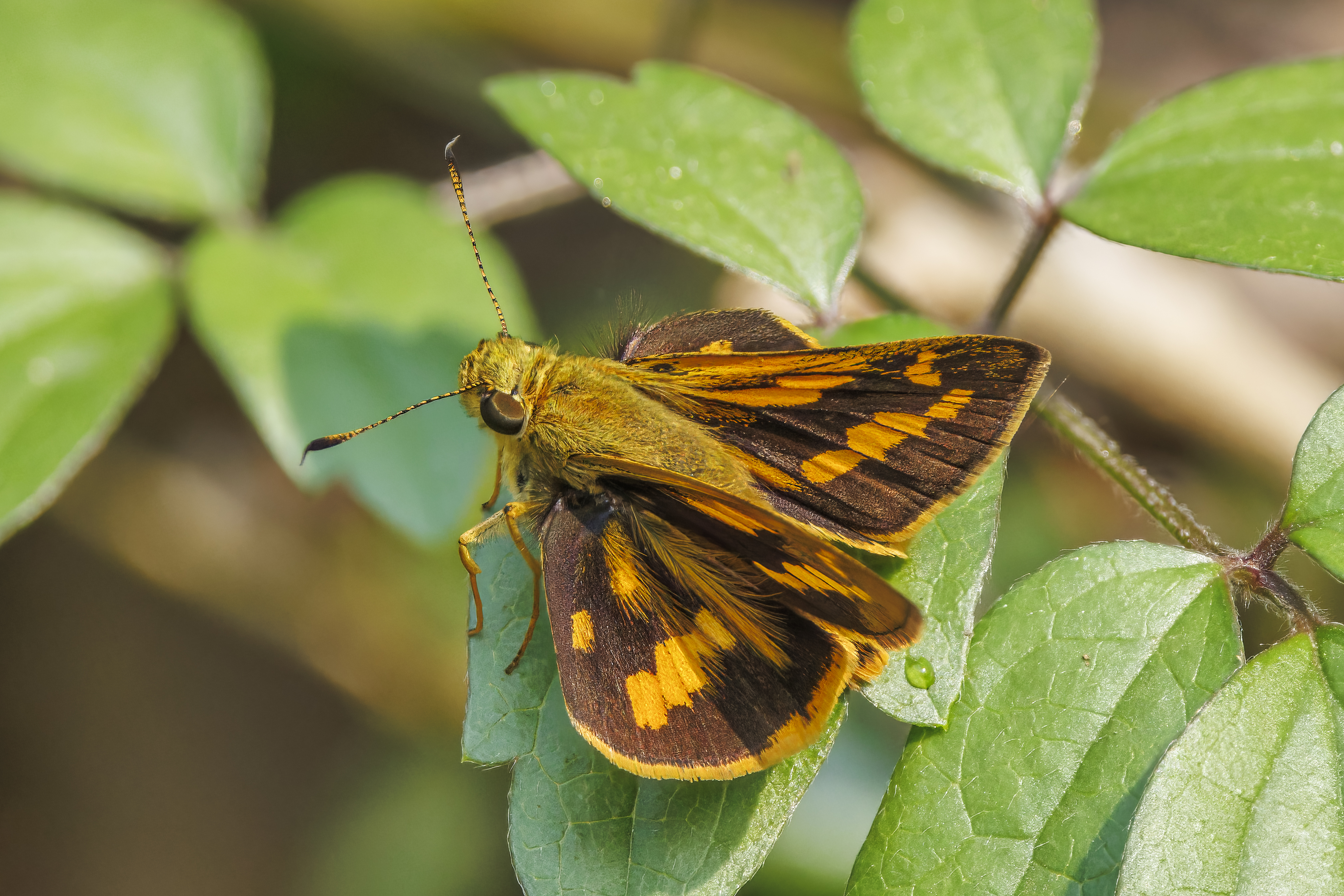
- from Laos

Scientific classification
- Kingdom: Animalia
- Phylum: Arthropoda
- Clade: Pancrustacea
- Class: Insecta
- Order: Lepidoptera
- Family: Hesperiidae
- Genus: Potanthus
- Species: P. omaha

Binomial name
- Potanthus omaha (H. Edwards, 1863)

Synonyms
- Hesperia omaha H. Edwards, 1863; Pamphila maesoides Butler, 1879; Padraona maesoides Moore, 1882

= Potanthus omaha =

Lesser dart

Species of butterfly

Potanthus omaha, commonly known as the lesser dart, is a species of skipper butterflies. It is found in Australia, Indochina, Malaysia, Singapore, the Philippines, India and Indonesia. It includes the following subspecies:

- Potanthus omaha bione Evans, 1949 - endemic to Mindanao, Philippines
- Potanthus omaha copia (Evans, 1932)
- Potanthus omaha omaha (H. Edwards, 1863)
- Potanthus omaha maesina (Evans, 1934) - occurs mainly in Borneo but also found in the Tawi-tawi, Philippines
- Potanthus omaha nita (Evans, 1934) - found in Indonesia, Indonesia; possibly conspecific to P. o. bione.

== Description ==
The recto ground colour dark is dark brown with sharply contrasted bright orange-yellow markings. The verso is black, with the wings again marked yellow. The costal half of the forewing and of the hindwing is heavily dusted with yellowish scales. It is a small skipper (wingspan) 20-24 mm.) It is only reliably identifiable through the examination of the male genitalia.
