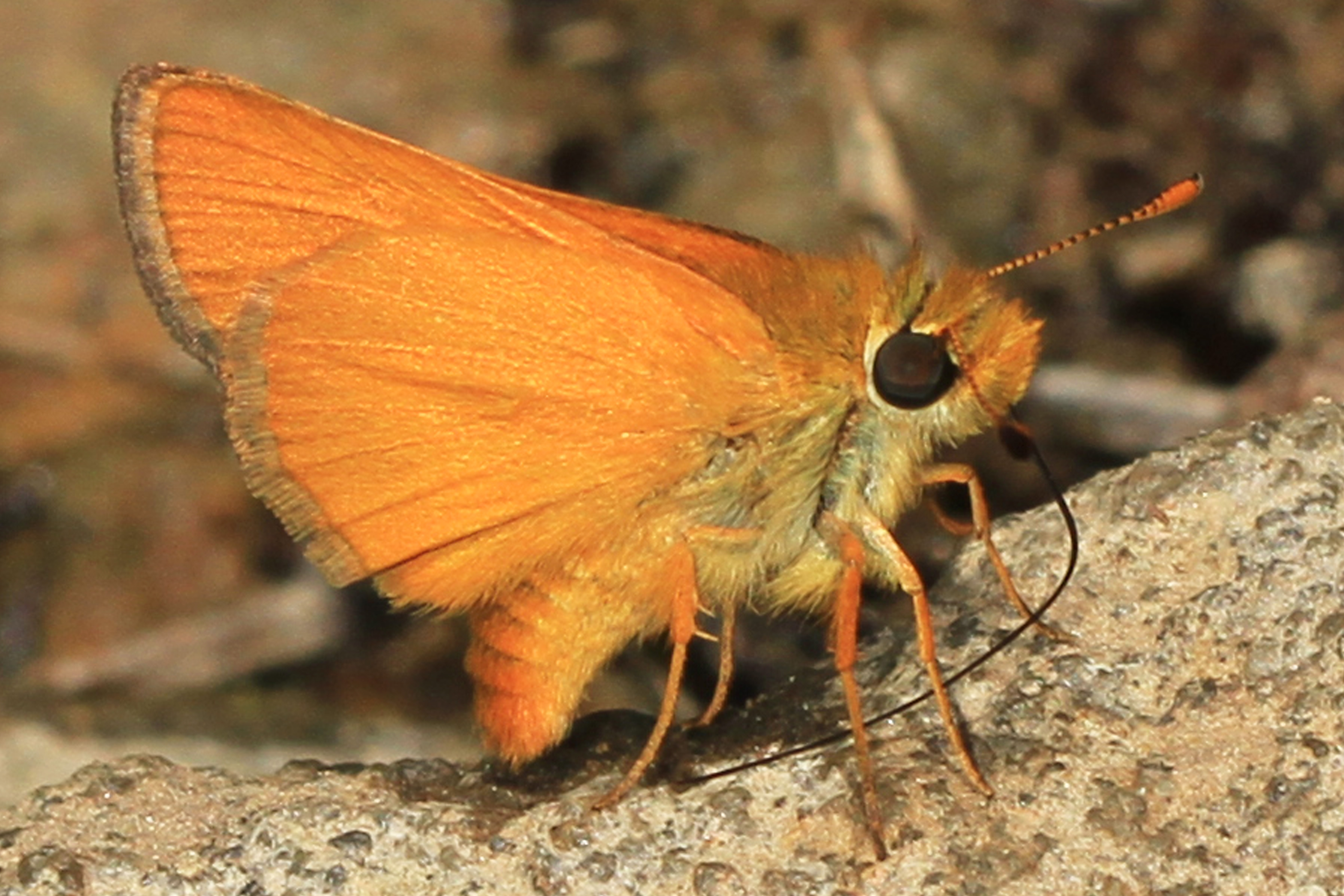

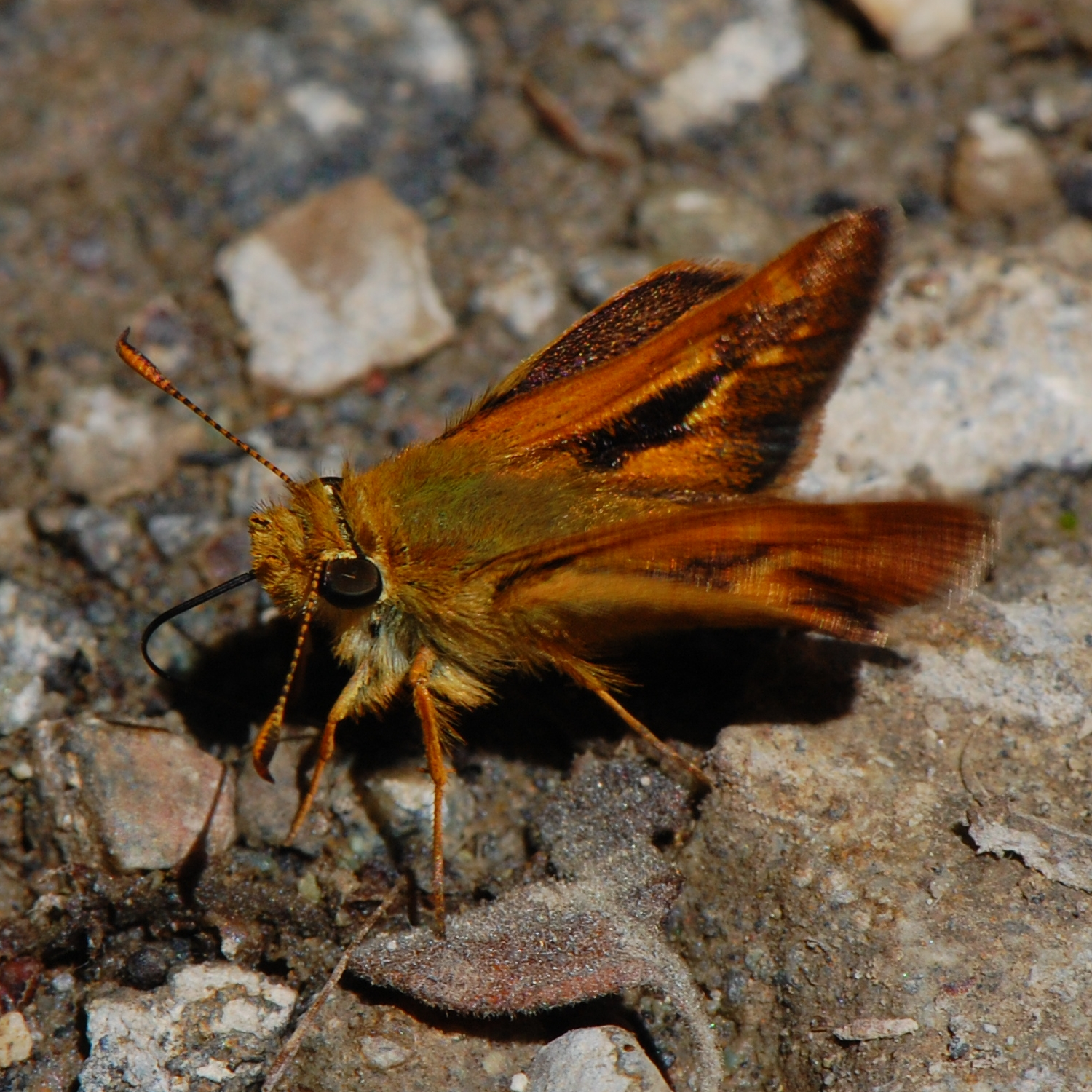

Conservation status
- Secure (NatureServe)

Scientific classification
- Kingdom: Animalia
- Phylum: Arthropoda
- Class: Insecta
- Order: Lepidoptera
- Family: Hesperiidae
- Genus: Ochlodes
- Species: O. agricola

Binomial name
- Ochlodes agricola (Boisduval, 1852)

= Ochlodes agricola =

Species of butterfly

Ochlodes agricola, the rural skipper, is a species of grass skipper in the butterfly family Hesperiidae. It is found in North America.

Ochlodes agricola is found in mid-elevation habitats and foothills. Adults are ochre-orange. Males have diagonal black markings on fore wings. The underside of the hind wings are solid orange or mottled with brown. Adult males display territorial behavior. Larvae feed on grasses and are yellow with black lines and a black head.

The MONA or Hodges number for Ochlodes agricola is 4055.

== Subspecies ==
These three subspecies belong to the species Ochlodes agricola:

- Ochlodes agricola agricola (Boisduval, 1852)
- Ochlodes agricola nemorum (Boisduval, 1852)
- Ochlodes agricola verus (W. H. Edwards, 1881)
