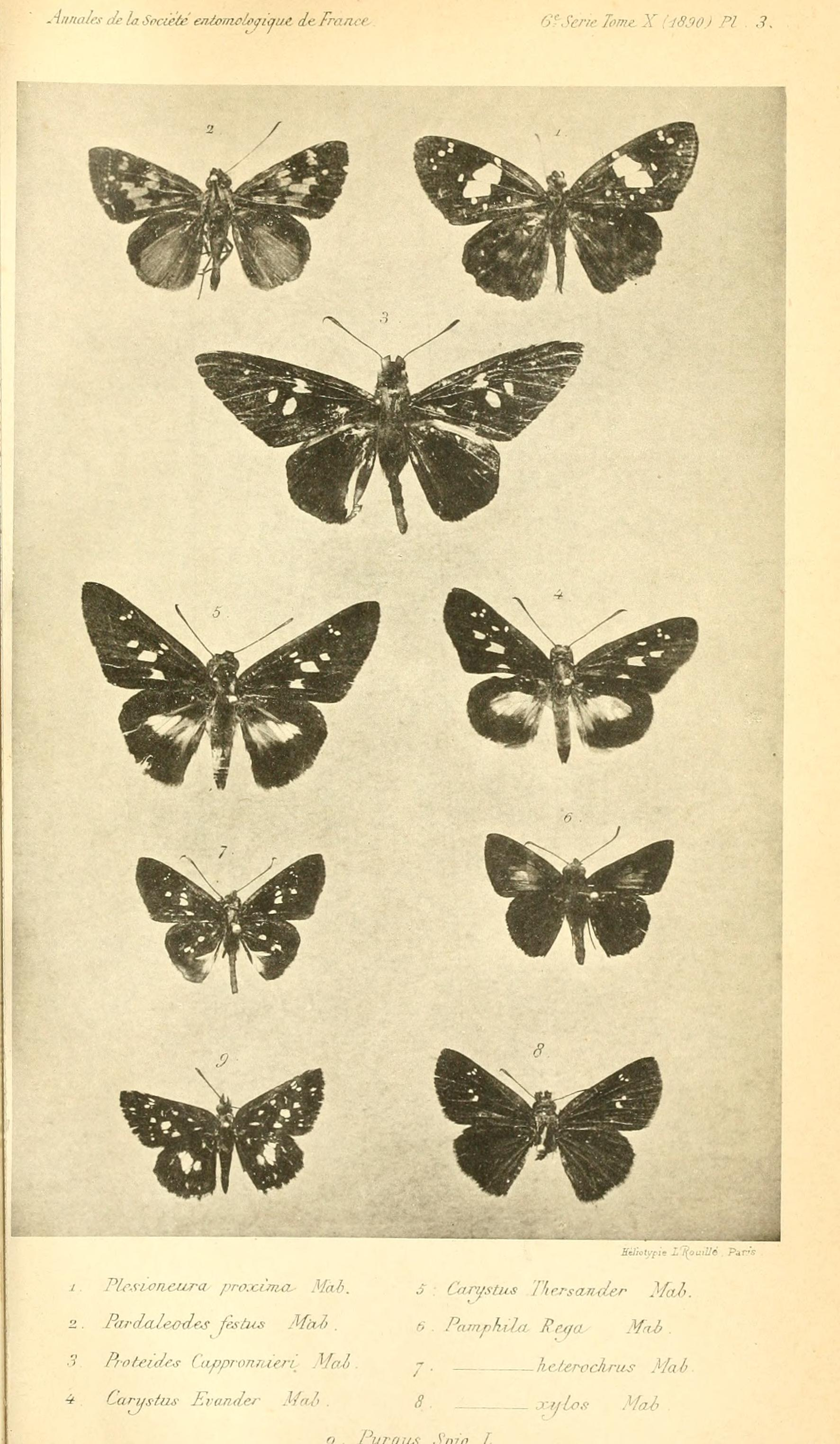

Scientific classification
- Domain: Eukaryota
- Kingdom: Animalia
- Phylum: Arthropoda
- Class: Insecta
- Order: Lepidoptera
- Family: Hesperiidae
- Genus: Paronymus
- Species: P. ligora

Binomial name
- Paronymus ligora (Hewitson, 1876)

Synonyms
- Hesperia ligora Hewitson, 1876; Carystus thersander Mabille, 1890

= Paronymus ligora =

Species of butterfly

Paronymus ligora, the largest dart, is a butterfly in the family Hesperiidae. It is found in Guinea, Sierra Leone, Ivory Coast, Ghana, Togo, Nigeria, Cameroon, Gabon, the Central African Republic, Angola, the Democratic Republic of the Congo and Uganda. The habitat consists of forests.
