= Oenides =

Oenides vulpina

Scientific classification
- Kingdom: Animalia
- Phylum: Arthropoda
- Clade: Pancrustacea
- Class: Insecta
- Order: Lepidoptera
- Family: Hesperiidae
- Subfamily: Hesperiinae
- Tribe: Pericharini
- Genus: Oenides; Mabille, 1904
- Species: O. vulpina

Binomial name
- Oenides vulpina (C. & R. Felder, 1867)

Genus of butterflies

Oenides is a genus of skippers in the family Hesperiidae. It is monotypic, being represented by the single species Oenides vulpina.
