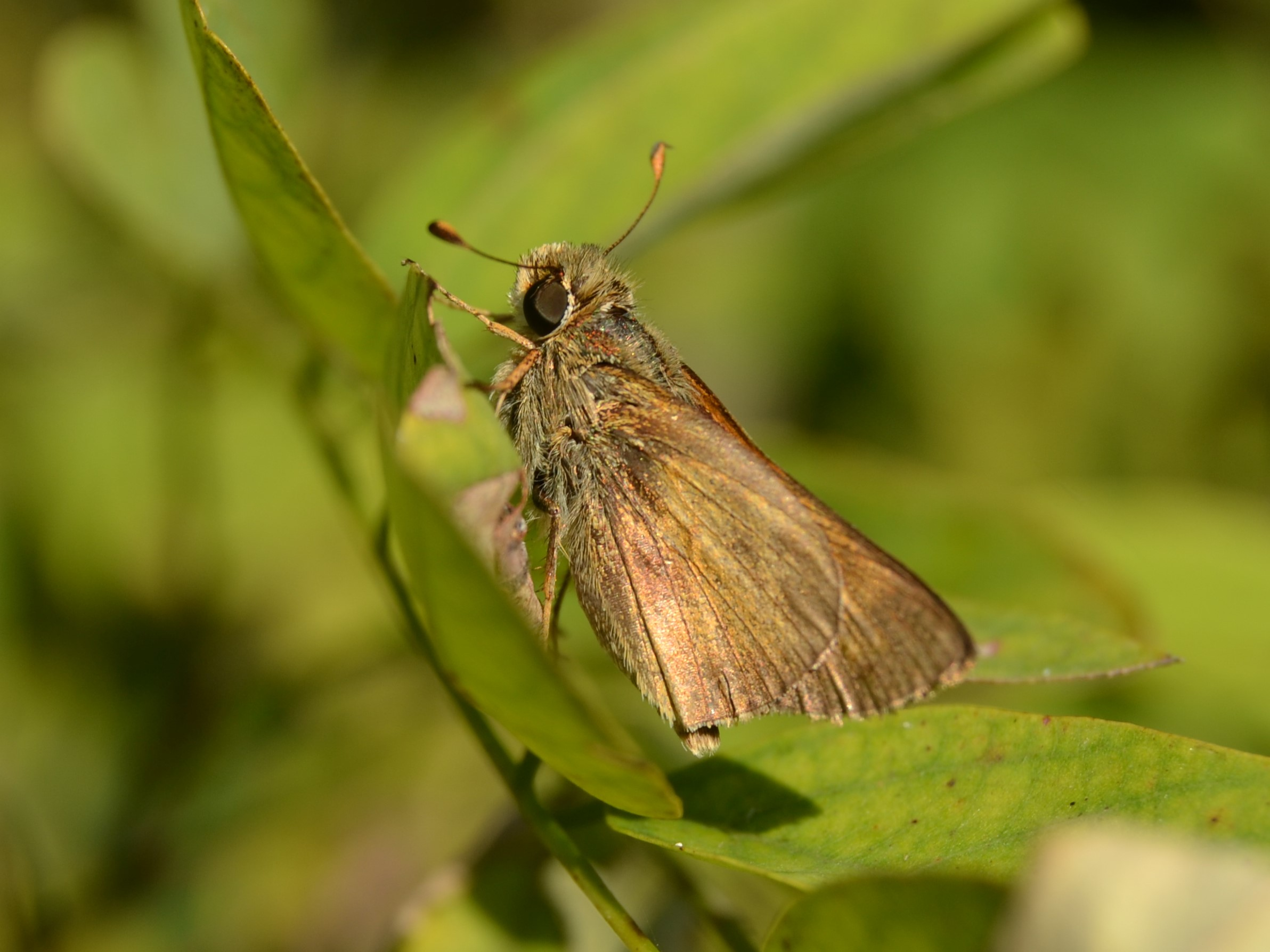

Conservation status
- Secure (NatureServe)

Scientific classification
- Kingdom: Animalia
- Phylum: Arthropoda
- Class: Insecta
- Order: Lepidoptera
- Family: Hesperiidae
- Genus: Nastra
- Species: N. lherminier

Binomial name
- Nastra lherminier (Latreille, 1824)

Synonyms
- Hesperia lherminier Latreille, [1824]; Hesperia fusca Grote and Robinson, 1867

= Nastra lherminier =

Species of butterfly

Nastra lherminier, the swarthy skipper, is a species of grass skipper in the butterfly family Hesperiidae. It is found in Central America and North America.

== Description ==
The upperside of the wing is dark brown. The forewing may have 2 very faint light spots. The underside of the hindwing is yellow-brown with lighter veins. The wing span ranges from 1 to 1.8 inches long or 2.5 to 2.9 centimeters long.
