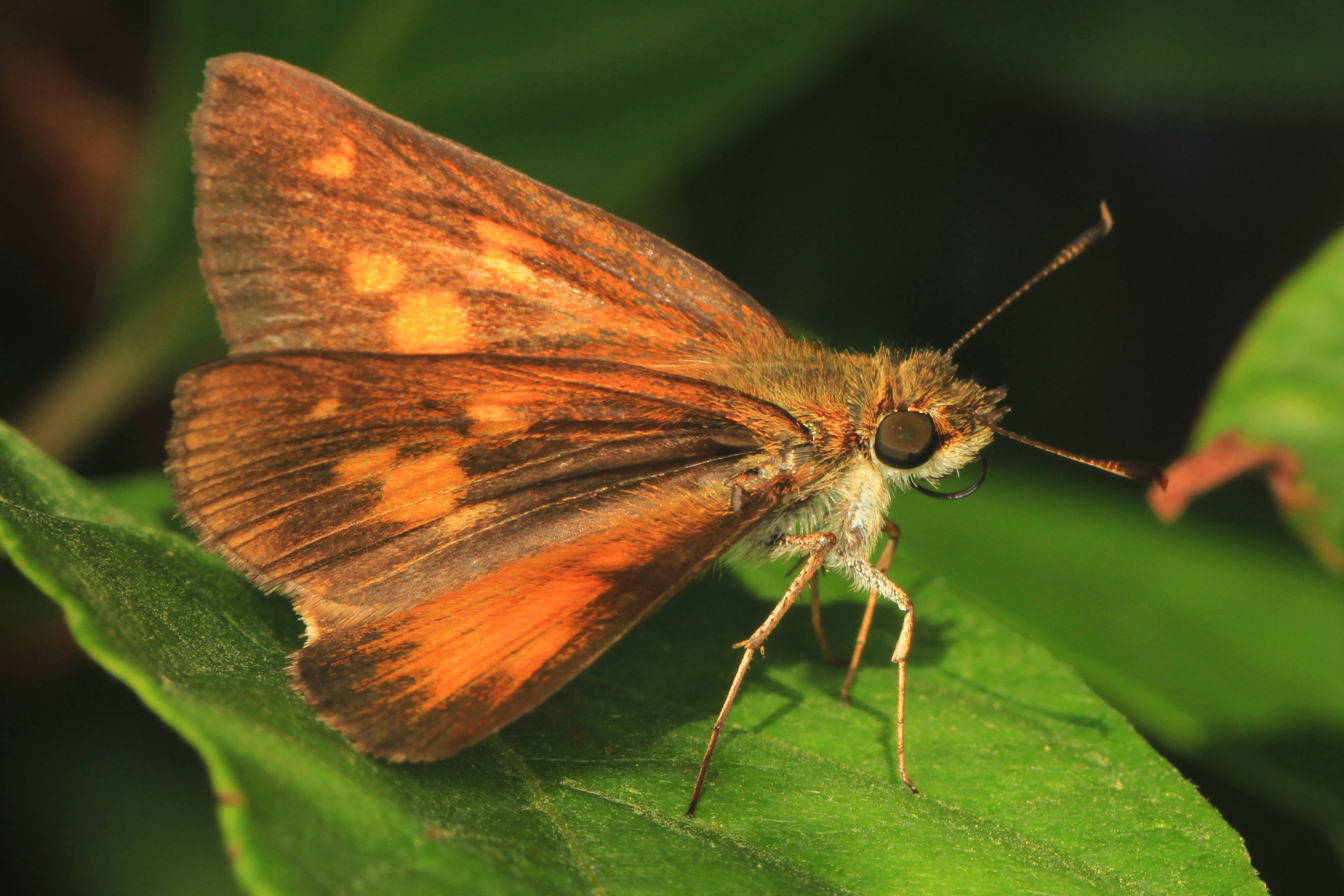
- Broad-winged skipper (Poanes viator)

Scientific classification
- Kingdom: Animalia
- Phylum: Arthropoda
- Class: Insecta
- Order: Lepidoptera
- Family: Hesperiidae
- Subfamily: Hesperiinae
- Tribe: Hesperiini
- Genus: Poanes; Scudder, 1872

Synonyms
- Phycanassa Scudder, 1872

= Poanes =

Genus of butterflies

Poanes is a genus of skipper butterflies (family Hesperiidae) distributed throughout North and Central America. The larvae feed on grasses and sedges. The genus was erected by Samuel Hubbard Scudder in 1872.

== Species ==
In 2019, several species were moved from Poanes to a new genus, Lon. The species remaining in Poanes include:

- Poanes aaroni (Skinner, 1890) – saffron skipper
- Poanes benito Freeman, 1979 – Benito's skipper
- Poanes massasoit (Scudder, 1863) – mulberry wing
- Poanes viator (Edwards, 1865) – broad-winged skipper
- Poanes yehl (Skinner, 1893) – Yehl skipper
- Poanes zachaeus (Plötz, 1883) – Zachaeus skipper

=== Former species ===
- Poanes zabulon (Boisduval and Le Conte, [1837]) - transferred to Lon zabulon (Boisduval and Le Conte, [1837])
- Poanes hobomok (Harris, 1862) - transferred to Lon hobomok (Harris, 1862])
- Poanes inimica (Butler and Druce, 1872) - transferred to Lon inimica (Butler and Druce, 1872])
- Poanes taxiles (Edwards, 1881) - transferred to Lon taxiles (Edwards, 1881])
- Poanes azin (Godman, 1900) - transferred to Lon azin (Godman, 1900])
- Poanes macneilli Burns, 1992 - transferred to Lon macneilli (Burns, 1992)
- Poanes ulphila (Plötz, 1883) - transferred to Lon ulphila (Plötz, 1883])
- Poanes monticola (Godman, [1900]) - transferred to Lon monticola (Godman, 1900)
- Poanes niveolimbus (Mabille, 1889) - transferred to Lon niveolimbus (Mabille, 1889)
- Poanes melane (Edwards, 1869) - transferred to Lon melane (Edwards, 1869])
