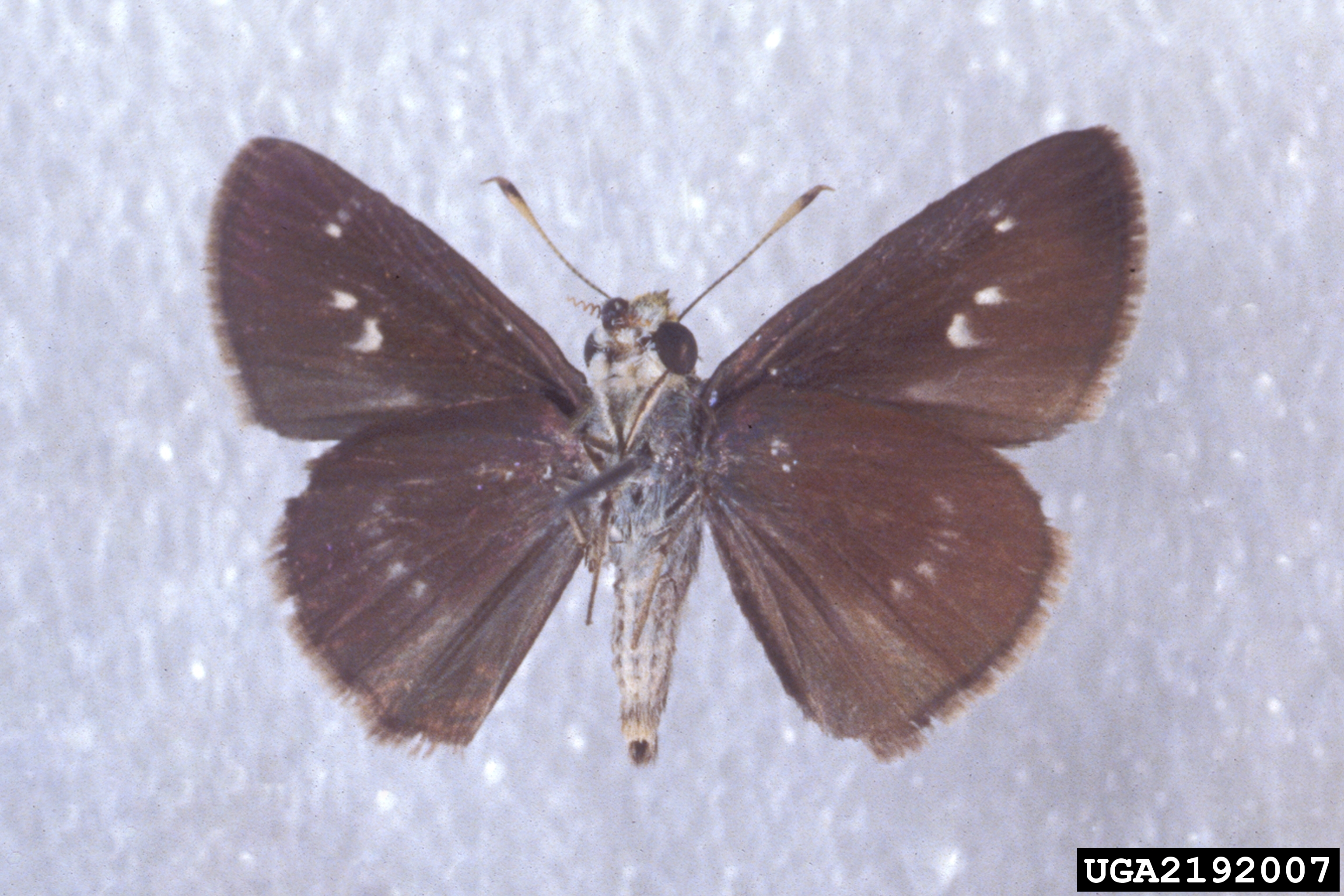
- Euphyes vestris metacomet
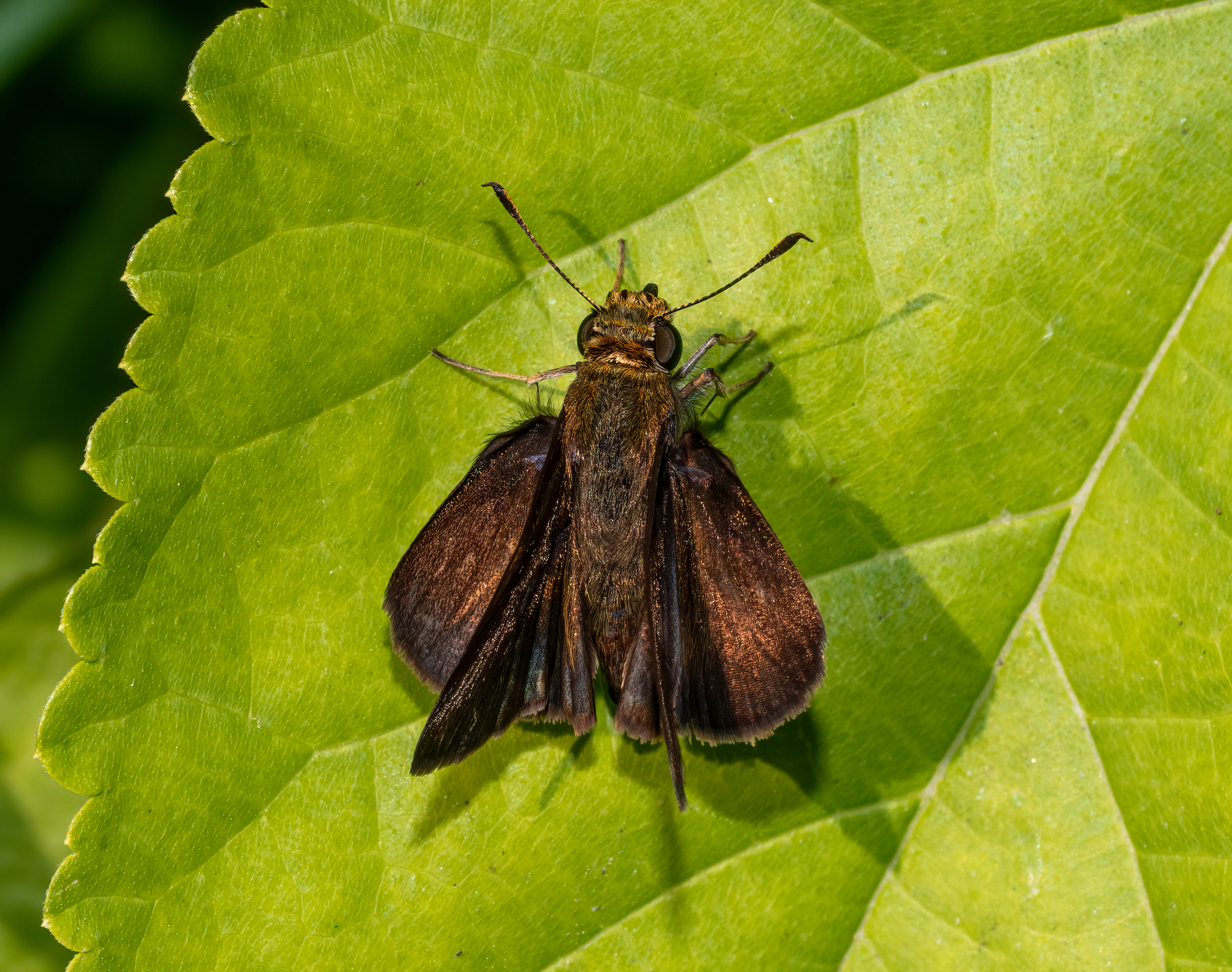

Conservation status
- Secure (NatureServe)

Scientific classification
- Kingdom: Animalia
- Phylum: Arthropoda
- Clade: Pancrustacea
- Class: Insecta
- Order: Lepidoptera
- Family: Hesperiidae
- Genus: Euphyes
- Species: E. vestris

Binomial name
- Euphyes vestris (Boisduval, 1852)

Synonyms
- Hesperia vestris Boisduval, 1852; Hesperia ruricola Boisduval, 1852; Euphyes ruricola; Pamphila osceola Lintner, 1878; Pamphila californica Mabille, 1883; Hesperia metacomet Harris, 1862; Pamphila rurea Edwards, 1862; Hesperia osyka Edwards, 1867; Hesperia baeis Scudder, 1889 (nomen nudum)

= Euphyes vestris =

Species of butterfly

Euphyes vestris, commonly referred to as the dun skipper, is a butterfly belonging to the Hesperiidae family. It appears as a brown, medium-sized butterfly found across the United States and southern Canada. Euphyes vestris inhabits multiple environments, including open fields, oak woodlands, and riparian wetlands. There are currently four recorded subspecies of Euphyes vestris, three of which have been identified across eatern, western, and mountainous regions of North America. These subspecies are E. v. metacomet, E. v. vestris, and E. v. kiowah. The fourth subspecies, Euphyes vestris harbisoni, known as the Harbison's dun skipper is geographically restricted to southern California and northern Mexico.

The dun skipper, Euphyes vestris, is categorized within the genus Euphyes, a known group of ten closely related skippers found in North America. Species belonging to this genus live in environments with high humidity, such as swampy habitats, and occur in small populations. Across its subspecies it has been recognized that E. vestris relies on sedges, which are plants in the family Cyperaceae, as host plants for its larval development.

== Taxonomy ==
Euphyes vestris belongs to the order Lepidoptera and the family Hesperiidae. The genus Euphyes includes ten identified species located within North America. Species in this genus are categorized as habitat specialists, which means they are found in specific environments where certain conditions are met. Many Euphyes species live in moist or swampy habitats and occur in isolated populations.

Euphyes vestris was first identified by Boisduval in 1852 and is commonly found throughout North America.

== Subspecies ==
- Euphyes vestris vestris (California)
- Euphyes vestris metacomet (Harris, 1862) (from Alberta east through the southern parts of Saskatchewan, Manitoba, Ontario, Quebec and New Brunswick, southeast through Montana, South Dakota, Kansas, Missouri, Arkansas, Mississippi and Louisiana, and eastward to the Atlantic coast)
- Euphyes vestris kiowah (Reakirt, 1866)
- Euphyes vestris harbisoni Brown & McGuire, 1983 (California)

== Physical description ==
=== Adults ===
Adult E. vestris are physically characterized as medium-sized skippers. They often have a wingspan of 25-35 mm, with the largest subspecies, E. v. harbisoni, known to have an average wingspan of 30-35 mm. Male and female adults are additionally characterized by their brown appearance, with golden hairs on their heads.

It is possible to differentiate the sexes of this species by their wing patterns. Males have a distinctive black stigma on their forewings, with additional orange bordering. Females do not have a black stigma, but instead show two light spots on their forewings, as well as a faint band on their hindwings.

=== Eggs ===
The eggs of E. vestris are observed as pale green and dome-shaped when initially laid. As they mature, fertilized eggs develop red spots on the top, in addition to a red band around the center of the egg. Females have been described as laying eggs one at a time on the middle section of their host plant leaves.

=== Larval description ===
Detailed accounts of the larval description were provided by Heitzman in 1964 in the article "The Early Stages of Euphyes vestris" published in the Journal of Research on the Lepidoptera.

First instar: Once hatched, the larva consumes the majority of its eggshell. The body of the newly hatched larva is yellow, with multiple segments appearing paler. The body is also covered with white hairs, with the last segment notably containing more hairs. The head of the larva is brown with black mandibles.

Second instar: After the first shedding of the outer skin, the larva has a pale green body with faint white coloring. It also has black bristles located along the body. The prothoracic shield is described as "jet black", and there is a visible black dot near the first spiracle. In contrast to the first instar, the head is pale orange with dark brown mandibles and brown spots.

Third instar: The next molt in the larva's life cycle allows it to present a watery green color. The last abdominal segment is grayish green and surrounded by white hairs. The prothorax is visibly white and contains a shiny black prothoracic shield. The head of the larva is pale orange/brown with notable cream-colored vertical stripes. Additionally, there is a dark brown oval spot near the face. The head is surrounded by yellow bristles.

Fourth instar: The larva is bright green with many horizontal marks across the body. The prothoracic shield is predominantly white near the top, with thin black lines along the sides. The first spiracle contains a large black dot while other spiracles do not contain any visible dots. The head is described as caramel brown with a cream band running across the outer edge. Additionally, there is a black oval spot located in the center of the face.

Final instar: The larva is pale transparent green with a white appearance attributed to the many white marks present on the body. Each spiracle contains a black dot, with a larger dot present on the first spiracle. The back of the head is visibly black, while the remaining portions are brown. There is a velvety black oval spot present near the upper center of the face. The jaws of the larvae are dark brown and black.

=== Pupa ===
The pupae of E. vestris are visibly pale, with green undertones on the abdomen, while the wing case, and thorax appear yellow-green. The spiracles of the pupa are dark brown. Additionally, the head contains red bristles. During pupation, the pupa position is positioned upright with a short silk structure extending 10 mm in front of it.

== Geographical distribution ==
E. vestris is known to have a large geographical distribution, as it can be found across the United States and southern Canada. However, although the species as a whole is broadly distributed across North America, specific subspecies are restricted to specialized regions.

Specifically, the subspecies Euphyes vestris harbisoni is very restricted and is found only in southern California and northern Mexico. Within California, it is most commonly found in San Diego County, in addition to western regions of Riverside County. Recent surveys examining the geographic distribution of this subspecies have shown a decline in its geographical distribution. At the time these surveys were conducted, from 2013 to 2018, there were 39 known sites where these butterflies had previously been recorded. Of the 39 known locations, 33 were publicly accessible, while the other six were located in restricted private areas. Among the accessible sites, 22 still supported the population, while 10 sites were found to no longer support the population. The remaining eight sites were classified as unknown because they were located on private property. These surveys show that the geographic distribution of the subspecies is concentrated within San Diego, Orange, and Riverside counties. Additionally, these surveys found many of the host plants in other parts of San Diego, but the dun skippers were not identified. This is important because it shows that although the presence of the host plant was confirmed, the host plant alone is not enough to support the geographic distribution of the species. Other environmental factors such as moisture, shade, and vegetation can also contribute to whether the populations can survive in a location.

== Habitat ==
=== Habitat of broader species ===
Most subspecies of E. vestris have been noted to live across North America in fields, waste areas, and habitats where sedge plants are present. The species has also been known to be attracted to flowers in the genus Mentha, Apocynum, and Asclepias.

=== Habitat of E. v. harbisoni ===
The habitat of the harbisoni subspecies has been more thoroughly researched compared to other subspecies, and it has been found that this subspecies is a habitat specialist. Specifically, the habitat of the harbisoni subspecies has been associated with riparian oak woodlands within San Diego County. This subspecies relies heavily on the presence of San Diego sedge, Carex spissa, because it serves as the larval host plant.The sedge can be found to grow along creek beds and drainage areas beneath shaded oak trees within riparian oak woodlands. Additionally, surveys have shown that San Diego sedge is associated with riparian oak woodlands, which explains why this subspecies is found near this environment as its primary habitat.

Additionally, it has been found that San Diego sedge is located near flowing water, which means that E. v. harbisoni will also often be found there. In addition to its host plant, environmental conditions also help explain the habitat preferences of harbisoni. Based on GIS habitat analysis, three critical factors were found to influence habitat preference: maximum temperature in June, actual evapotranspiration in July, and elevation. When these conditions become too harsh, the population of the species declines. This means that E. v. harbisoni prefers habitats where these three factors are at optimal levels for its survival.

== Life cycle ==
=== Egg ===
The life cycle of E. vestris starts with the egg stage, in which the adult female lays eggs one at a time on the host plant. The eggs are described as pale yellow. For the subspecies E. v. harbisoni, the eggs are known to be laid on San Diego sedge leaves. For the subspecies E. v. metacomet, females place eggs on host plants such as Carex heliophilia, in addition to other sedge species.

=== Larvae ===
Once the eggs have hatched, the larvae immediately start consuming their host plant to obtain energy for growth and development. As the larvae continue to eat and grow, they gradually develop through successive instars, eventually building a protective shelter called a hibernaculum. The foundation of these shelters is their host plant leaves in addition to silk. This shelter serves as a safe space for the larvae, which is used when they are not feeding. The first four instars of the species last around seven days each, whereas the final instar lasts 12 days.

=== Pupae ===
Pupation of E. vestris occurs within the shelter that the larvae build earlier in development, called a hibernaculum. Before pupation, however, the upper part of the shelter is closed off, and the pupal stage takes 18–21 days.

=== Adults ===
The adults of E. vestris commonly emerge during spring and summer. In the subspecies E. v. harbisoni, "adult flight season is known to last from May 15 to July 16". The adults are known to be active during the warmer parts of the day. Their activity is correlated with temperature, which also influences how likely they are to fly. During the adult stage, females reproduce by laying eggs one at a time on the leaves of their host plants, allowing the life cycle to restart.

== Host plants ==
The host plants of members of the E. vestris species are sedges in the plant plant family, Cyperaceae. However, the specific species of sedge plant is dependent on the subspecies and region. For the eastern subspecies, E. v metacomet, it was discovered that larvae are able to successfully develop on yellow nutsedge, Cyperus esculentus. This specific plant species is found in damp areas located near roadsides. Additionally, for the subspecies E. v. harbisoni, the larval host is located in San Diego and is called San Diego sedge, Carvex spissa, most commonly found in riparian oak woodlands. The host plants are very sensitive to climate events, in which events such as drought can make them unusable and uninhabitable for larval development. This is important for conservation because protecting this species requires not only protecting the larvae, but also protecting the host plants used to lay eggs.

== Mating and reproduction ==
Studies have examined the reproduction of E. vestris by looking at spermatophores in females. Spermatophores are structures that are transferred by males during mating. Specifically, in butterflies, a successful mating results in the female having a spermatophore within her reproductive tract.

In the publication Mating Frequency in Natural population of Skippers and Butterflies as Determined by Spermatophore Counts, it was found that the average spermatophore count within a mated female was 1.45. This result shows that E. vestris has an intermediate mating pattern, meaning that it falls between the two extremes of only mating only once or mating multiple times. It was also noted in the article that mating frequency may be related to population density, with females in denser populations mating less often and females in less dense populations mating more often.

Additionally, reproduction is also dependent on the survival of the host plant because females lay eggs on plants such as San Diego sedge for E. v. harbisoni. Therefore, reproduction depends on whether the host plant is healthy.

== Threats ==
The population of Euphyes vestris has been declining, and this decline has been attributed to multiple factors.

=== Drought and climate change ===
Drought and climate change have been identified as major contributors to the population decline of Euphyes vestris harbisoni. In Southern California, this subspecies has experienced increasingly severe droughts over extended periods of time, with San Diego County recording especially low precipitation between 2013 and 2015. This prolonged drought negatively impacts the subspecies by reducing the availability of its host plant, San Diego sedge. Long periods of drought cause sedge plants to undergo severe stress and reduced growth. When this stress becomes extreme, the sedge plants may die completely, even after rainfall returns in the winter. Surveys conducted in drought exposed areas found that both larvae and adult skippers were absent when sedge plants experienced drought stress. Consequently, these stressors are associated with smaller adult populations and shorter flight seasons.

=== Wildfire ===
Another recognized threat to Euphyes vestris is wildfire. Wildfires can directly harm populations by reducing their habitat and damaging the ecosystem they rely on. Fires can kill eggs, larvae, pupae, and adults if they are within the affected habitat. Additionally, wildfires can affect subspecies populations by destroying the oak canopy shade that protects San Diego sedge, a larval host plant. Without the shade provided by these oak trees, sedge plants are exposed to direct sunlight, which makes the habitat less suitable for the species. One example of population loss after wildfire exposure is the population at Sycamore Canyon Ecological Reserve, which was last observed in 1999 and later labeled extinct after the 2003 Cedar Fire. This example shows that wildfires can permanently eliminate local populations.

=== Species interactions ===
The invasive goldspotted oak borer, Agrilus auroguttatus, is an indirect threat to Euphyes vestris because it damages and kills oak trees. Specifically, the goldspotted oak borer attacks and kills coast live oak (Quercus agrifolia), California black oak (Quercus kelloggii), and canyon live oak (Quercus chrysolepis). Although these beetles do not directly interact with Euphyes vestris, they affect the oak trees that its host plants depend on for protection. Oak trees are important for the survival of this subspecies because they reduce sunlight exposure, protecting host plants from drying out or becoming unsuitable for larvae. The goldspotted oak borer was found at 35% of surveyed sites containing Euphyes vestris, making it a prominent indirect threat to the species. This threat is expected to worsen with climate change because reduced shade from oak trees can further decrease moisture and make the habitat drier.

== Conservation strategies ==
Specific strategies have been developed by the San Diego County Harbison's Dun Skipper Habitat Conservation and Management Plan. This plan is a long-term conservation outline with the goal of ensuring that the subspecies is able to survive for the next 100 years.

=== Protection from wildfire ===
The first goal to conserve this subspecies is to protect it from wildfires. To achieve this goal, the county plans suggests to implement pre-fire management, including fuel reduction and fire risk planning for sites currently inhabited by Euphyes vestris harbisoni. When fires do occur, the county suggests to help San Diego sedge survive while the oak canopy regrows. To help the sedge survive, it is advised to provide extra water and temporary shade. Additionally, temporary fencing to protect larvae and host plants is also recommended.

=== Habitat protection ===
Riparian oak woodlands inhabited by Euphyes vestris harbisoni will be protected within this plan when possible. These woodlands are crucial because they provide shade and moisture for San Diego sedge, which the skipper depends on for survival. It is also recommended that land managers avoid clearing plants from the understory, which refers to the vegetation growing under the oak trees. These understory areas are important because the skipper uses the sedge plants found there throughout its life cycle. The goal of this conservation effort is to protect the entire oak woodland, not just the sedge patches that are visible. This is because an area that might now show visible sedge one year can still become important habitat later if it becomes suitable for sedge growth.

== Phylogeny ==
Euphyes vestris is part of the genus Euphyes, a group of skipper butterflies in the family Hesperiidae. In this genus, Euphyes vestris belongs to the vestris group, which also includes Euphyes chamuli, Euphyes bimacula, and Euyphyes arpa. These species are within the same group because they share similar physical traits and reproductive structures. The vestris group is separate from other insects in the genus as they possess flexible lateral spines on the male aedeagus and blunt-tipped uncus prongs. The group E. vestris is most closely related to E. chamuli due to lots of similarities between male and female reproductive structures. However, there are distinctive differences between the penei, subferruginea, and dion groups due to distinct morphological differences. These differences point towards the fact that the four groups evolved from a common ancestor but became more distinct lineages over time.
