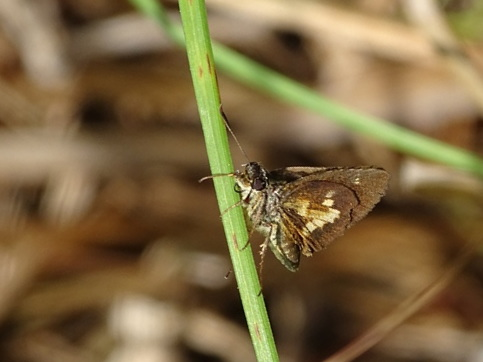

Conservation status
- Apparently Secure (NatureServe)

Scientific classification
- Kingdom: Animalia
- Phylum: Arthropoda
- Clade: Pancrustacea
- Class: Insecta
- Order: Lepidoptera
- Family: Hesperiidae
- Genus: Poanes
- Species: P. massasoit

Binomial name
- Poanes massasoit (Scudder, 1864)

Subspecies
- P. m. chermocki Andersen & Simmons, 1976; P. m. hughi Clark, 1931

Synonyms
- Hesperia massasoit Scudder, 1863; Hesperia suffusa (Laurent, 1892)

= Poanes massasoit =

Species of butterfly

Poanes massasoit, the mulberry wing, is a skipper butterfly found in North America.

== Distribution ==
It is found on the East Coast of the United States, in a few states south and southwest of the Great Lakes, and in southern Ontario and Quebec.

Its wingspan is 22–29 mm.

== Behavior and ecology ==
=== Larval host plants ===
Larvae feed on tussock sedge (Carex stricta) and possibly C. aquatilis, Poaceae, and other Cyperaceae sp.

=== Adult food plants ===
Adult mulberry wings feed on swamp milkweed, common milkweed, buttonbush, narrowleaf mountainmint, pickerelweed, common self-heal, and tufted vetch. They appear to have a preference for pink, purple, and white flowers.

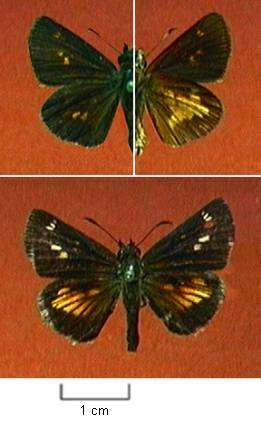
Male and female specimens
