= Agrilus coxalis =

Scientific classification
- Kingdom: Animalia
- Phylum: Arthropoda
- Clade: Pancrustacea
- Class: Insecta
- Order: Coleoptera
- Suborder: Polyphaga
- Infraorder: Elateriformia
- Family: Buprestidae
- Genus: Agrilus
- Species: A. coxalis

Binomial name
- Agrilus coxalis Waterhouse, 1889

Synonyms
- Agrilus socus

Species of beetle

Agrilus coxalis is a species of jewel beetle from Guatemala and Mexico, formerly confused with a very similar species from Arizona, Agrilus auroguttatus, which is a significant pest.
