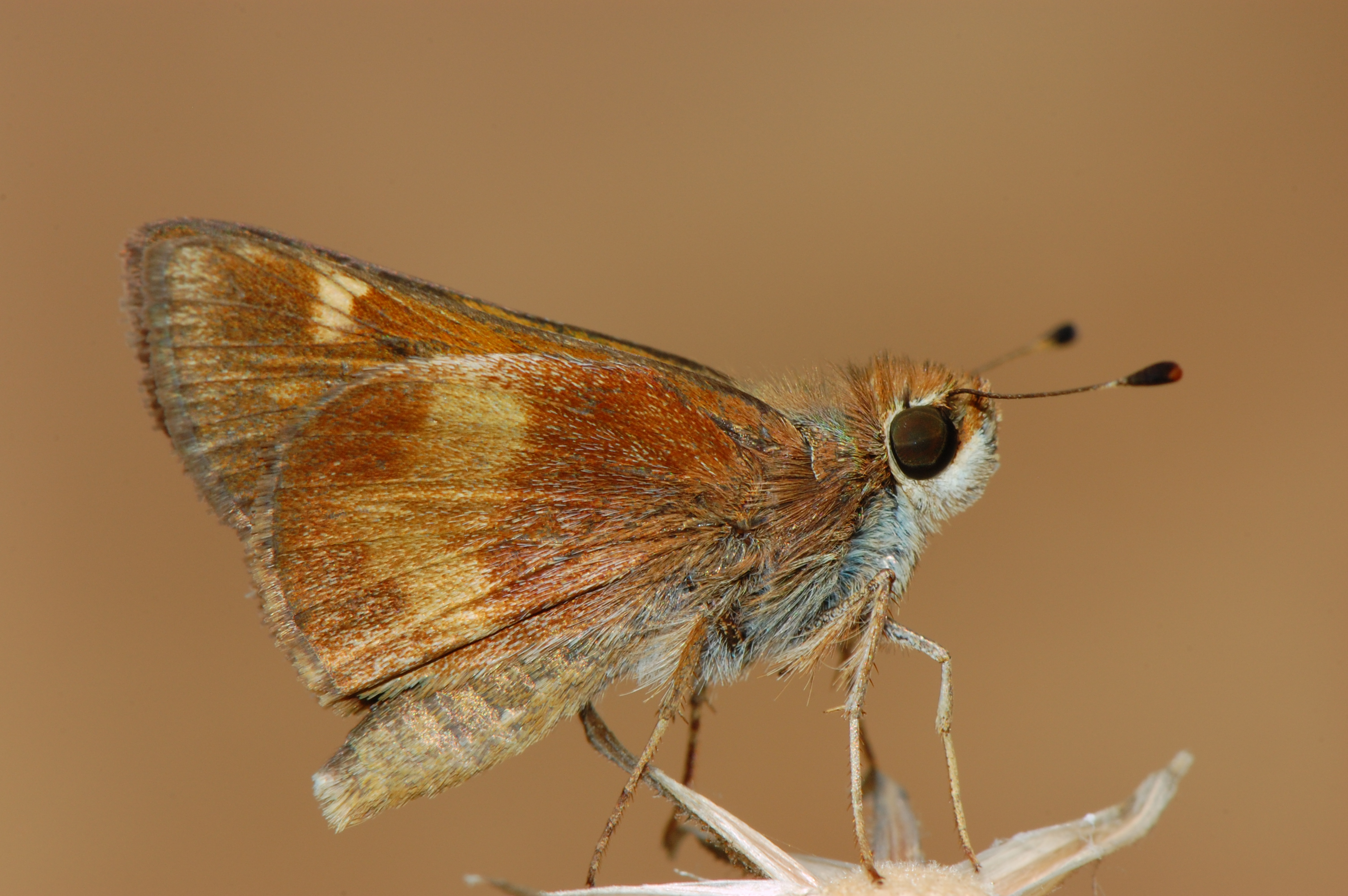

Conservation status
- Secure (NatureServe)

Scientific classification
- Kingdom: Animalia
- Phylum: Arthropoda
- Clade: Pancrustacea
- Class: Insecta
- Order: Lepidoptera
- Family: Hesperiidae
- Genus: Lon
- Species: L. melane

Binomial name
- Lon melane (Edwards, 1869)

Synonyms
- Hesperia melane Edwards, 1869; Poanes melane (Edwards, 1869); Pamphila marmorosa Godman, 1900; Paratrytone melane poa Evans, 1955; Paratrytone vitellina Herrich-Schäffer, 1869

= Lon melane =

Species of butterfly

Lon melane, also known as the umber skipper, is a butterfly of the family Hesperiidae. It is found in California (west of the Sierra Nevada divide), southern Arizona, Baja California, the highlands of Mexico and Central America.

== Description ==
Uppersides of wings are umber or red-brown, the forewing with a row of lighter spots and the hindwing with some orange. Underside of wings is brown with some spotting. The wingspan is 32–35 millimetres (1.3–1.4 in).

== Habitat and behavior ==
The habitat consists of desert foothills, grassy areas, streamsides, roadsides, yards, parks and open oak woodland. There are two generations per year with adults on wing from March to May and again from September to October. Adults feed on flower nectar.

The larvae feed on the leaves of various grasses, including Cynodon dactylon, Deschampsia caespitosa, Lamarckia aurea, Stenotaphrum secundatum, Carex spissa, Phyllostachys bambusoides, Ehrharta erecta, Lolium multiflorum, Paspalum dilatatum, Pennisetum clandestinum, Sorghum sudanense, Digitaria sanguinalis, Bromus carinatus, Dactylis glomerata, Agrostis palustris, Festuca myuros, Festuca rubra, Agropyron cristatum and Poa pratensis. They live in shelters made of rolled or tied leaves.

== Subspecies ==
- Lon melane melane (California)
- Lon melane poa (Evans, 1955) (Costa Rica)
- Lon melane vitellina (Herrich-Schäffer, 1869) (Mexico)
