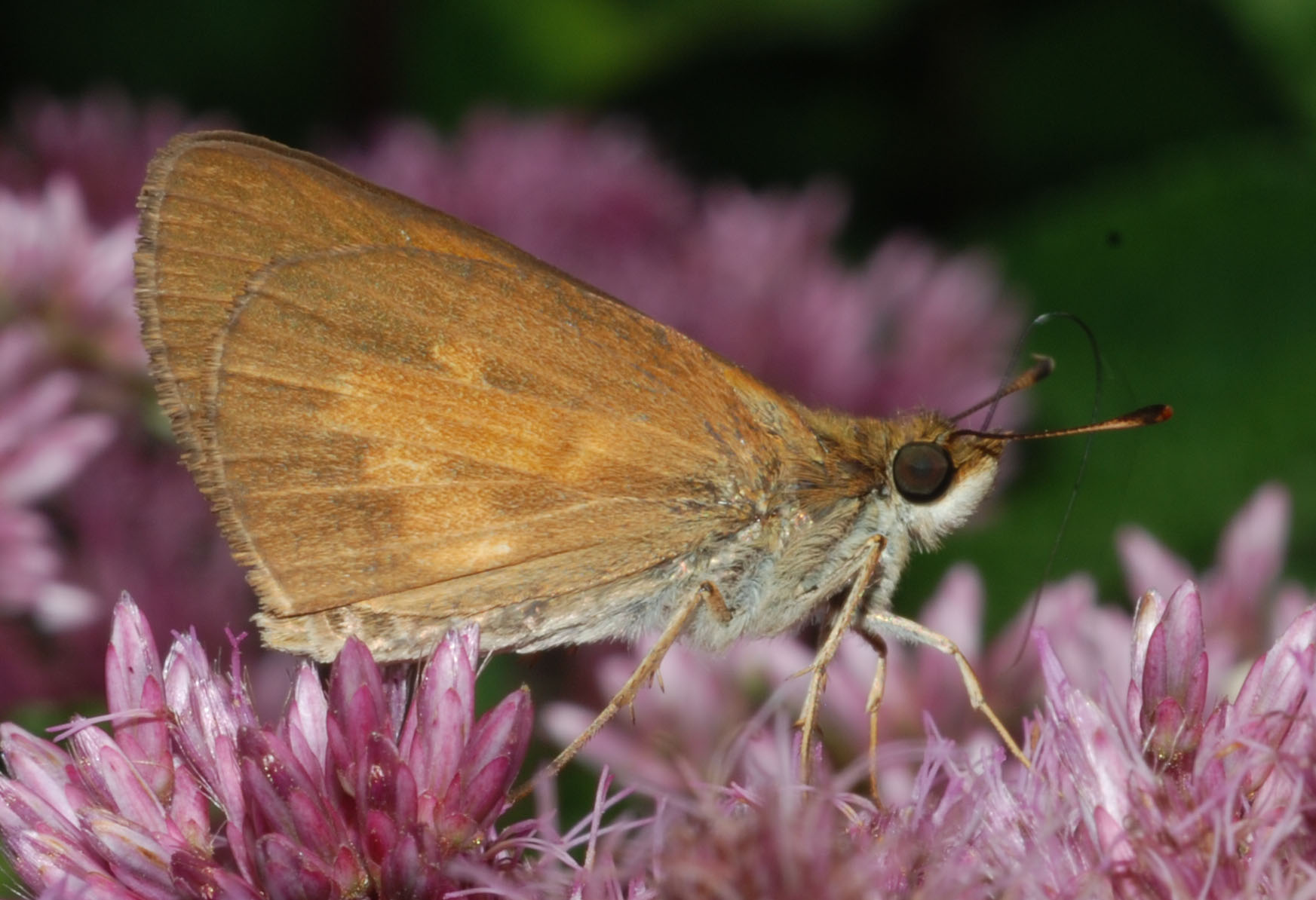

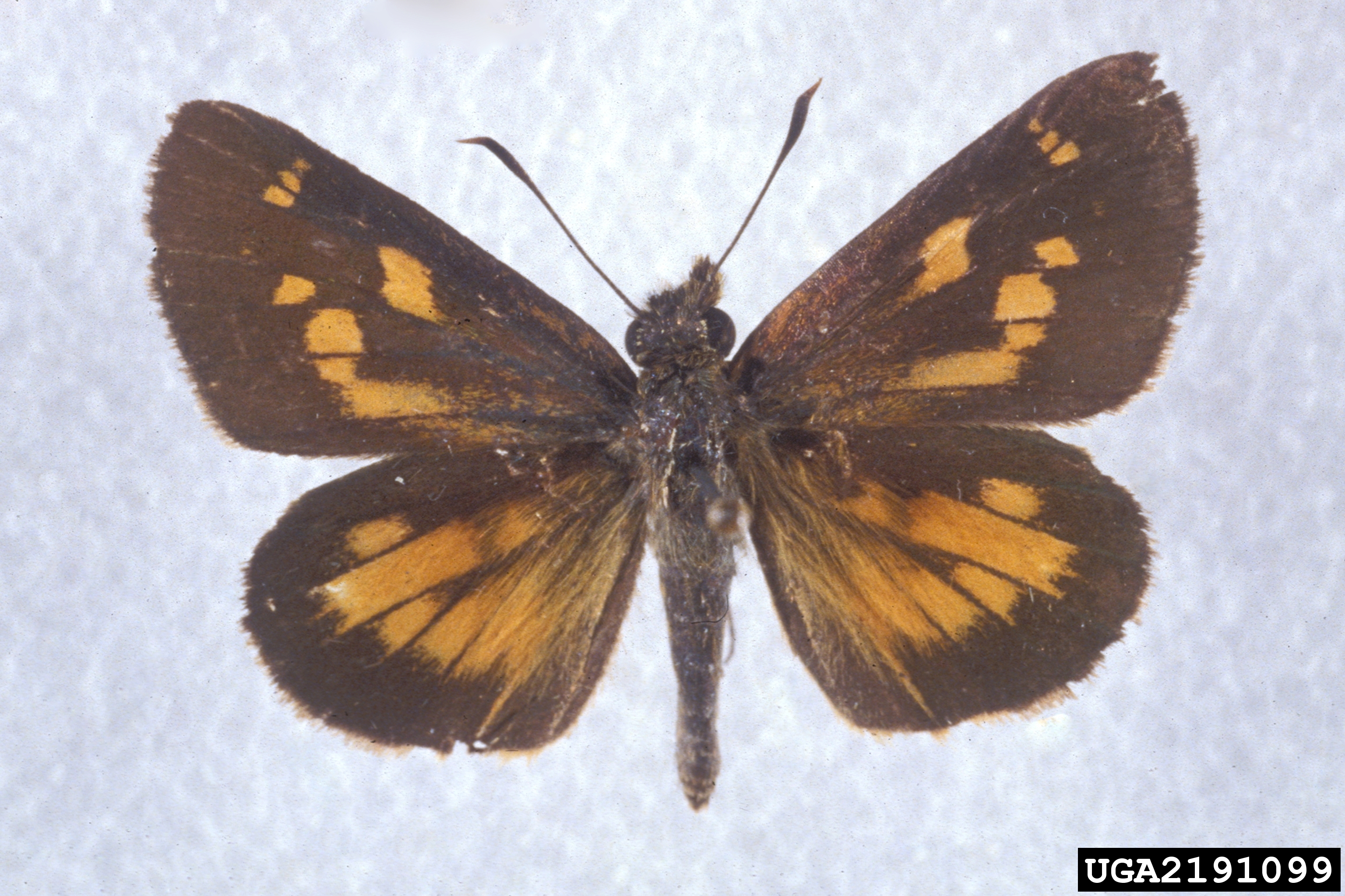

Conservation status
- Secure (NatureServe)

Scientific classification
- Kingdom: Animalia
- Phylum: Arthropoda
- Class: Insecta
- Order: Lepidoptera
- Family: Hesperiidae
- Genus: Poanes
- Species: P. viator

Binomial name
- Poanes viator (W.H. Edwards, 1865)

Subspecies
- P. v. viator; P. v. zizaniae

= Poanes viator =

Species of butterfly

Poanes viator, the broad-winged skipper, is a skipper butterfly found in North America.

== Distribution ==
It ranges from Texas to Florida and along the east coast to Massachusetts and west to southern Quebec and Ontario to the Dakotas.

== Host plants ==
Larvae feed on Carex sp. and Phragmites australis.
