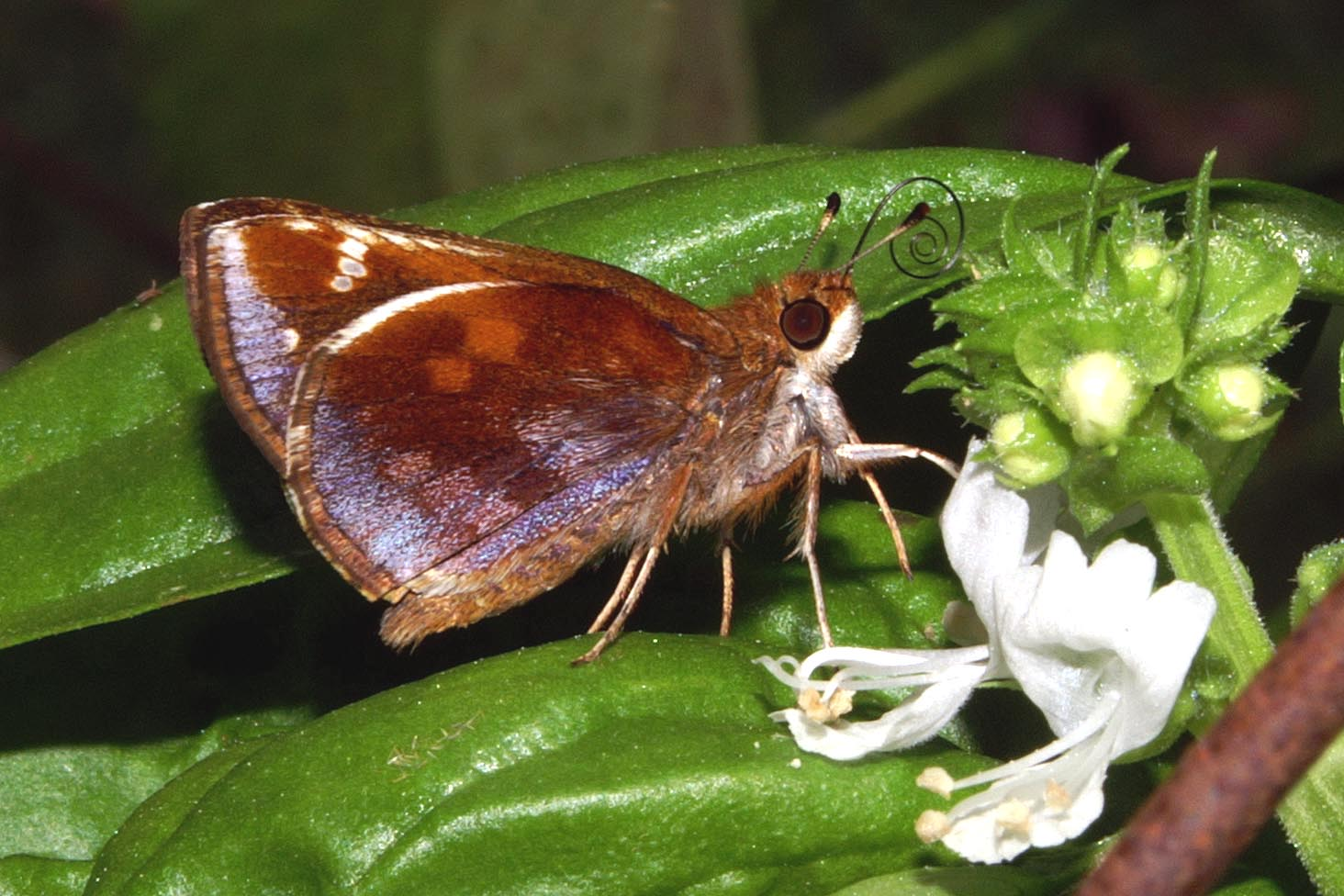
- Female
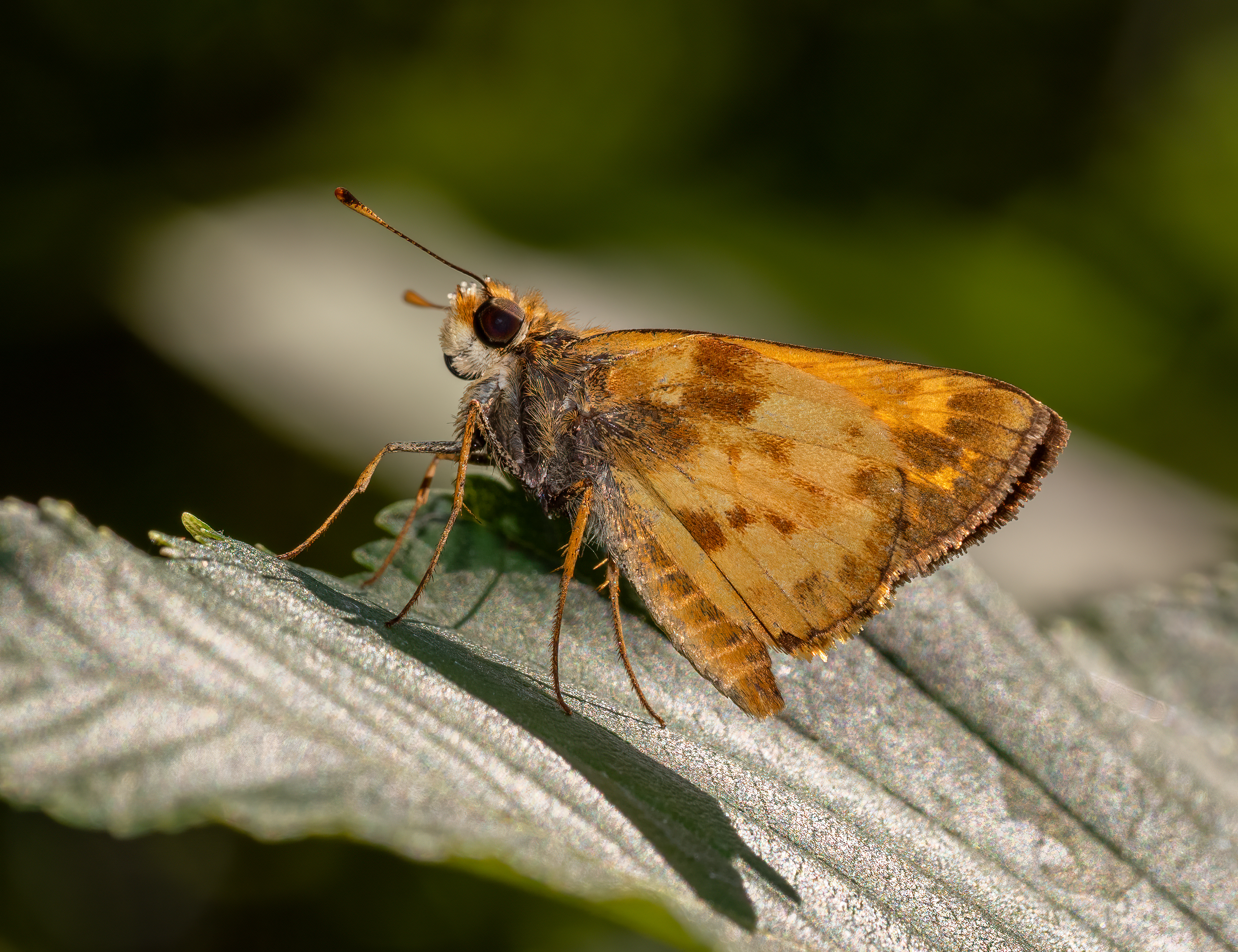
- Male

Conservation status
- Secure (NatureServe)

Scientific classification
- Kingdom: Animalia
- Phylum: Arthropoda
- Clade: Pancrustacea
- Class: Insecta
- Order: Lepidoptera
- Family: Hesperiidae
- Genus: Lon
- Species: L. zabulon

Binomial name
- Lon zabulon (Boisduval & LeConte, 1837)

Synonyms
- Hesperia zabulon; Pamphila zabulon; Atrytone zabulon; Atrytone cabulon; Poanes zabulon

= Zabulon skipper =

Species of butterfly

The Zabulon skipper (Lon zabulon) (sometimes called the southern dimorphic skipper) is a North American butterfly first described by the French naturalists Jean Baptiste Boisduval and John Eatton Le Conte from the state of Georgia, United States.

== Description ==
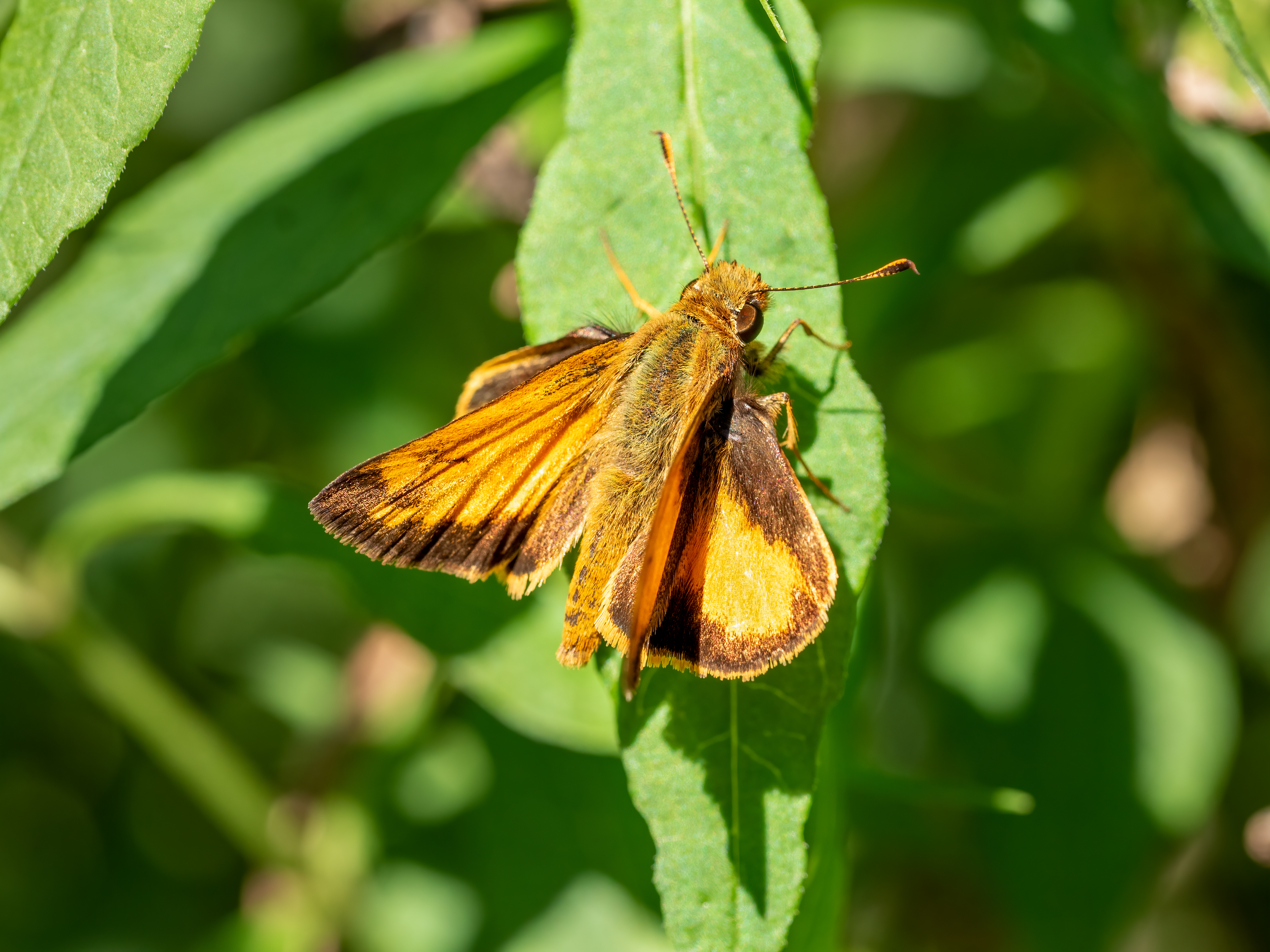
Upperside of the male

This small butterfly has slim, triangular wings. The upperside of the male's wings is mostly orange with the margins being dark brown. The underside of the male's wings is mainly yellow orange with the margins being dark brown. There is a yellow basal spot enclosed with brown. The upperside of the female's wings is dark brown with large, glassy spots near the forewing outer margin. The underside of the female's wings is a brownish-burgundy color with the hindwing having a white streak on the costal edge. The wing margins are broadly frosted. The wingspan measures 1 3/8 to 1 5/8 inches (35–41 mm).

== Similar species ==
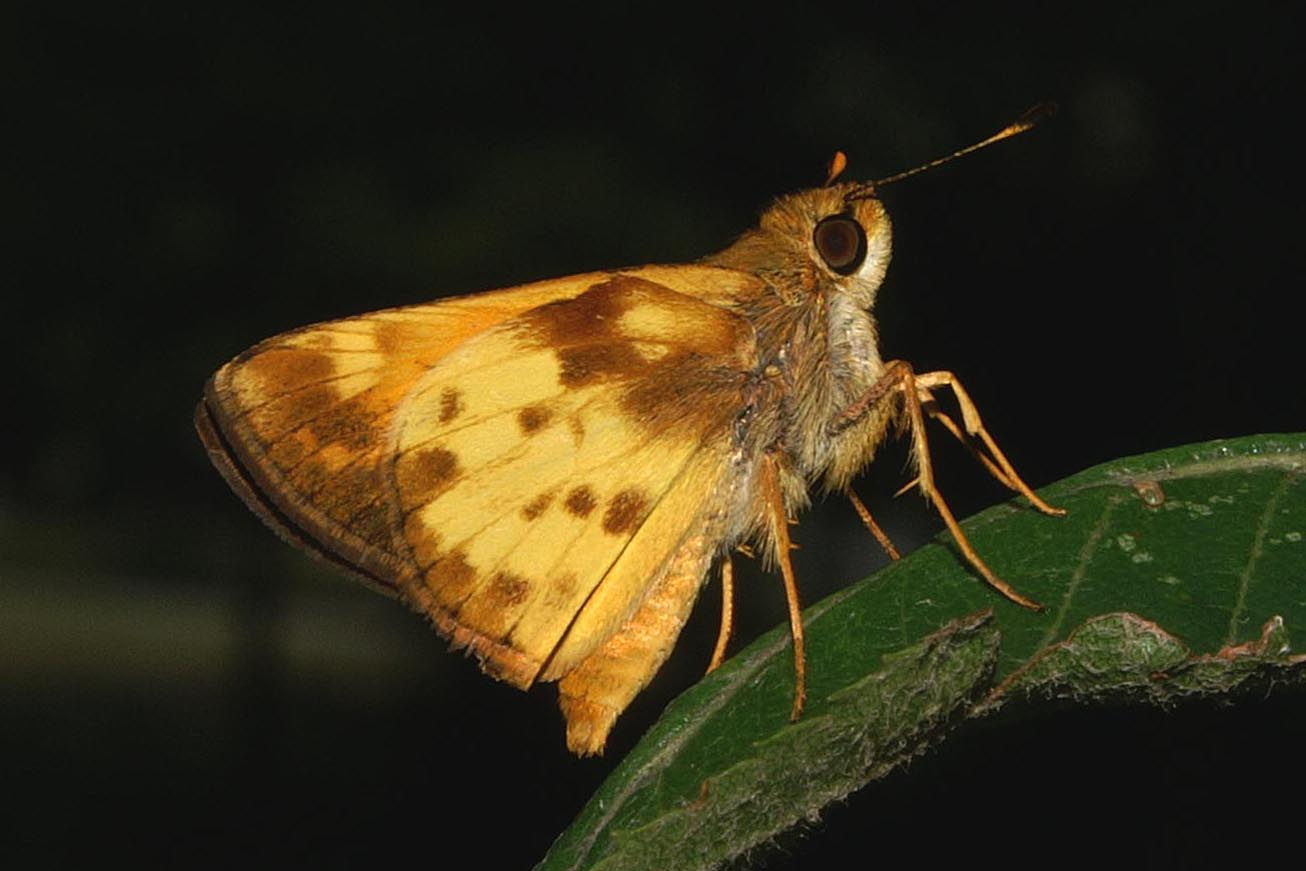
Underside of the male

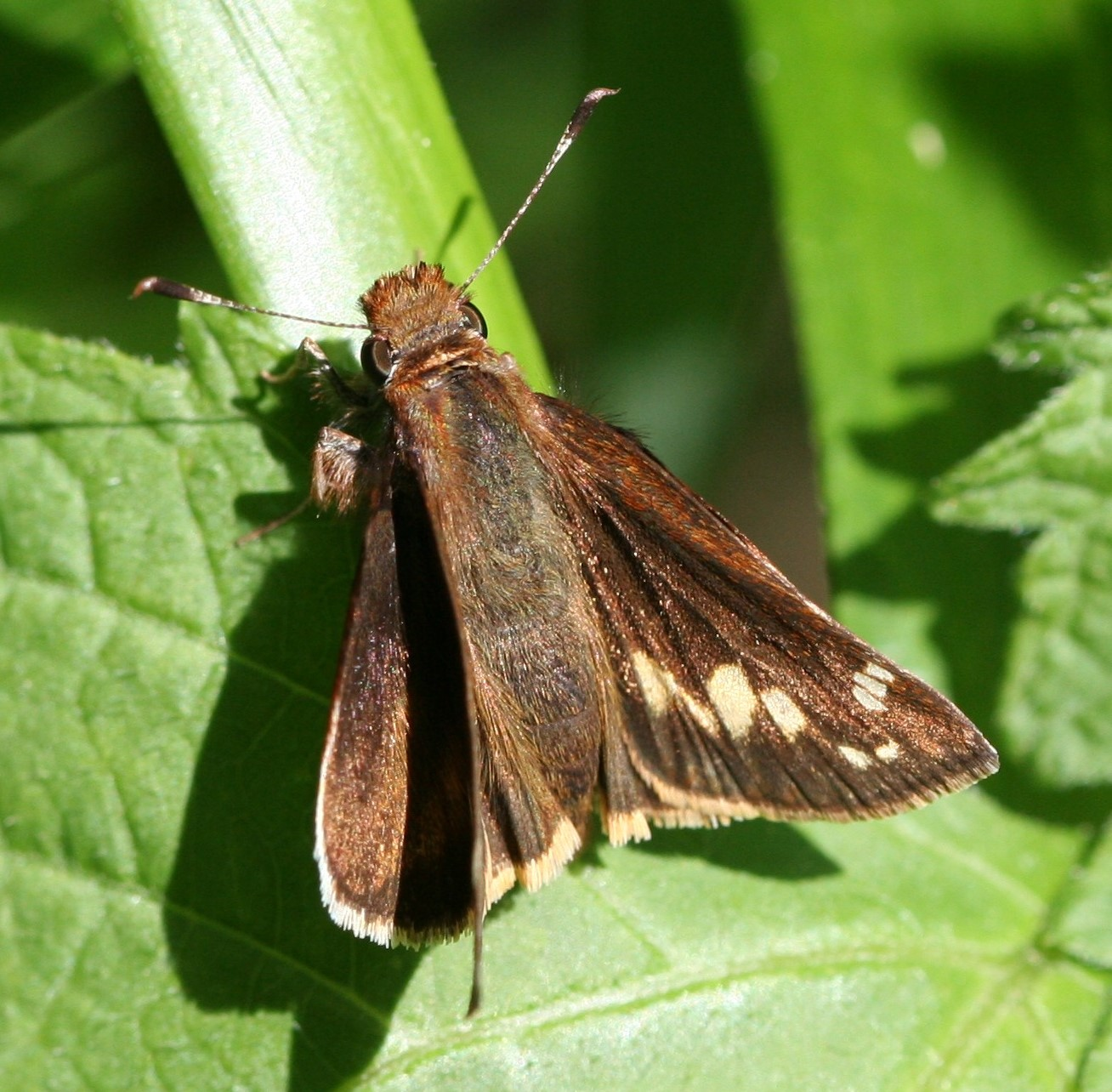
Upperside of the female

The only similar species in the Zabulon skipper's range is the Hobomok skipper.

The Hobomok skipper has a more northern range and different flight period than the Zabulon skipper. They also have more rounded wings. The upperside of the male Hobomok skipper's wings has thicker dark margins. The underside of the male's hindwing lacks the enclosed yellow basal spot. While the female Zabulon skipper has one form, the female Hobomok skipper has two; the normal form and the pocahontas form. The upperside of the pocahontas form has smaller glassy spots and has one glassy spot near the forewing costa.

== Distribution ==
This species ranges from Wisconsin east to the East Coast, south to Georgia, Texas, and Panama.

== Habitat ==
The Zabulon skipper can be found in a wide range of habitats such as woodland edges, woodland openings, and near roads, especially if there are streams nearby. It can adapt to other habitats including suburban areas, parks, and gardens.

== Flight ==
This butterfly is on the wing from March to April and again in August to October in the south; and from May to July and again in August to September in the north.

== Life cycle ==
Males perch all day in search for females. Usually, courtship takes place in the afternoon. However, it will occasionally happen as early as 8:20 a.m. Females lay their eggs singly on the underside of host plant leaves. The larva is either brown or green, both sometimes having a pinkish hue. It is often indistinguishable from closely related larvae. The chrysalis is often formed inside a leaf shelter. It is brown with the abdomen being a lighter brown and having small black dots. The overwintering stage is unknown. The Zabulon skipper has two broods per year.

== Host plants ==
Recorded food plants of the caterpillars are grasses such as Agrostis, Dactylis, Elymus (syn. Elytrigia), Eragrostis, Leymus, Poa, Puccinellia and Tridens.
