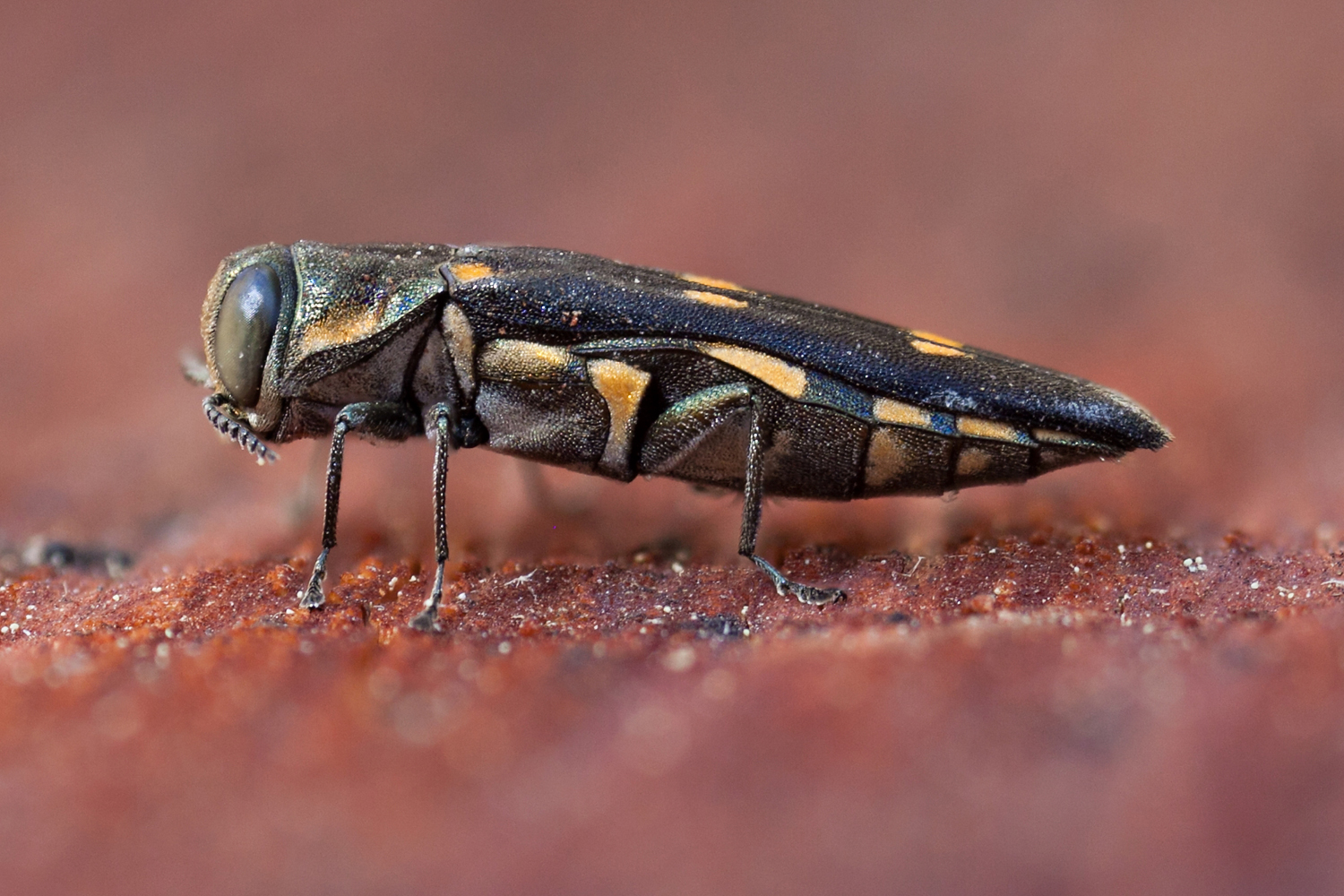

Scientific classification
- Kingdom: Animalia
- Phylum: Arthropoda
- Clade: Pancrustacea
- Class: Insecta
- Order: Coleoptera
- Suborder: Polyphaga
- Infraorder: Elateriformia
- Family: Buprestidae
- Genus: Agrilus
- Species: A. auroguttatus

Binomial name
- Agrilus auroguttatus Schaeffer 1905

= Agrilus auroguttatus =

Species of beetle

Agrilus auroguttatus is a species of jewel beetle in the United States, known by the common name goldspotted oak borer. Native to southeastern Arizona, it is best known for its probably invasive presence in California, destroying stands of oak trees in the Cleveland National Forest in San Diego County. It was originally considered a subspecies of the Central American species Agrilus coxalis, and much of the literature refers to it by this name, but now it is regarded as a separate species, known only from Arizona and California.

== Description ==
The adult gold spotted oak borer is dull dark metallic green in color with three characteristic yellow spots on each forewing. It is about a centimeter long. The larva is white and legless and reaches 18 millimetres (0.71 in) in length. It is extremely difficult to distinguish from Agrilus coxalis, a species known from Mexico and Guatemala.

== History and impact ==
Significant oak mortality was noted in the area near Descanso, California starting in 2002. It was thought that drought was causing the decline until surveys revealed evidence of damage to healthy trees. On investigation it was determined that the agent causing the damage was Agrilus auroguttatus (misidentified as A. coxalis), a beetle not previously noted in the area. The tree species most affected are the coast live oak (Quercus agrifolia) and California black oak (Quercus kelloggii). The canyon live oak (Quercus chrysolepis) and silverleaf oak (Quercus hypoleucoides) are also affected. The insect was first seen at Cuyamaca Rancho State Park in 2004, and it was confirmed to be the cause of oak damage in 2008 when adults and larvae were collected from the host trees.

Since dead oaks were first seen near Descanso, damage was found on 67 percent of oaks examined in surveys, and about 13 percent of the trees were dead. The affected region is an area 50 by 40 kilometres (31 by 25 mi) mostly within National Forest boundaries in the Peninsular Ranges east of San Diego.

Initially, it was estimated that 15,000 individual trees have been killed by this pest. On September 3, 2011, the San Diego Union-Tribune published a correction of this estimate by UC Riverside researchers that puts the number at 80,000 trees killed. Dead trees increase the likelihood and severity of wildfire in this already highly fire-prone area. The distribution of this insect in California has expanded since its initial discovery, and comprises six of the seven southernmost counties.

Little is known about the life history of the insect, whether it is introduced or moving into the area as part of a natural range expansion, or its current distribution. Damage from the beetle takes the form of blackened larval feeding galleries revealed in the wood when woodpeckers remove bark, red and black staining on the bark that occurs when sap drains from damaged phloem, thinning grayish crowns on injured trees, and dead twigs and branches. The adult leaves D-shaped exit holes on the outside of the tree. Current research is aimed toward locating a predator or parasitoid that preys on the beetle larvae, but will not have serious impact on other native species. Until further study yields suggestions for the management of this pest insect, the US Forest Service advises forestry workers to use containment guidelines now in practice for the control of similar jewel beetle pests, such as the emerald ash borer and bronze birch borer. If the beetle was introduced to the area, it may have come in on firewood. Scientists advise against transporting oak wood since it may spread the pest.
