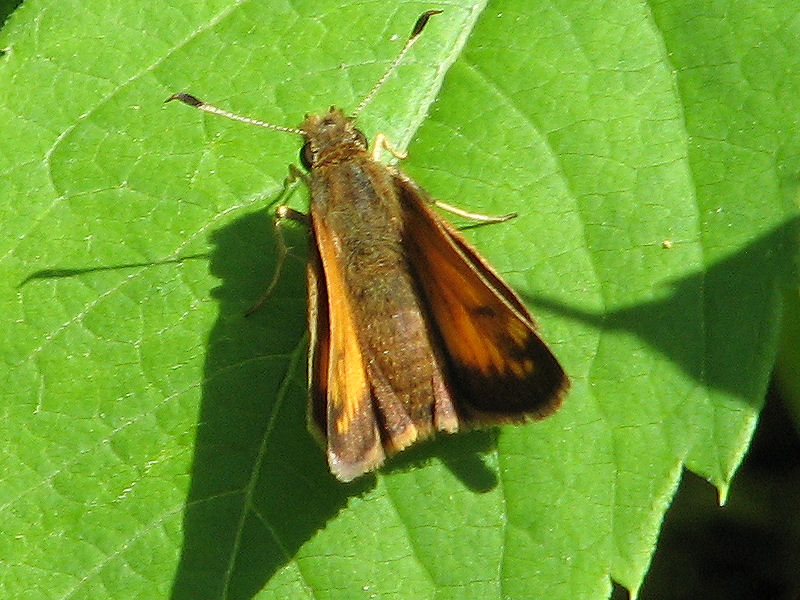
- In Ottawa, Canada

Conservation status
- Secure (NatureServe)

Scientific classification
- Kingdom: Animalia
- Phylum: Arthropoda
- Clade: Pancrustacea
- Class: Insecta
- Order: Lepidoptera
- Family: Hesperiidae
- Genus: Lon
- Species: L. hobomok

Binomial name
- Lon hobomok (Harris, 1862)

Synonyms
- Poanes hobomok

= Hobomok skipper =

Species of butterfly

The Hobomok skipper (Lon hobomok) is a North American butterfly of the family Hesperiidae.

== Description ==
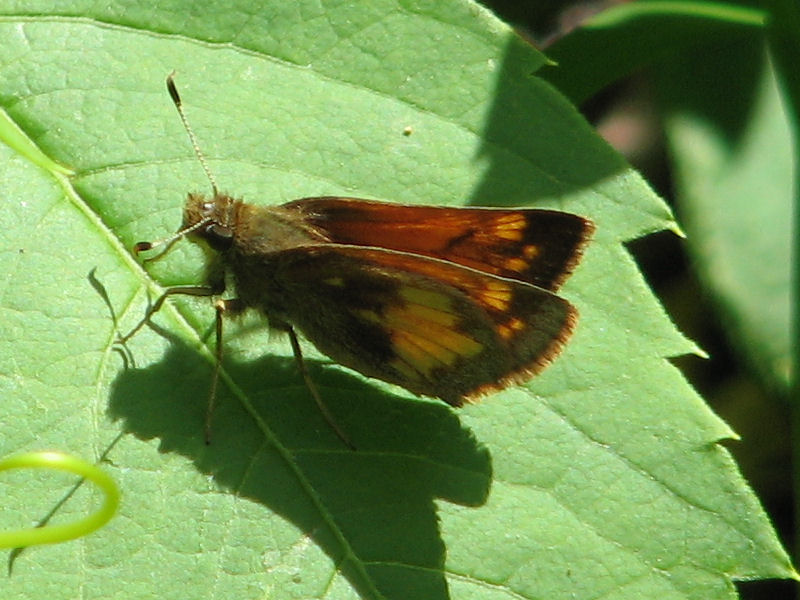
Ventral view

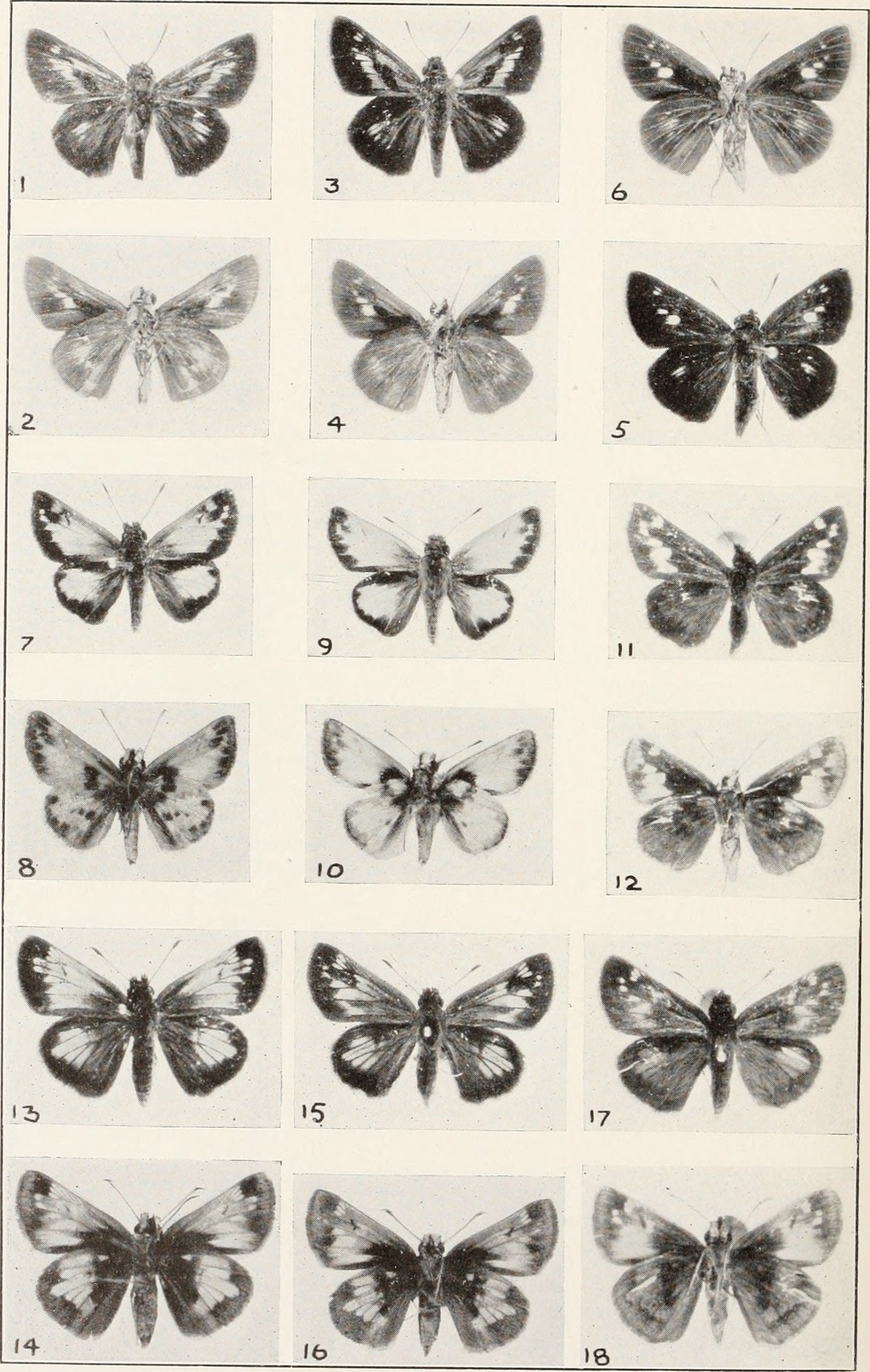
1932 comparison

This small butterfly has slim, triangular wings. The upper side of the male's wings is mostly orange with the margins being dark brown.

== Similar species ==
The only similar species in this skipper's range is the Zabulon skipper.

The Hobomok skipper has a more northern range and different flight period than the Zabulon skipper. They also have more squared wings. The upperside of the male Hobomok skipper's wings has thicker dark margins. The female Hobomok skipper has two forms; the normal form and the "Pocahontas" form. The upper side of the Pocahontas form has smaller glassy spots and has one glassy spot near the fore wing costa.

== Distribution ==
It ranges from eastern Alberta to Nebraska and east to the coasts of Canada and the US.

== Habitat ==
The Hobomok skipper can be found in a wide range of habitats such as clearings, woodland edges, woodland openings, and near roads.

== Flight ==
This butterfly is on the wing from late spring to mid-summer with a single brood.
