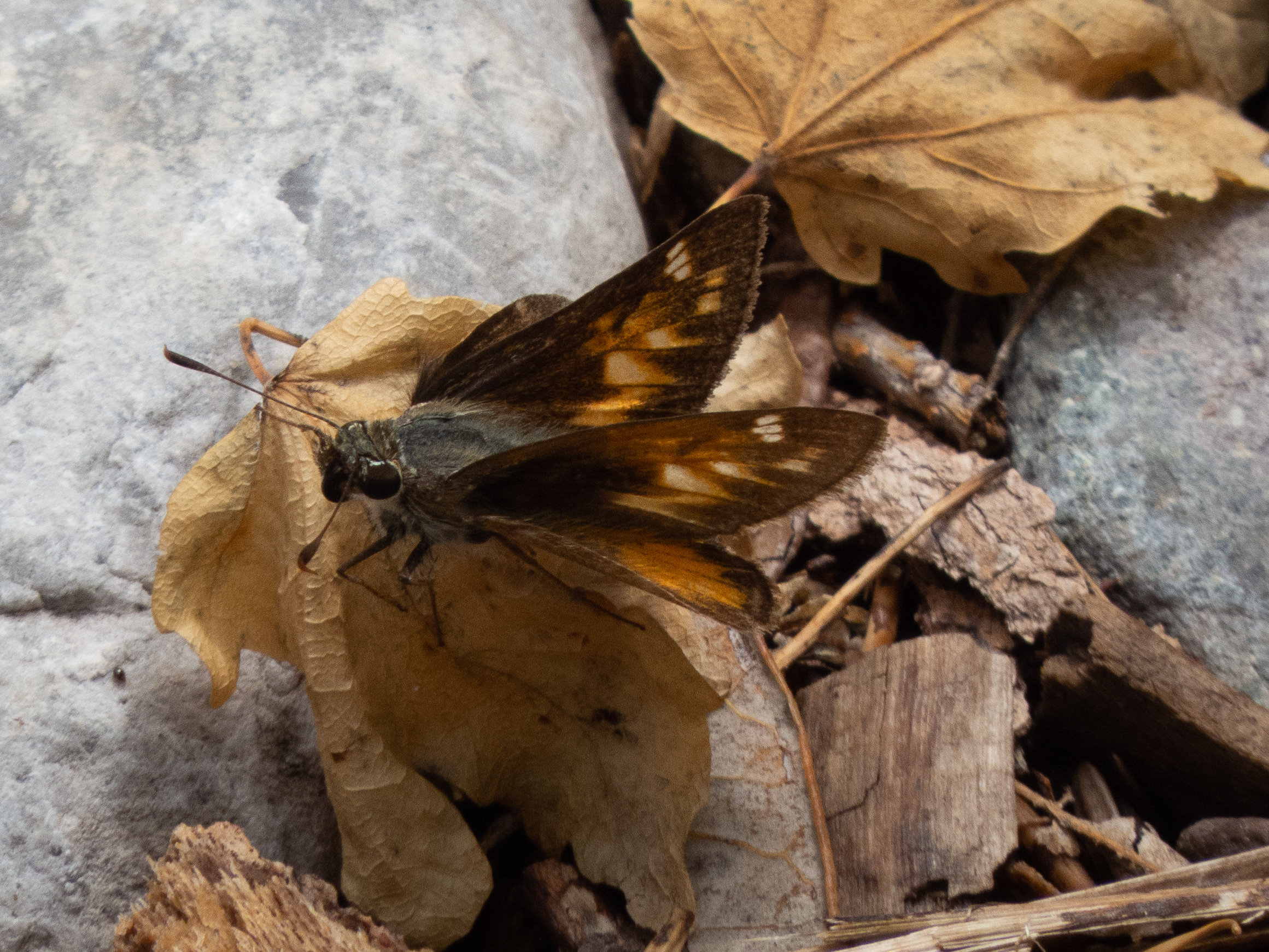

Conservation status
- Secure (NatureServe)

Scientific classification
- Kingdom: Animalia
- Phylum: Arthropoda
- Clade: Pancrustacea
- Class: Insecta
- Order: Lepidoptera
- Family: Hesperiidae
- Genus: Lon
- Species: L. taxiles

Binomial name
- Lon taxiles (W. H. Edwards, 1881)

Synonyms
- Poanes taxiles

= Lon taxiles =

Species of butterfly

Lon taxiles, the taxiles skipper, is a species of grass skipper in the family Hesperiidae. It is found in Central America and North America.
