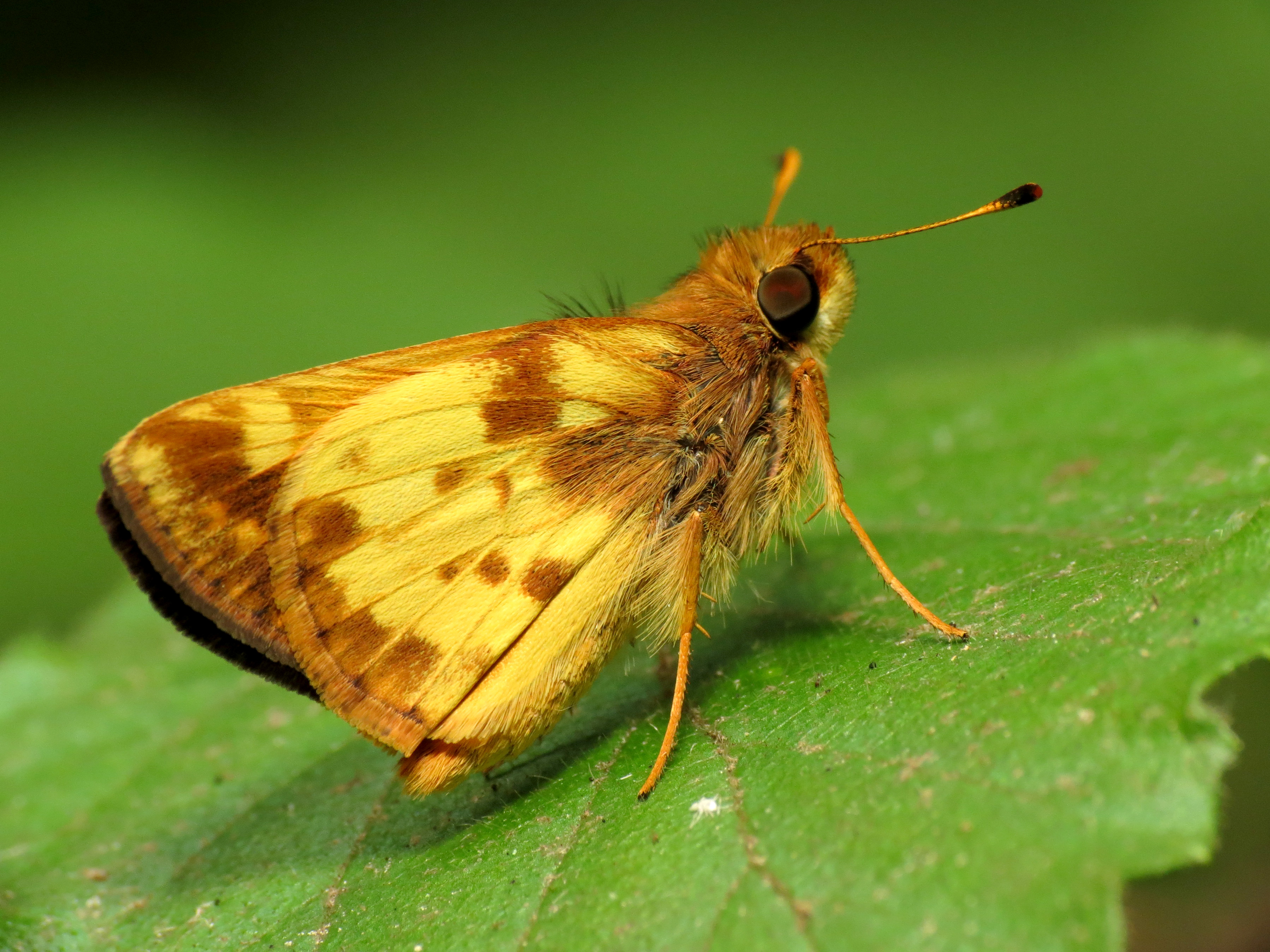
- Male Zabulon skipper, Lon zabulon

Scientific classification
- Kingdom: Animalia
- Phylum: Arthropoda
- Clade: Pancrustacea
- Class: Insecta
- Order: Lepidoptera
- Family: Hesperiidae
- Subtribe: Hesperiina
- Genus: Lon; Grishin, 2019

= Lon (butterfly) =

Genus of butterflies

Lon is a genus of skipper butterflies (family Hesperiidae) found in North and South America. The genus was erected in 2019 by Nick V. Grishin. The name derives from the last syllable of the type species name.

== Species ==
As of 2019, the genus includes 10 species:

- Lon zabulon (Boisduval and Le Conte, 1837) – Zabulon skipper, type species
- Lon hobomok (T. Harris, 1862) – Hobomok skipper
- Lon inimica (Butler and Druce, 1872) – yellow-stained skipper
- Lon taxiles (Edwards, 1881) – golden skipper
- Lon azin (Godman, 1900)
- Lon macneilli (Burns, 1992) – Macneill's skipper
- Lon ulphila (Plötz, 1883) – ulphila skipper
- Lon monticola (Godman, 1900) – oyamel skipper
- Lon niveolimbus (Mabille, 1889) – snow-fringed skipper
- Lon melane (Edwards, 1869) – umber skipper
