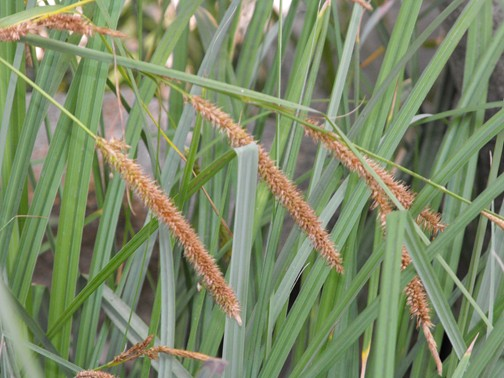

Conservation status
- Apparently Secure (NatureServe)

Scientific classification
- Kingdom: Plantae
- Clade: Tracheophytes
- Clade: Angiosperms
- Clade: Monocots
- Clade: Commelinids
- Order: Poales
- Family: Cyperaceae
- Genus: Carex
- Species: C. spissa

Binomial name
- Carex spissa L.H.Bailey ex Hemsl.

= Carex spissa =

Species of grass-like plant

Carex spissa is a species of sedge known by the common name San Diego sedge in the family Cyperaceae. It is native to the southwestern United States in California, Arizona, and New Mexico, and far northern Mexico. It grows in wet places such as seeps and streambanks, sometimes on serpentine soils. This sedge looks somewhat like a cattail. It produces angled stems easily exceeding a meter in height surrounded by leathery green to reddish leaves up to about 1.2 meters long. The inflorescence is up to 80 centimeters long, with many long reddish brown flower spikes, each holding up to 300 developing fruits.
