= List of hesperiid genera =

List of genera of family Hesperiidae

The large Lepidoptera family Hesperiidae (skippers) contains the following genera:

A B C D E F G H I J K L M N O P Q R S T U V W X Y Z
