= List of hesperiid genera: A =

The large Lepidoptera family Hesperiidae (skippers) contains the following genera:

A B C D E F G H I J K L M N O P Q R S T U V W X Y Z

- Abantis
- Abaratha
- Abraximorpha
- Acada
- Acallopistes
- Acerbas
- Achalarus
- Achlyodes
- Acleros
- Acromecis
- Actinor
- Adlerodea
- Adopaeoides
- Adopoea
- Aegiale
- Aella
- Aeromachus
- Aethilla
- Agara
- Agathymus
- Aguna
- Aides
- Alenia
- Alera
- Alerema
- Allora
- Amblyscirtes
- Amenis
- Ametron
- Ampittia
- Amysoria
- Anastrus
- Anatrytone
- Ancistrocampta
- Ancistroides
- Ancyloxypha
- Andinus
- Andronymus
- Anisochoria
- Anisynta
- Anisyntoides
- Anthomaster
- Anthoptus
- Antigonus
- Antipodia
- Apallaga
- Apaustus
- Apostictopterus
- Appia
- Apyrrothrix
- Ardaris
- Argon
- Argopteron
- Arita
- Arnetta
- Aroma
- Arotis
- Arrhenes
- Arteurotia
- Artines
- Artitropa
- Arunena
- Asbolis
- Aspitha
- Astictopterus
- Astraptes
- Atalopedes
- Atarnes
- Ateleomorpha
- Atrytone
- Atrytonopsis
- Aubertia
- Augiades
- Aurina
- Autochton
- Azonax
