= List of hesperiid genera: S =

The large Lepidoptera family Hesperiidae (skippers) contains the following genera:

A B C D E F G H I J K L M N O P Q R S T U V W X Y Z

- Sabera
- Sabina
- Sacrator
- Salanoemia
- Salatis
- Saliana
- Sancus
- Saniba
- Sapaea
- Sape
- Sarangesa
- Sarbia
- Sarega
- Sarmientoia
- Sartora
- Satarupa
- Saturnus
- Scelotrix
- Schausana
- Scobura
- Sebastonyma
- Semalea
- Sepa
- Serdis
- Seseria
- Signeta
- Sodalia
- Sophista
- Sostrata
- Sovia
- Spathilepia
- Spialia
- Spioniades
- Stallingsia
- Stethotrix
- Stimula
- Stinga
- Stomyles
- Styriodes
- Suada
- Suastus
- Sucova
- Suniana
- Synale
- Synapte
- Systasea
- Systaspes
