= List of hesperiid genera: C =

The large Lepidoptera family Hesperiidae (skippers) contains the following genera:

A B C D E F G H I J K L M N O P Q R S T U V W X Y Z

- Cabares
- Cabirus
- Caenides
- Caicella
- Caligulana
- Calleagris
- Calliades
- Calliana
- Callimormus
- Calpodes
- Caltoris
- Camptopleura
- Cantha
- Capila
- Caprona
- Carcharodus
- Carrhenes
- Carterocephalus
- Carystina
- Carystoides
- Carystus
- Catia
- Cecropterus
- Celaenorrhinus
- Celotes
- Cephise
- Cephrenes
- Ceratrichia
- Chaetocneme
- Chaetoneura
- Chalcone
- Chalypyge
- Chamunda
- Charidia
- Charmion
- Chioides
- Chiomara
- Chioneigia
- Chitralia
- Chloeria
- Choaspes
- Chondrolepis
- Choranthus
- Chrysoplectrum
- Clito
- Cobaloides
- Cobalopsis
- Cobalus
- Cocceius
- Codatractus
- Coeliades
- Cogia
- Coladenia
- Conga
- Conognathus
- Copaeodes
- Cornuphallus
- Corticea
- Cravera
- Creonpyge
- Creteus
- Croitana
- Croniades
- Crossiura
- Ctenoptilum
- Cumbre
- Cupitha
- Cyanopyge
- Cycloglypha
- Cyclopides
- Cyclopyge
- Cyclosemia
- Cyclosma
- Cymaenes
- Cynea
