= List of hesperiid genera: T =

The large Lepidoptera family Hesperiidae (skippers) contains the following genera:

A B C D E F G H I J K L M N O P Q R S T U V W X Y Z

- Tagiades
- Talides
- Tamela
- Tamyris
- Tapena
- Taractrocera
- Tarmia
- Tarsoctenus
- Tavetana
- Tecupa
- Telegonus
- Telemiades
- Telicota
- Telles
- Tellona
- Teniorhinus
- Teria
- Thargella
- Theagenes
- Themesion
- Thespieus
- Thessia
- Thoon
- Thoressa
- Thorybes
- Thracides
- Thymelicus
- Tiacellia
- Tigasis
- Timochares
- Timochreon
- Timoconia
- Tirynthia
- Tirynthoides
- Tisias
- Tosta
- Tothrix
- Toxidia
- Trapezites
- Tricosemeia
- Trina
- Trioedusa
- Tromba
- Tsitana
- Turesis
- Turmada
- Turnerina
- Typhedanus
