= List of hesperiid genera: L =

The large Lepidoptera family Hesperiidae (skippers) contains the following genera:

A B C D E F G H I J K L M N O P Q R S T U V W X Y Z

- Lamponia
- Lento
- Leona
- Lepella
- Leptalina
- Lerema
- Lerodea
- Leucochitonea
- Leucoscirtes
- Levina
- Libra
- Librita
- Lignyostola
- Limochores
- Lindra
- Lobocla
- Lophoides
- Lotongus
- Loxolexis
- Lucida
- Ludens
- Lycas
- Lychnuchoides
- Lychnuchus
