= List of hesperiid genera: Z =

The large Lepidoptera family Hesperiidae (skippers) contains the following genera:

A B C D E F G H I J K L M N O P Q R S T U V W X Y Z

- Zalomes
- Zampa
- Zariaspes
- Zea
- Zehala
- Zela
- Zenida
- Zenis
- Zenonia
- Zera
- Zestusa
- Zinaida
- Zobera
- Zographetus
- Zonia
- Zophopetes
- Zopyrion
