= List of hesperiid genera: O =

The large Lepidoptera family Hesperiidae (skippers) contains the following genera:

A B C D E F G H I J K L M N O P Q R S T U V W X Y Z

- Oarisma
- Ocella
- Ochlodes
- Ochropyge
- Ochus
- Ocybadistes
- Ocytes
- Odina
- Odontoptilum
- Oechydrus
- Oedaloneura
- Oenides
- Oeonus
- Oerane
- Oileides
- Oligoria
- Onenses
- Onespa
- Onophas
- Onryza
- Onzis
- Oreisplanus
- Oriens
- Orneates
- Orphe
- Orses
- Ortholexis
- Orthophoetus
- Orthos
- Osmodes
- Osphantes
- Ouleus
- Oxynetra
- Oxynthes
- Oxypalpus
- Oxytoxia
