= List of hesperiid genera: N =

The large Lepidoptera family Hesperiidae (skippers) contains the following genera:

A B C D E F G H I J K L M N O P Q R S T U V W X Y Z

- Naevolus
- Narcosius
- Narga
- Nascus
- Nastra
- Neochlodes
- Neohesperilla
- Neospialia
- Neoxeniades
- Nerula
- Netrobalane
- Netrocoryne
- Niconiades
- Nisoniades
- Noctuana
- Nosphistia
- Notocrypta
- Nyctelius
- Nyctus
- Nylla
