= List of hesperiid genera: G =

The large Lepidoptera family Hesperiidae (skippers) contains the following genera:

A B C D E F G H I J K L M N O P Q R S T U V W X Y Z

- Galerga
- Gallio
- Gamia
- Gangara
- Garga
- Ge
- Gecana
- Gegenes
- Gehenna
- Gehlota
- Gerosis
- Gesta
- Gindanes
- Gomalia
- Gorgopas
- Gorgophone
- Gogyra
- Gorgythion
- Grais
- Granila
- Gretna
- Gunayan
- Gyrogra
