= List of hesperiid genera: H =

The large Lepidoptera family Hesperiidae (skippers) contains the following genera:

A B C D E F G H I J K L M N O P Q R S T U V W X Y Z

- Haemactis
- Halotus
- Halpe
- Hansa
- Hantana
- Hasora
- Hedone
- Hegesippe
- Helias
- Heliopetes
- Heliopyrgus
- Hemipteris
- Herimosa
- Heronia
- Hesperia
- Hesperilla
- Hesperopsis
- Heteropterus
- Hewitsoniella
- Hidari
- Holguinia
- Hovala
- Hyalothyrus
- Hyarotis
- Hylephila
- Hypocryptothrix
- Hypoleucis
