= List of hesperiid genera: B =

The large Lepidoptera family Hesperiidae (skipper butterflies) contains the following genera:

A B C D E F G H I J K L M N O P Q R S T U V W X Y Z

- Badamia
- Banta
- Baoris
- Baorynnis
- Baracus
- Barca
- Basslerodea
- Biaka
- Bibasis
- Bibla
- Binghamia
- Bolla
- Borbo
- Brachycoryne
- Brontiades
- Bruna
- Brusa
- Bungalotis
- Burca
- Butleria
- Buzyges
