= List of hesperiid genera: E =

The large Lepidoptera family Hesperiidae (skippers) contains the following genera:

A B C D E F G H I J K L M N O P Q R S T U V W X Y Z

- Eagris
- Eantis
- Ebrietas
- Ebusus
- Echelatus
- Ectomis
- Eetion
- Elbella
- Enosis
- Entheus
- Eogenes
- Epargyreus
- Epinosis
- Epiphyes
- Eprius
- Eracon
- Eretis
- Eridamus
- Erionota
- Erynnis
- Euphyes
- Euroto
- Euschemon
- Eutocus
- Eutychide
- Evansiella
- Exometoeca
