= List of hesperiid genera: K =

The large Lepidoptera family Hesperiidae (skippers) contains the following genera:

A B C D E F G H I J K L M N O P Q R S T U V W X Y Z

- Katreus
- Kedestes
- Kerana
- Kineta
- Kobrona
- Koruthaialos
