= List of hesperiid genera: D =

The large Lepidoptera family Hesperiidae (skippers) contains the following genera:

A B C D E F G H I J K L M N O P Q R S T U V W X Y Z

- Daimio
- Dalla
- Damas
- Daratus
- Dardarina
- Darpa
- Decinea
- Diaeus
- Dicranaspis
- Dicrosema
- Dion
- Dis
- Dispar
- Doberes
- Drephalys
- Dubiella
- Dyscophellus
- Dysenius
