= Enosis (disambiguation) =

Enosis is the political movement for the incorporation of territory into the Greek state.

Enosis may also refer to:

- Enosis (butterfly), a genus of grass skipper butterflies

== See also ==
- Ensis, a genus of clams
- Henosis, a mystical process of unity with the One
- List of football clubs in Greece
- List of political parties in Greece
