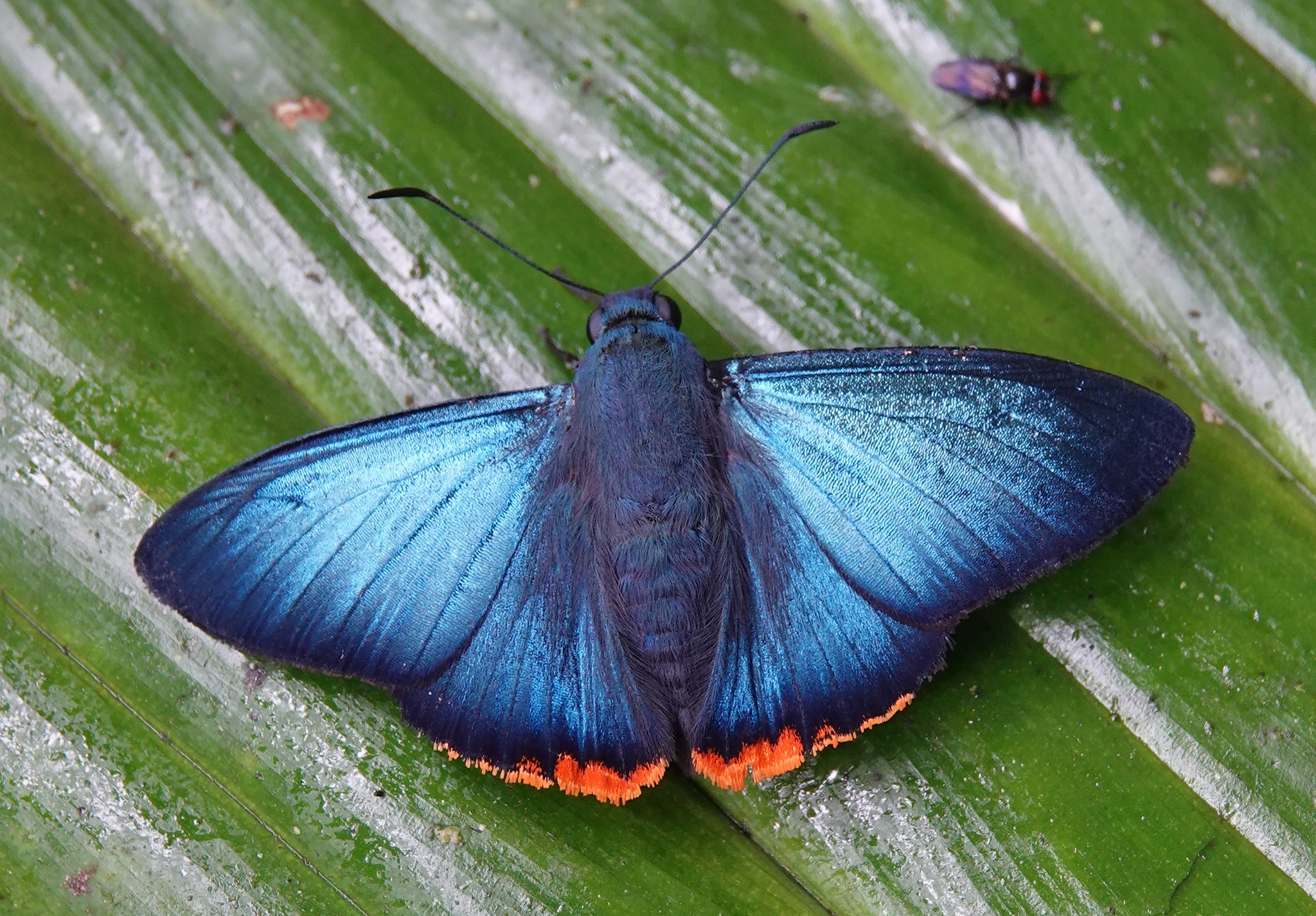
- Chalypyge zereda

Scientific classification
- Kingdom: Animalia
- Phylum: Arthropoda
- Class: Insecta
- Order: Lepidoptera
- Family: Hesperiidae
- Genus: Chalypyge; Mielke, 2002

= Chalypyge =

Genus of butterflies

Chalypyge is a Neotropical genus of firetips in the family Hesperiidae.

== Species ==
- Chalypyge chalybea (Scudder, 1872)
- Chalypyge zereda (Hewitson, [1866])
