= List of hesperiid genera: J =

The large Lepidoptera family Hesperiidae (skippers) contains the following genera:

A B C D E F G H I J K L M N O P Q R S T U V W X Y Z

- Jemadia
- Jera
- Joanna
- Jonaspyge
- Jongiana
- Justinia
