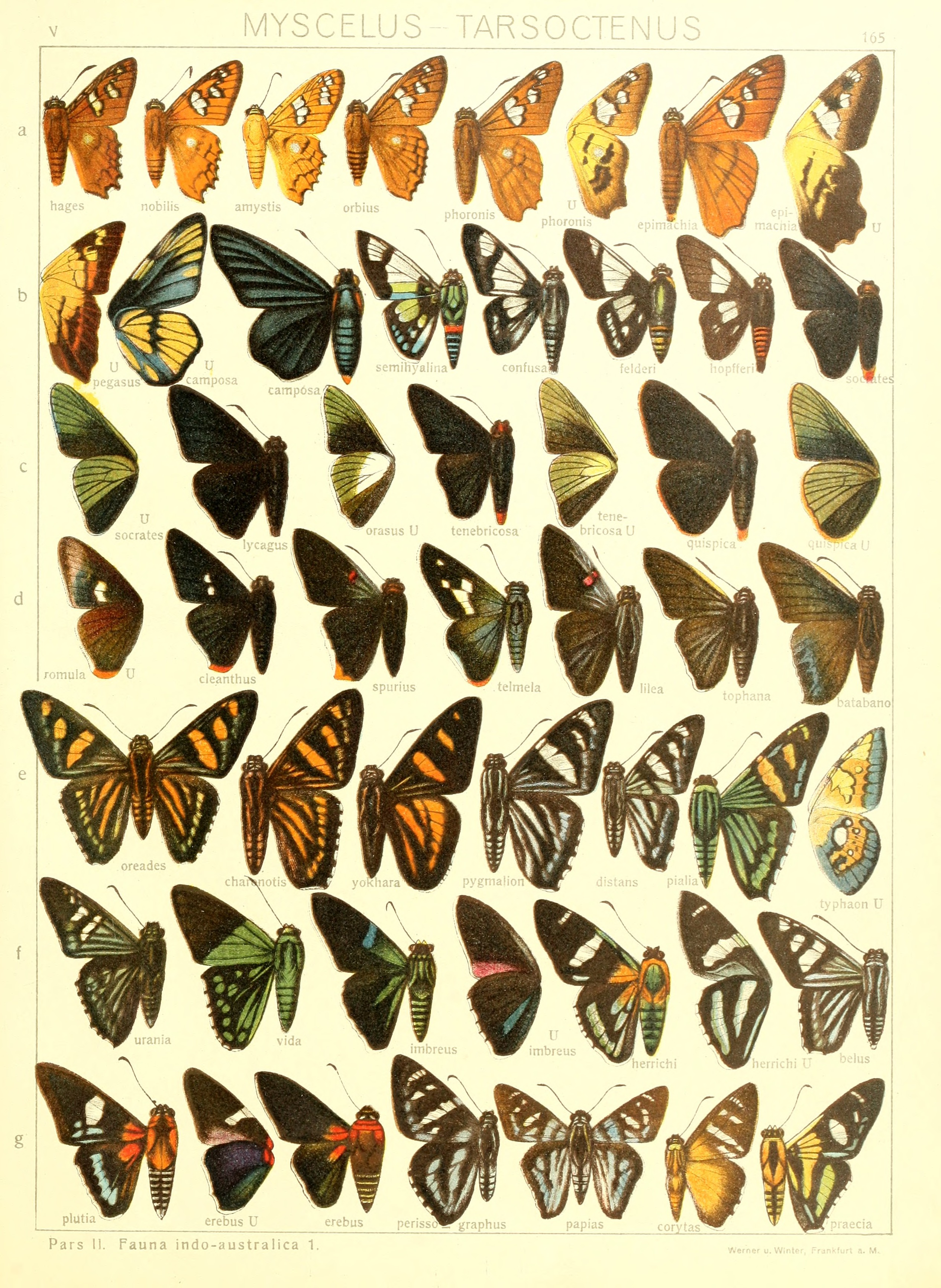
- Oxynetra and related genera in Adalbert Seitz's Macrolepidoptera of the World

Scientific classification
- Kingdom: Animalia
- Phylum: Arthropoda
- Class: Insecta
- Order: Lepidoptera
- Family: Hesperiidae
- Genus: Oxynetra; C. & R. Felder, 1862

= Oxynetra =

Genus of butterflies

Oxynetra is a genus of firetips in the family Hesperiidae.

== Species ==
- Oxynetra confusa Staudinger, 1888 Argentina, Peru
- Oxynetra hopfferi Staudinger, [1888] Panama
- Oxynetra semihyalina C. & R. Felder, 1862 Peru
