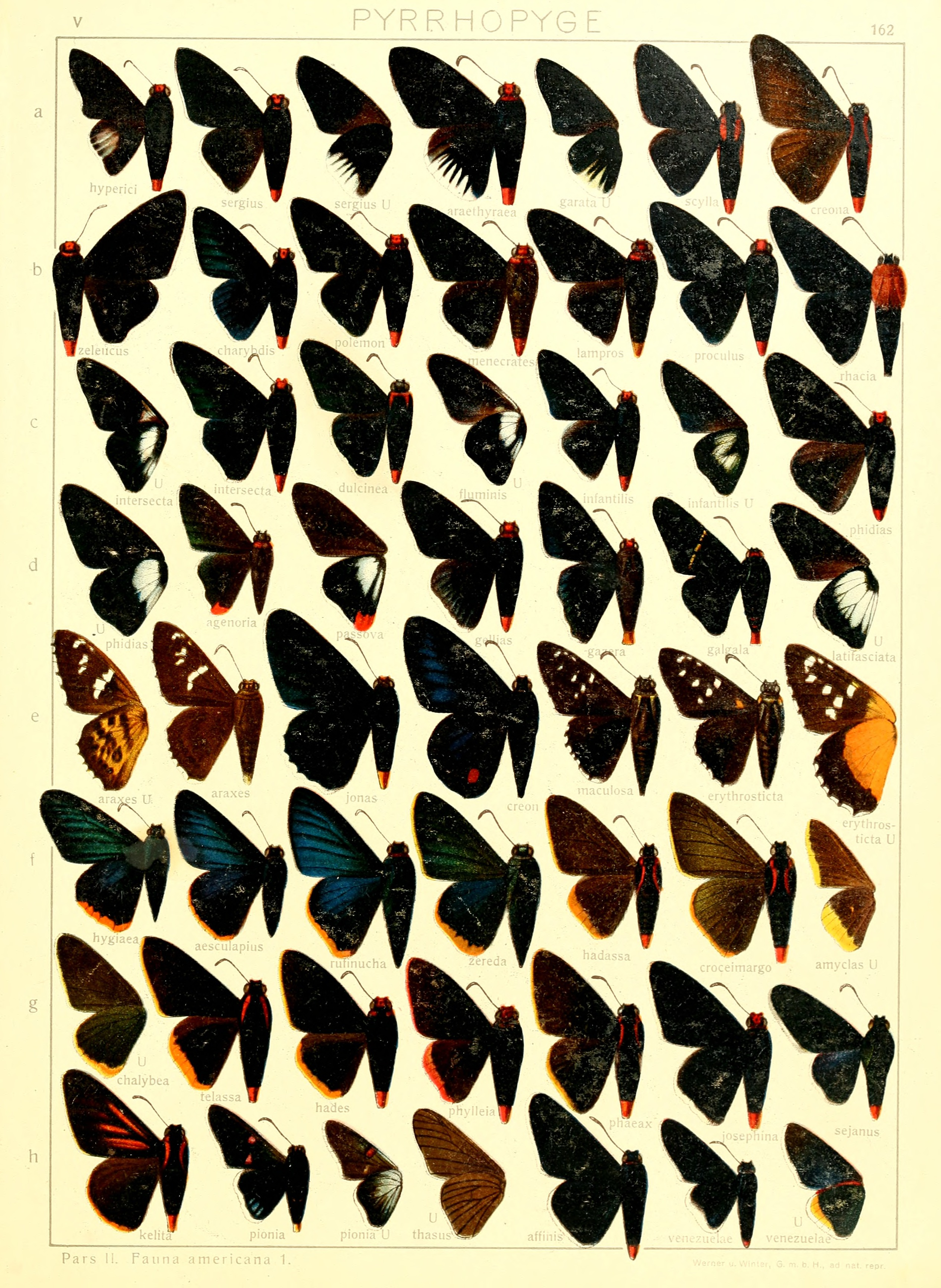
- Jonaspyge aesculapus in Adalbert Seitz's Macrolepidoptera of the World

Scientific classification
- Kingdom: Animalia
- Phylum: Arthropoda
- Class: Insecta
- Order: Lepidoptera
- Family: Hesperiidae
- Genus: Jonaspyge; Mielke, 2002

= Jonaspyge =

Genus of butterflies

Jonaspyge is a Neotropical genus of firetips in the family Hesperiidae.

== Species ==
- Jonaspyge aesculapus (Staudinger, 1876) Costa Rica, Panama, Colombia, Ecuador
- Jonaspyge jonas (C. & R. Felder, 1859) Mexico, Guatemala, Nicaragua
- Jonaspyge tzotzili (Freeman, 1969) Mexico
