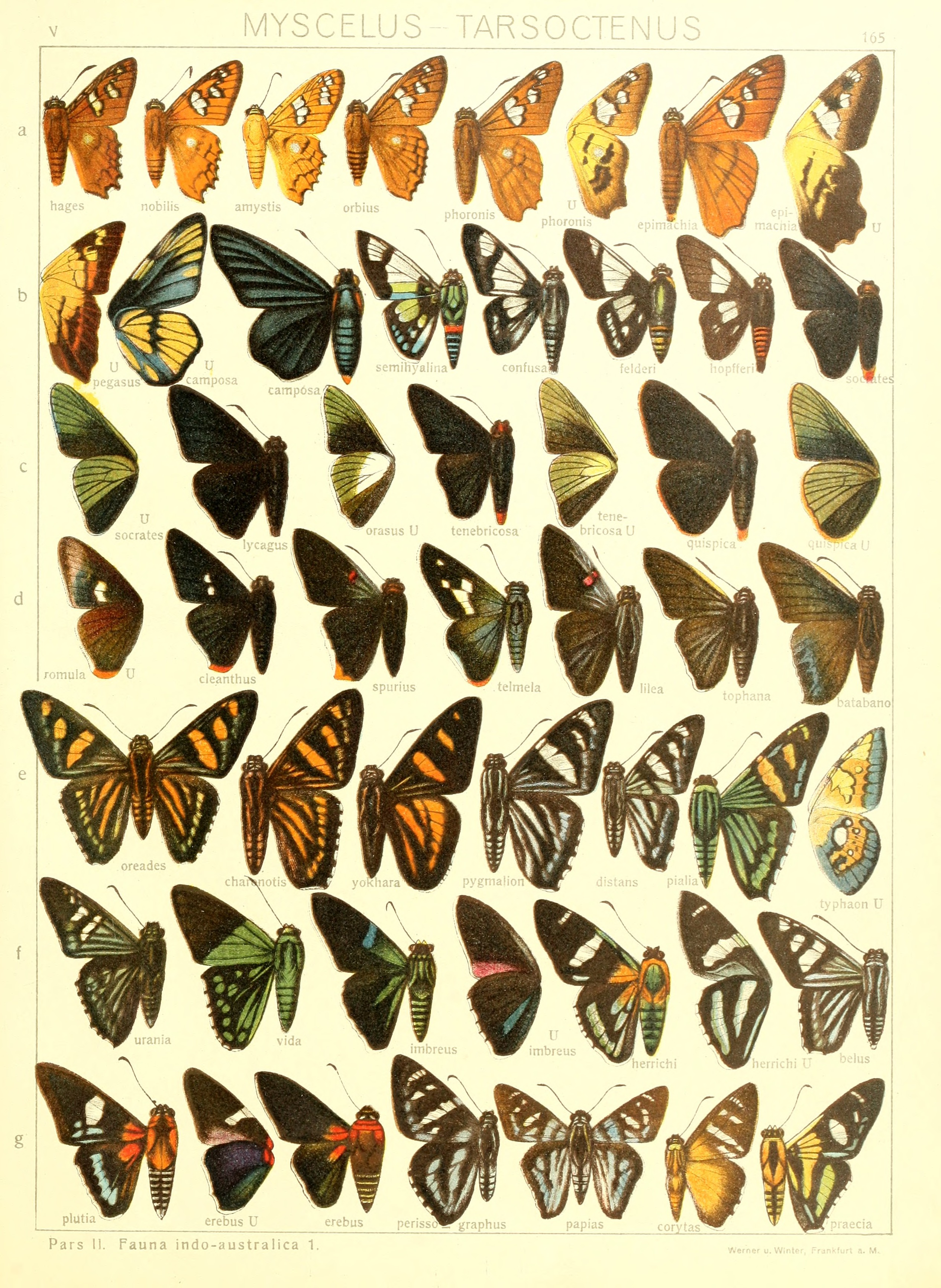
- Azonax and related genera depicted in Seitz Macrolepidoptera of the World

Scientific classification
- Kingdom: Animalia
- Phylum: Arthropoda
- Class: Insecta
- Order: Lepidoptera
- Family: Hesperiidae
- Genus: Azonax; Godman & Salvin, 1893

= Azonax =

Genus of butterflies

Azonax is a Neotropical genus of Firetips in the family Hesperiidae.The genus is monotypic containing the single species Azonax typhaon (Hewitson, 1877) present in Mexico, French Guiana and Nicaragua.
