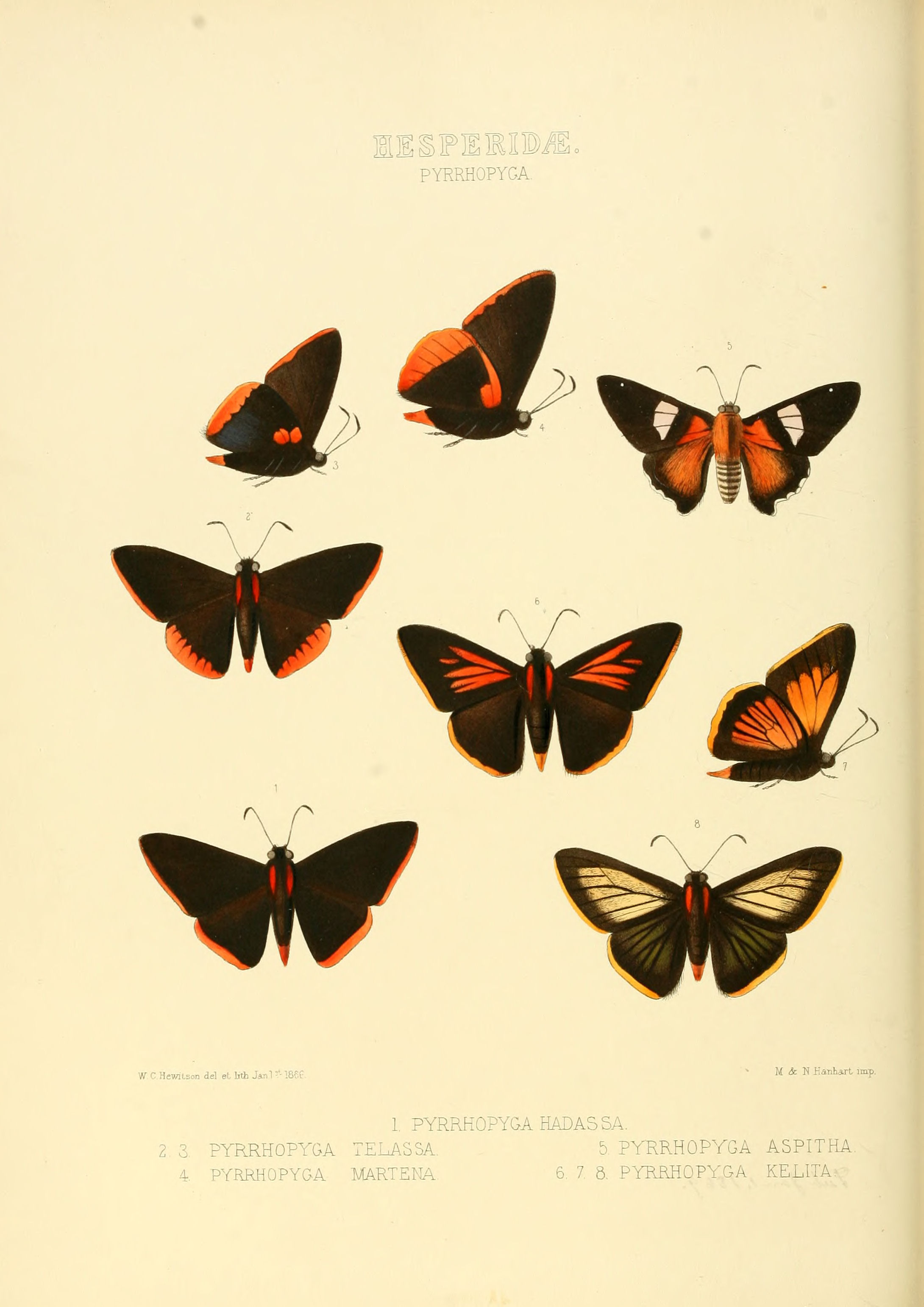
- Aspitha aspitha and related species in the genus Pyrrhopyge

Scientific classification
- Kingdom: Animalia
- Phylum: Arthropoda
- Class: Insecta
- Order: Lepidoptera
- Family: Hesperiidae
- Subfamily: Pyrginae
- Genus: Aspitha; Evans, 1951

= Aspitha =

Genus of butterflies

Aspitha is a Neotropical genus of firetips in the family Hesperiidae.

== Species ==
- Aspitha agenoria (Hewitson, 1876) Bolivia, Peru
- Aspitha aspitha (Hewitson, [1866]) Brazil, Surinam, Guyane
- Aspitha bassleri (Bell, 1940) Peru
- Aspitha leander (Boullet, 1912) Colombia
