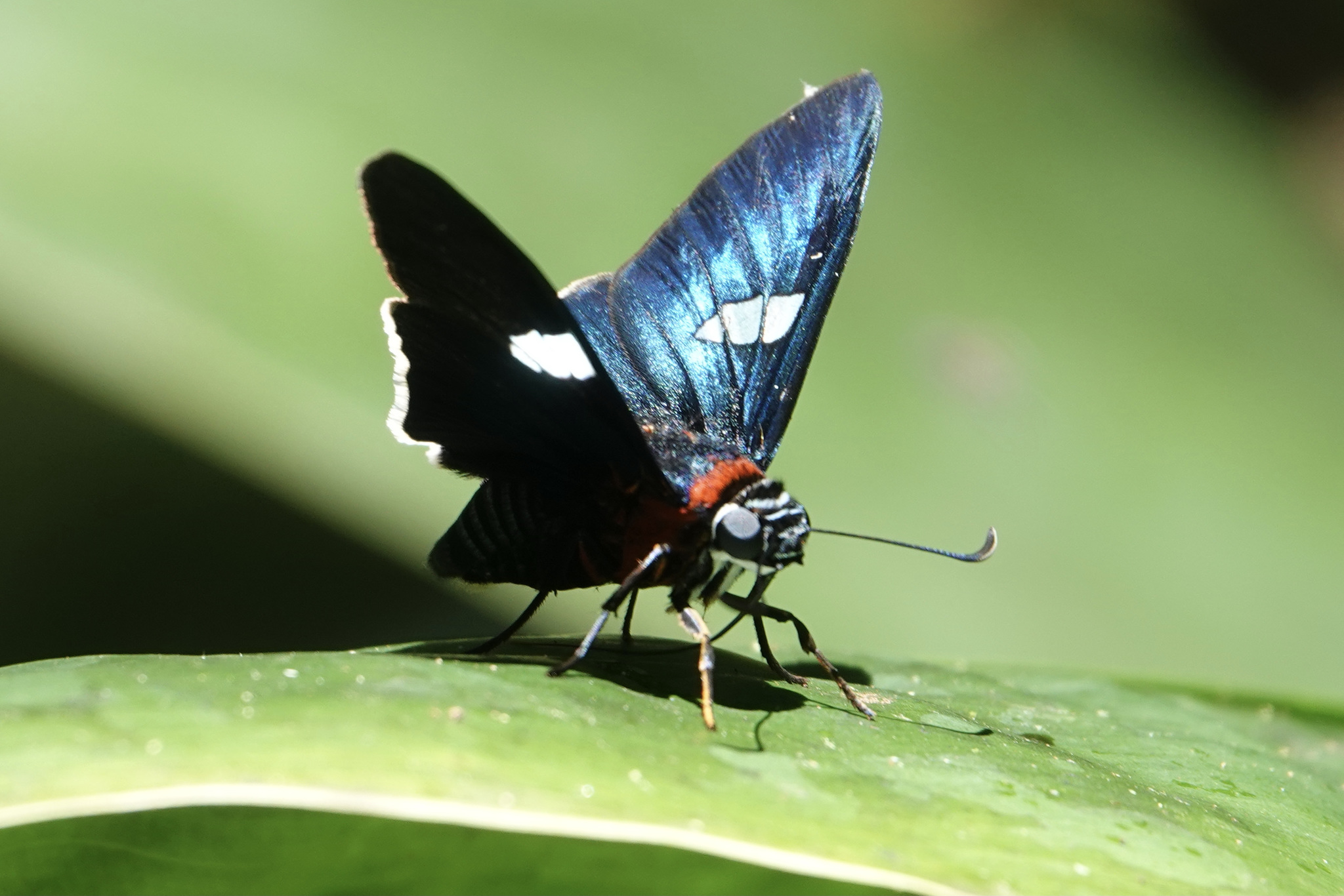
- Gunayan rubricollis

Scientific classification
- Kingdom: Animalia
- Phylum: Arthropoda
- Class: Insecta
- Order: Lepidoptera
- Family: Hesperiidae
- Genus: Gunayan; Mielke, 2002

= Gunayan =

Genus of butterflies

Gunayan is a Neotropical genus of firetips in the family Hesperiidae.

== Species ==
- Gunayan rhacia (Hewitson, 1875) Brazil, Venezuela
- Gunayan rubricollis (Sepp, [1841]) Brazil, Suriname
- Gunayan timaeus (Bell, 1931) Peru
