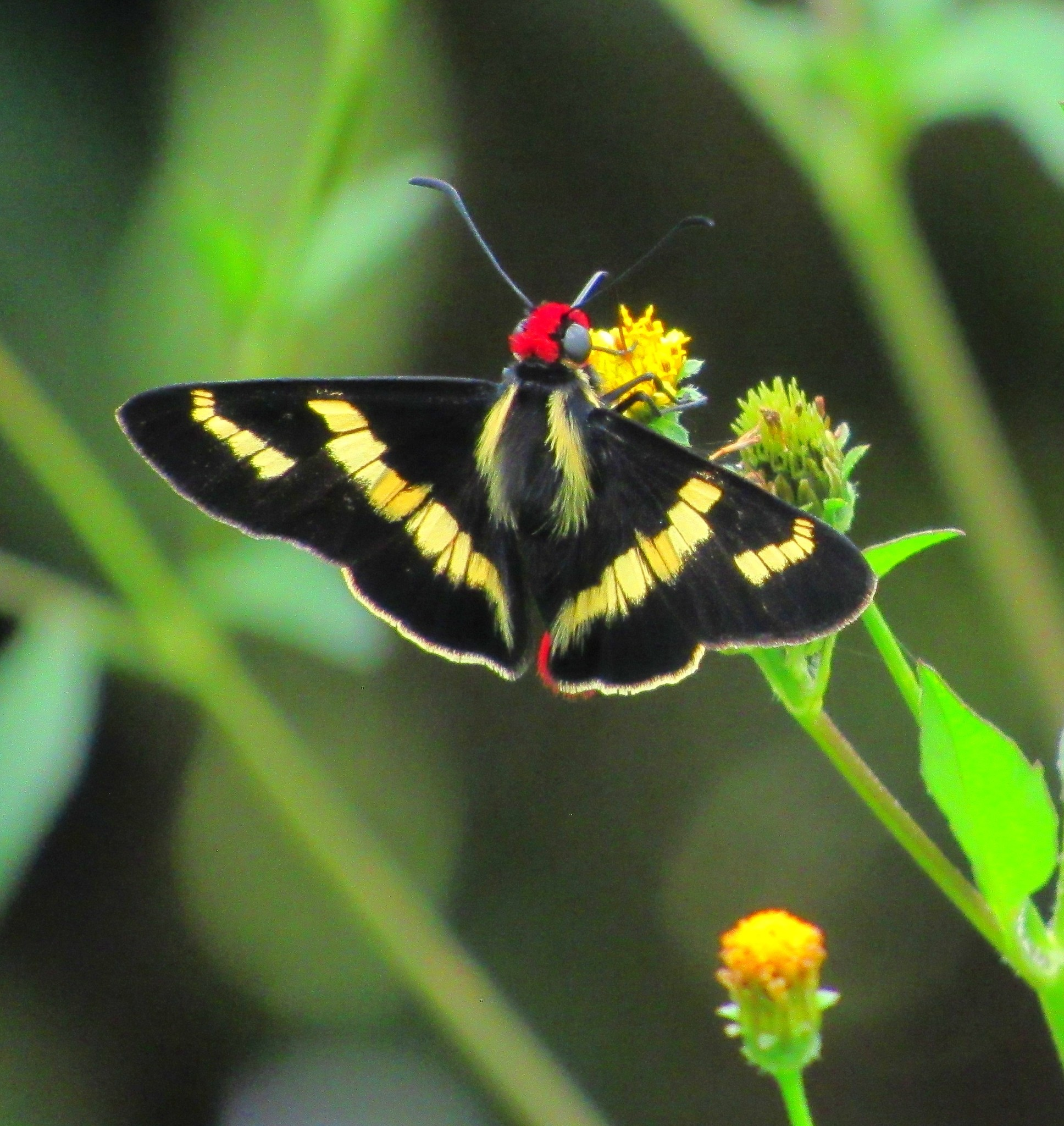
- Sarbia damippe

Scientific classification
- Kingdom: Animalia
- Phylum: Arthropoda
- Class: Insecta
- Order: Lepidoptera
- Family: Hesperiidae
- Genus: Sarbia; Watson, 1893

= Sarbia (skipper) =

Genus of butterflies

Sarbia is a Neotropical genus of firetips in the family Hesperiidae.

== Species ==
- Sarbia antias (C. & R. Felder, 1859) Brazil
- Sarbia catomelaena Mabille & Boullet, 1908 Brazil
- Sarbia curitiba Mielke & Casagrande, 2002 Brazil (Paraná)
- Sarbia damippe Mabille & Boullet, 1908 Brazil (Rio Grande do Sul)
- Sarbia oneka (Hewitson, 1866) Venezuela
- Sarbia pertyi (Plötz, 1879) Brazil
- Sarbia soza Evans, 1951 Brazil (Paraná)
- Sarbia xanthippe (Latreille, [1824]) Brazil
  - S. xanthippe xanthippe Brazil
  - S. xanthippe spixii (Plötz, 1879) Brazil
