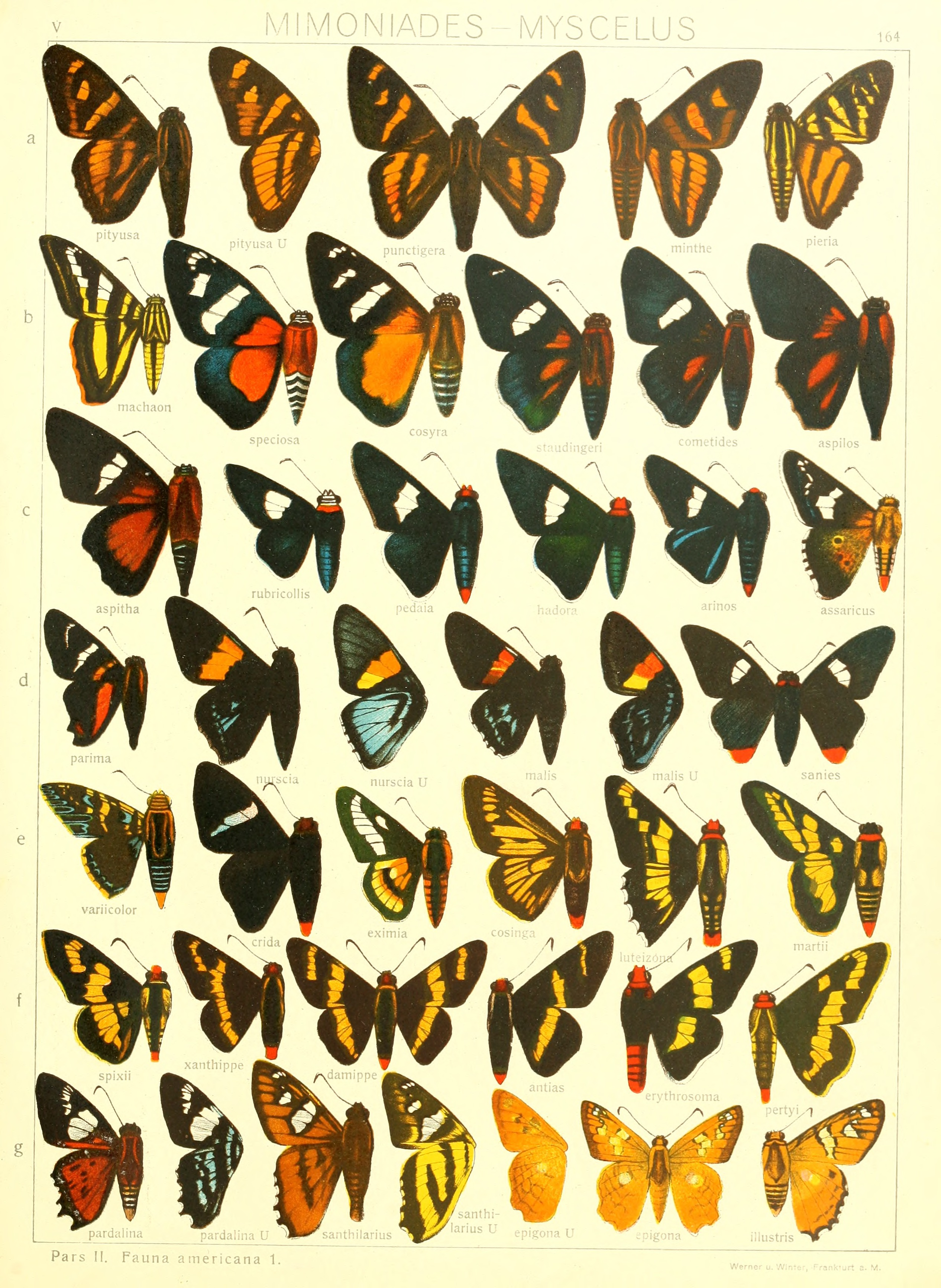
- Ardaris and related genera depicted in Adalbert Seitz's Macrolepidoptera of the World

Scientific classification
- Kingdom: Animalia
- Phylum: Arthropoda
- Class: Insecta
- Order: Lepidoptera
- Family: Hesperiidae
- Tribe: Pyrrhopygini
- Genus: Ardaris; Watson, 1893

= Ardaris =

Genus of butterflies

Ardaris is a Neotropical genus of firetips in the family Hesperiidae. It includes two endemic species that are restricted to mountain forests and páramos in the Cordillera de Mérida, Venezuela.

== Species ==
- Ardaris eximia (Hewitson, 1871)
- Ardaris hantra Evans, 1951
