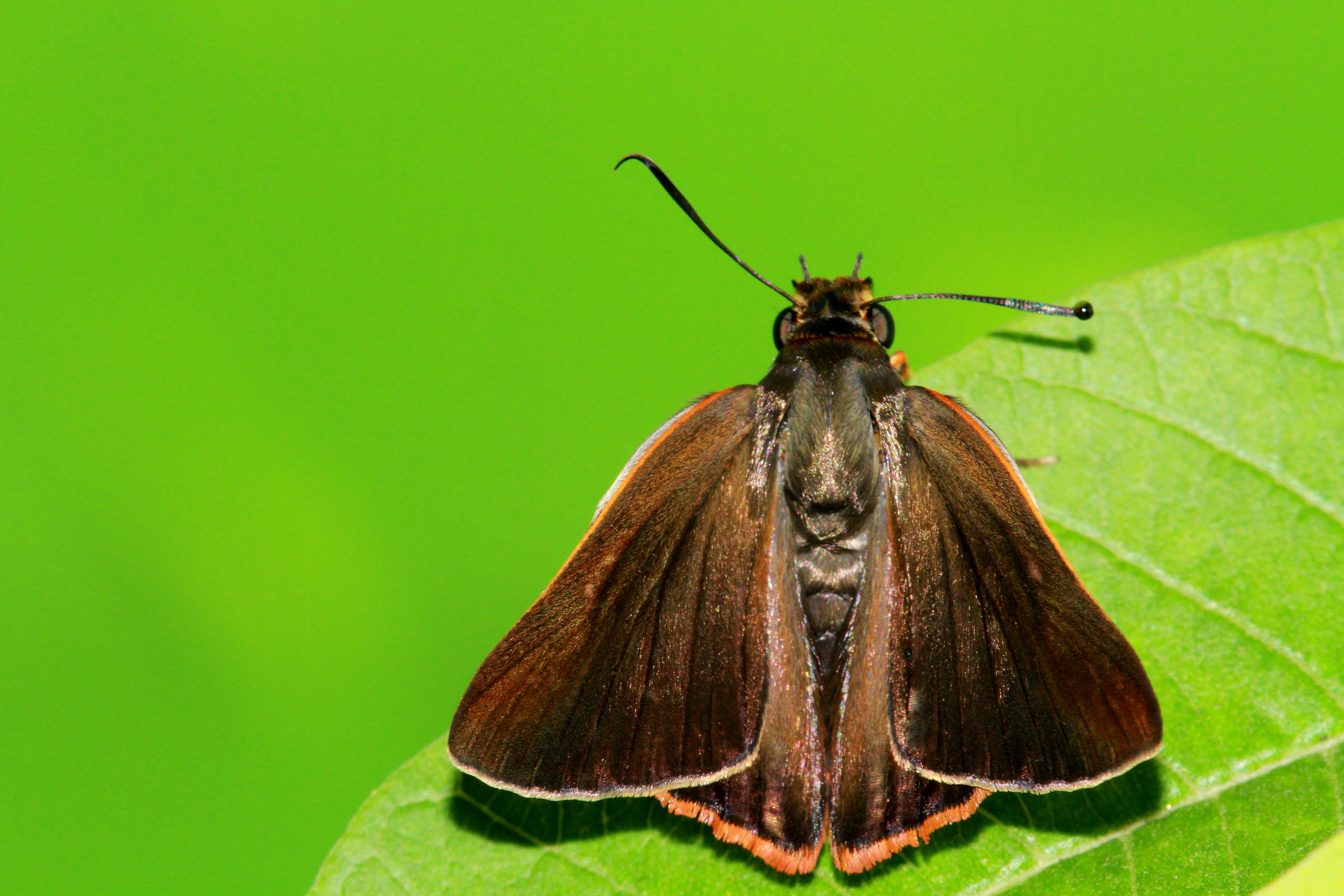
- Dorsal view
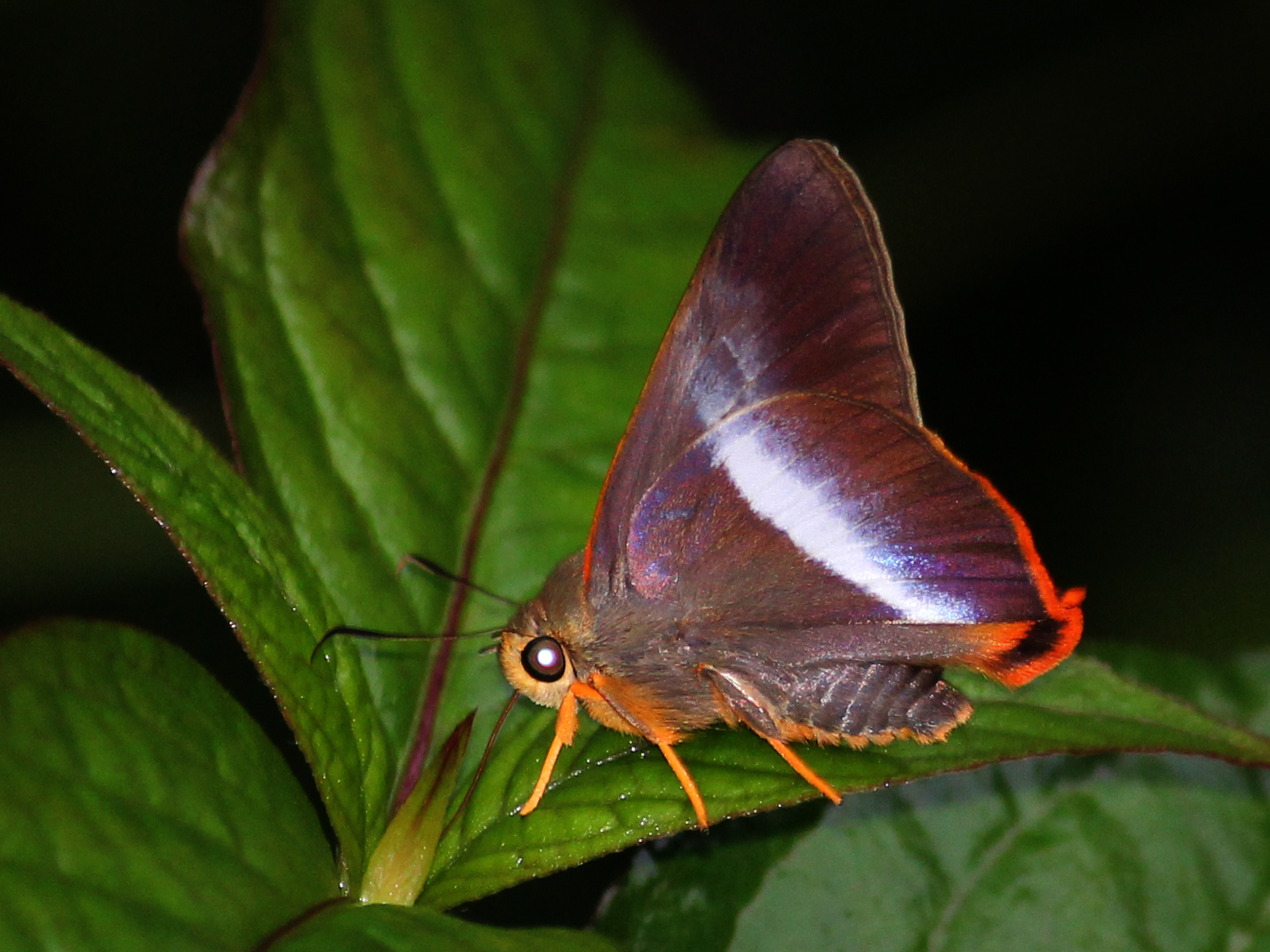
- Ventral view

Scientific classification
- Kingdom: Animalia
- Phylum: Arthropoda
- Clade: Pancrustacea
- Class: Insecta
- Order: Lepidoptera
- Family: Hesperiidae
- Genus: Bibasis
- Species: B. sena

Binomial name
- Bibasis sena (Moore, 1865)

= Bibasis sena =

Orange-tail awl

Species of butterfly

Bibasis sena, commonly known as the orange-tailed awlet, is a butterfly belonging to the family Hesperiidae, the skippers. It is also sometimes called the pale green awlet though that name can also refer to Burara gomata.

== Distribution ==
This skipper is found in Sri Lanka, India, China (Hainan), Myanmar, Cambodia, Thailand, Laos, Vietnam, Malaysia (Malay peninsula), Indonesian archipelago (including Borneo, Java, Kangean, Bali, Lombok, Bawean, Sumba, Sumbawa) and the Philippines.

In India, this skipper is found in the Western Ghats including the Nilgiris, Kodagu, Kanara, and the Himalayas, from Shimla eastward to Northeast India and onto Myanmar (recorded in the Karens and Dawnas). Also found in Andaman and Nicobar Islands.

The type locality for this species is the region of Bengal.

== Status ==
William Harry Evans (1932) records the orange-tail awl as rare in India and very rare in the Andaman islands. He records the butterfly as not rare in south Myanmar, the Malay Peninsula and parts of the Indonesian archipelago.

== Description ==
Both sexes: The butterfly has a wingspan of 45 to 50 mm. Above, both sexes are an unblemished dark brown. The hindwings have an orange fringe. The abdomen is orange towards the rear. Below, the wings have white patches; the forewings having a large white central patch, and the hindwings having a broad pure white discal band.

The male has no brands.

=== Detailed description ===
Edward Yerbury Watson (1891) gives a detailed description as follows:

Male. Upperside dark chocolate brown. Cilia of hindwing carmine-red. Underside maroon brown; forewing with a large buff-white patch from the middle of posterior margin, bordered above with purple; hindwing with a broad transverse purple white band terminating before the anal angle, the inner border of which is sharply defined, the outer suffusing itself on the disk. Cilia carmine-red. Palpi and thorax in front, beneath and anal tuft dull yellow. Thorax beneath greyish brown.

The female is described by Mr. Moore in his "Lepidoptera of Ceylon" as not differing from the male.

== Taxonomy ==
The skipper has the following subspecies:

- B. sena sena (Moore, 1865) - Type locality: Bengal. Distribution: Sri Lanka, S.India - Burma, Thailand, Laos, Hainan, Andamans.
- B. sena uniformis Elwes & Edwards 1897 - Type locality: Java. Distribution: Burma, Thailand, Malay Peninsula, Borneo, Java, Kangean, Bali, Lombok, Bawean, Sumba, Sumbawa.
- B. sena palawan (Staudinger, 1889) - Type locality: Palawan. Distribution: Calamian Islands, Cebu, Homonhon, Leyte, Luzon, Marinduque, Mindanao, Negros, Palawan, Panay, Polillo, Sibutu, Sibuyan, Tawitawi.

== Habits ==
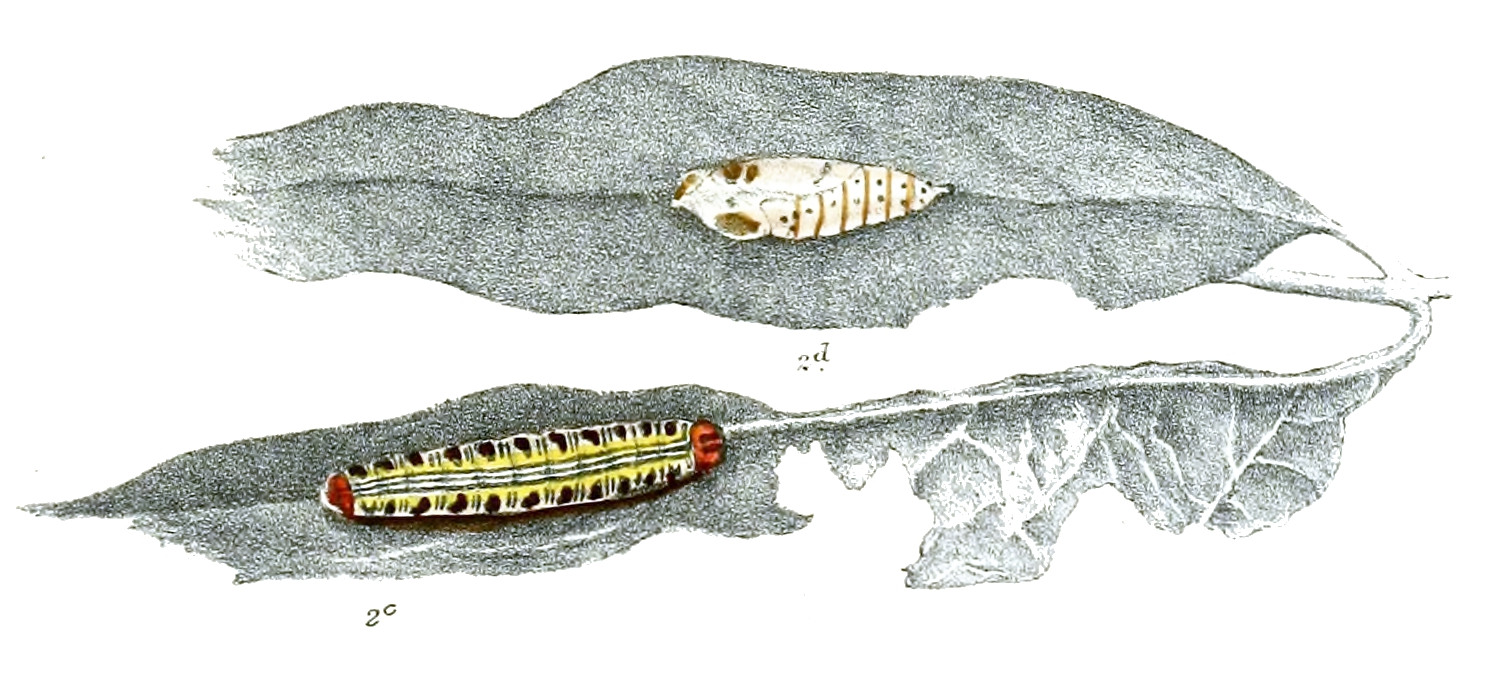
Larva and pupa

This butterfly is diurnal. It is confined to heavy jungle of low elevations, typically up to 4,000 to 5,000 feet (1,200 to 1,500 m). The male can be seen in the early mornings, basking on the top of leaves in forest glades and hilltops, chasing off intruders. The typical resting position of the orange-tail awl is the underside of the leaf. He does not mud-puddle or visit flowers. The female is usually found close to the host plants.

== Life history ==
The larva has been recorded on Combretum latifolium and Combretum extensum in Kanara. In the Andamans the larvae has been recorded on Hiptage benghalensis (Malpighiaceae).
