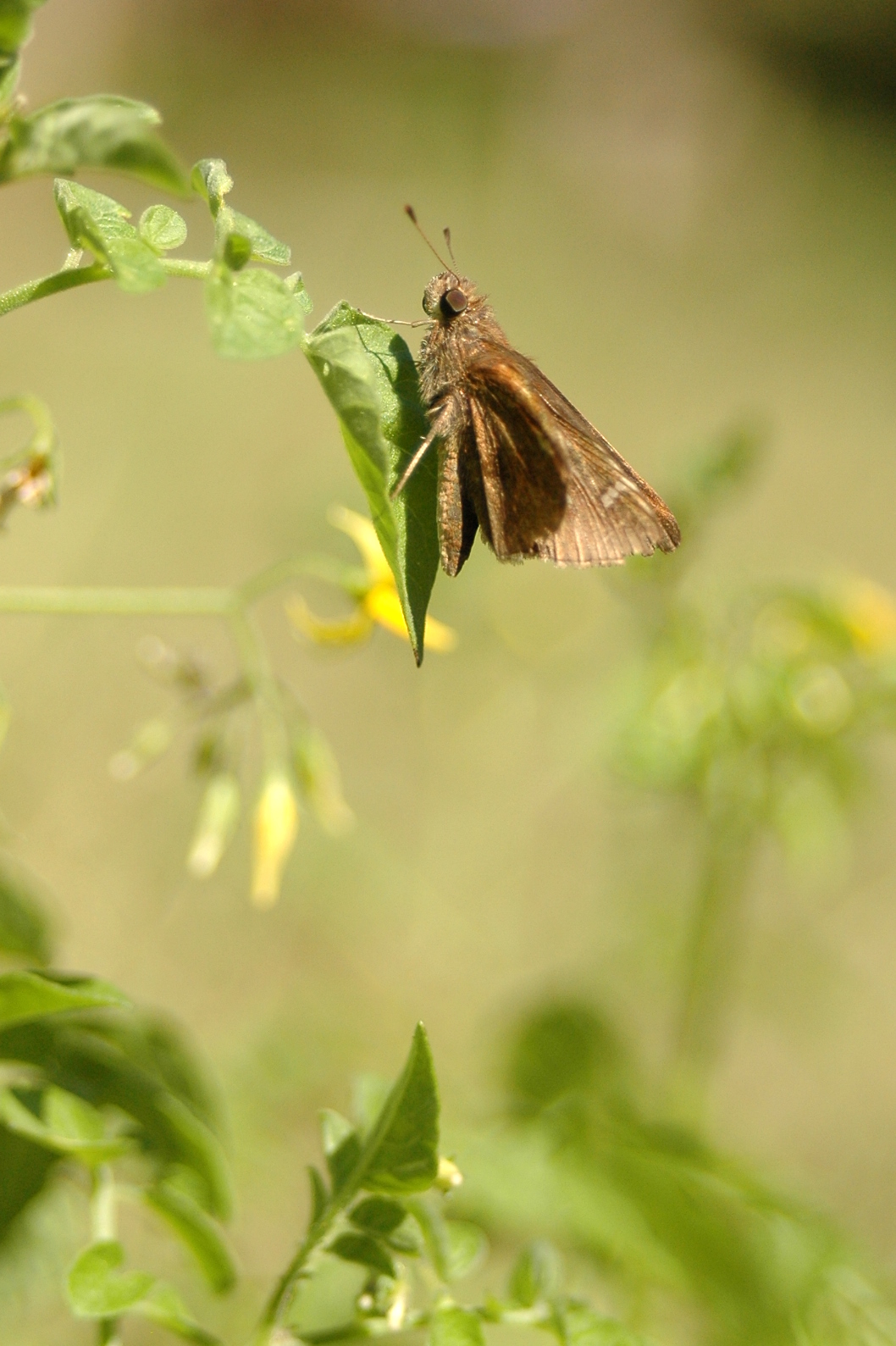
- In Hephzibah, Georgia

Conservation status
- Secure (NatureServe)

Scientific classification
- Kingdom: Animalia
- Phylum: Arthropoda
- Class: Insecta
- Order: Lepidoptera
- Family: Hesperiidae
- Genus: Lerema
- Species: L. accius

Binomial name
- Lerema accius (Smith, 1797)

Synonyms
- List: Papilio accius Smith, 1797; Hesperia monoco Scudder, 1863; Hesperia punctella Grote & Robinson, 1867; Hesperia nortonii Edwards, 1867; Goniloba parumpunctata Herrich-Schäffer, 1869; Hesperia phocylides Plötz, 1882; Papilio curtius (Scudder, 1889) (nom. nud.); Hesperia chamis (Scudder, 1889) (nom. nud.); Hesperia dido Plötz, 1882; Lerema lochius

= Lerema accius =

Species of butterfly

Lerema accius, the clouded skipper, is a butterfly of the family Hesperiidae. It is found in the United States from Georgia west to Texas, south to Florida, and south through Mexico and Central America to Venezuela and Colombia.

The wingspan is 32–45 mm. Adults are on wing year round in Florida and southern Texas.

The larvae feed on various grasses including Saccharum giganteum, Stenotaphrum secundatum, Erianthus alopecturoides and Echinochloa povietianum. Adults feed on the nectar of various pink, purple, or white flowers, including shepherd's needle, selfheal, vervain, buttonbush and lantana.

== Subspecies ==
- Lerema accius accius
- Lerema accius lochius (Venezuela)

== Photos ==
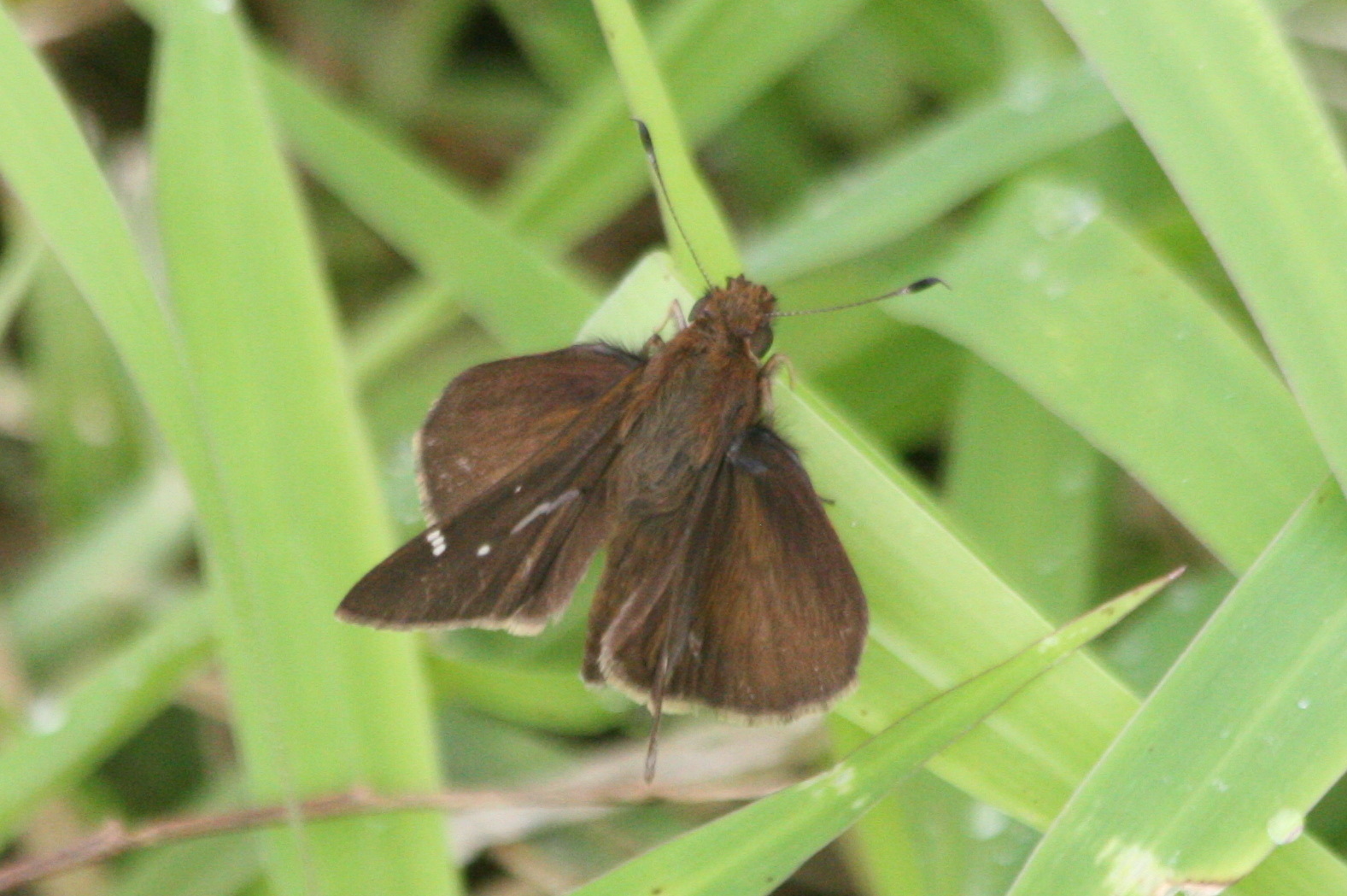

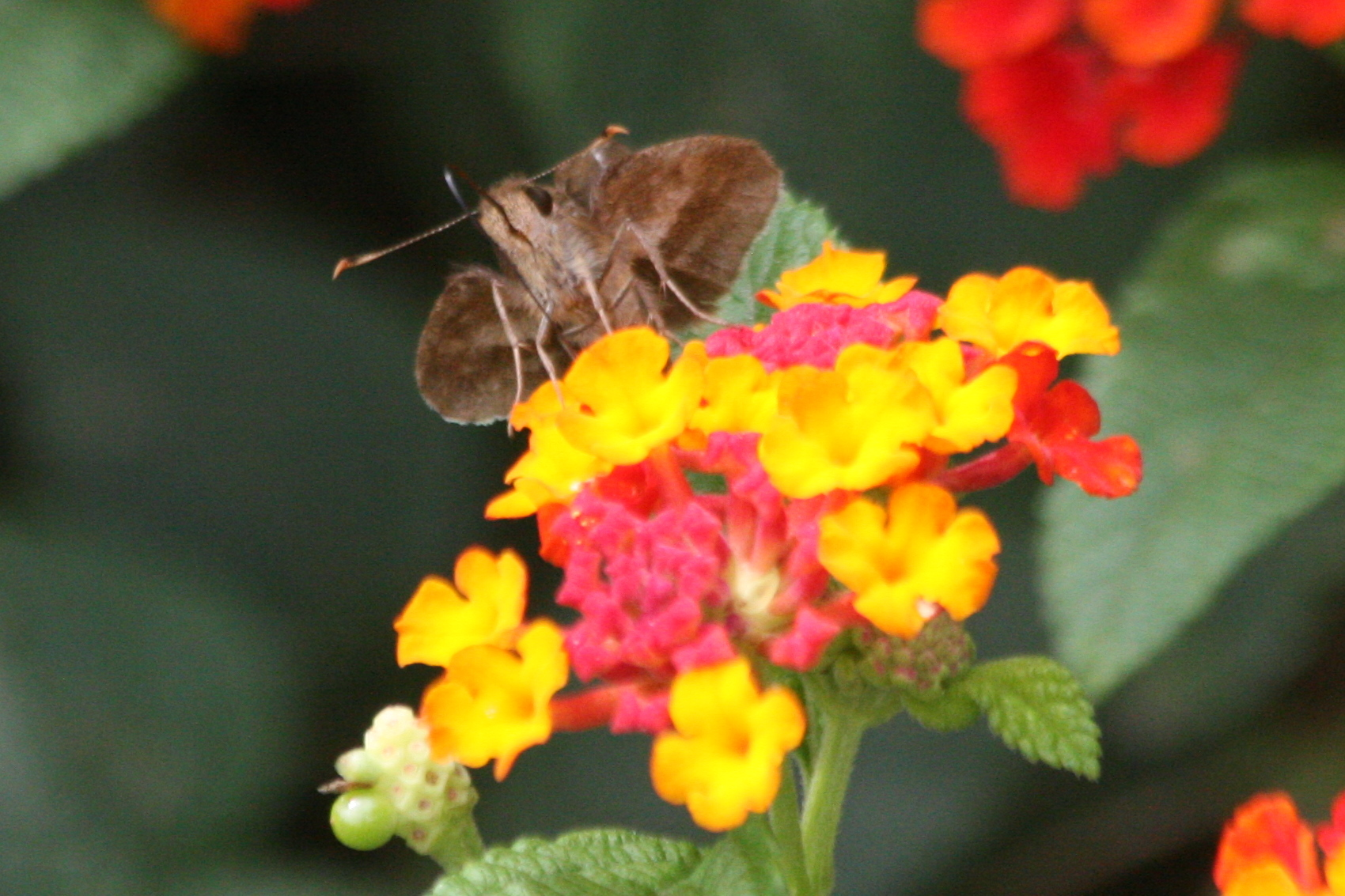
Ventral view

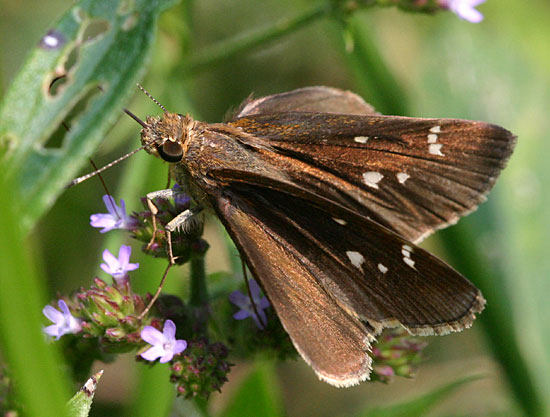
