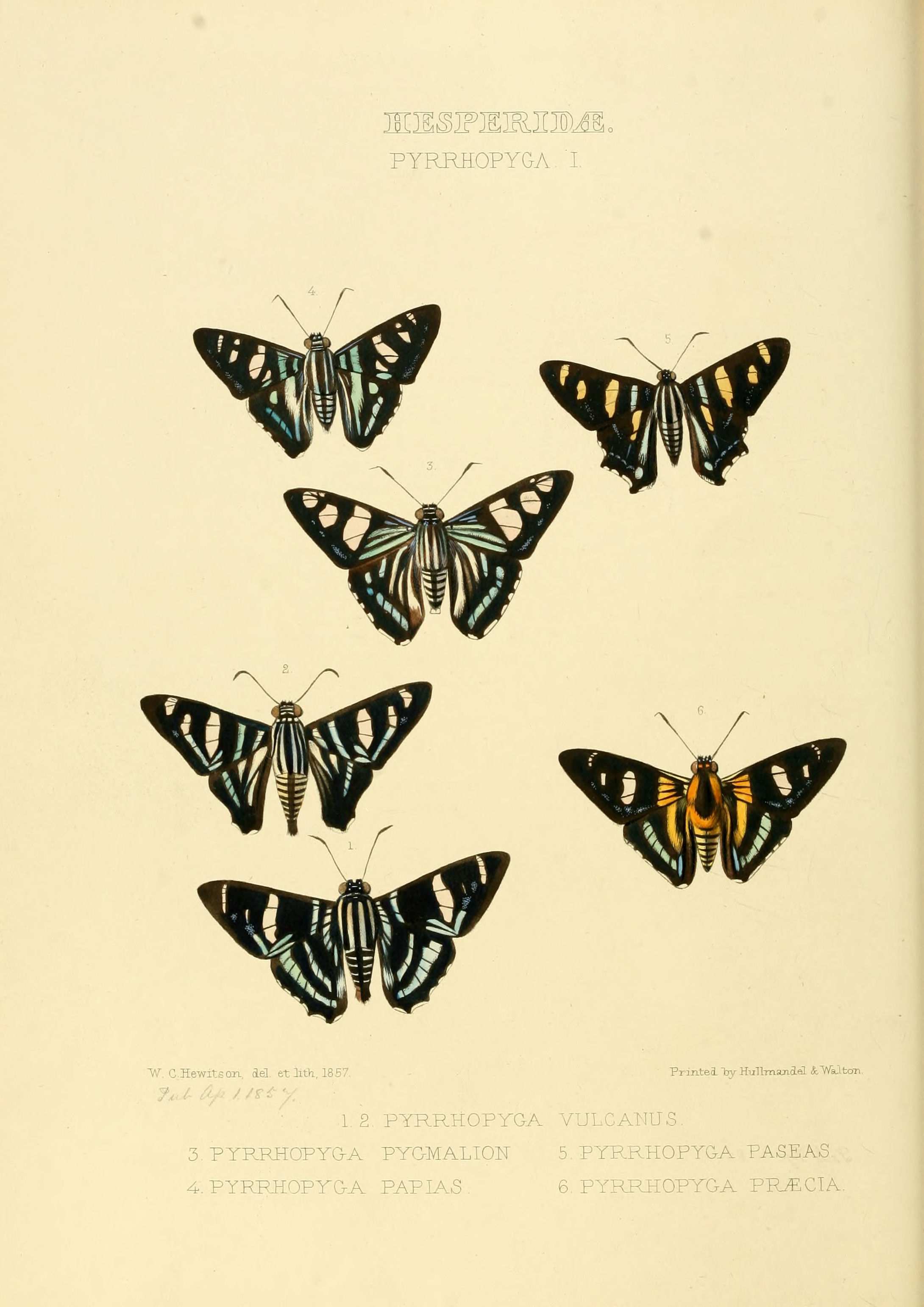
- Granila paseas figure 5

Scientific classification
- Kingdom: Animalia
- Phylum: Arthropoda
- Class: Insecta
- Order: Lepidoptera
- Family: Hesperiidae
- Genus: Granila; Mabille, 1903
- Species: G. paseas

Binomial name
- Granila paseas (Hewitson, 1857)

= Granila =

Genus of butterflies

Granila is a Neotropical genus of firetips in the family Hesperiidae.

Granila is a monotypic genus containing only Granila paseas.
