= Zenis =

Scientific classification
- Kingdom: Animalia
- Phylum: Arthropoda
- Class: Insecta
- Order: Lepidoptera
- Family: Hesperiidae
- Subtribe: Calpodina
- Genus: Zenis; Godman, 1900

Genus of butterflies

Zenis is a genus of skippers in the family Hesperiidae.

== Species ==
- Zenis jebus (Plötz, 1882)
- Zenis minos (Latreille, 1824)
