= Tamela =

Scientific classification
- Kingdom: Animalia
- Phylum: Arthropoda
- Class: Insecta
- Order: Lepidoptera
- Family: Hesperiidae
- Tribe: Notocryptini
- Genus: Tamela; Swinhoe, [1913]

Genus of butterflies

Tamela is a genus of skippers in the family Hesperiidae.
