= Nyctus =

Scientific classification
- Kingdom: Animalia
- Phylum: Arthropoda
- Class: Insecta
- Order: Lepidoptera
- Family: Hesperiidae
- Subtribe: Carystina
- Genus: Nyctus; Mabille, 1891

Genus of butterflies

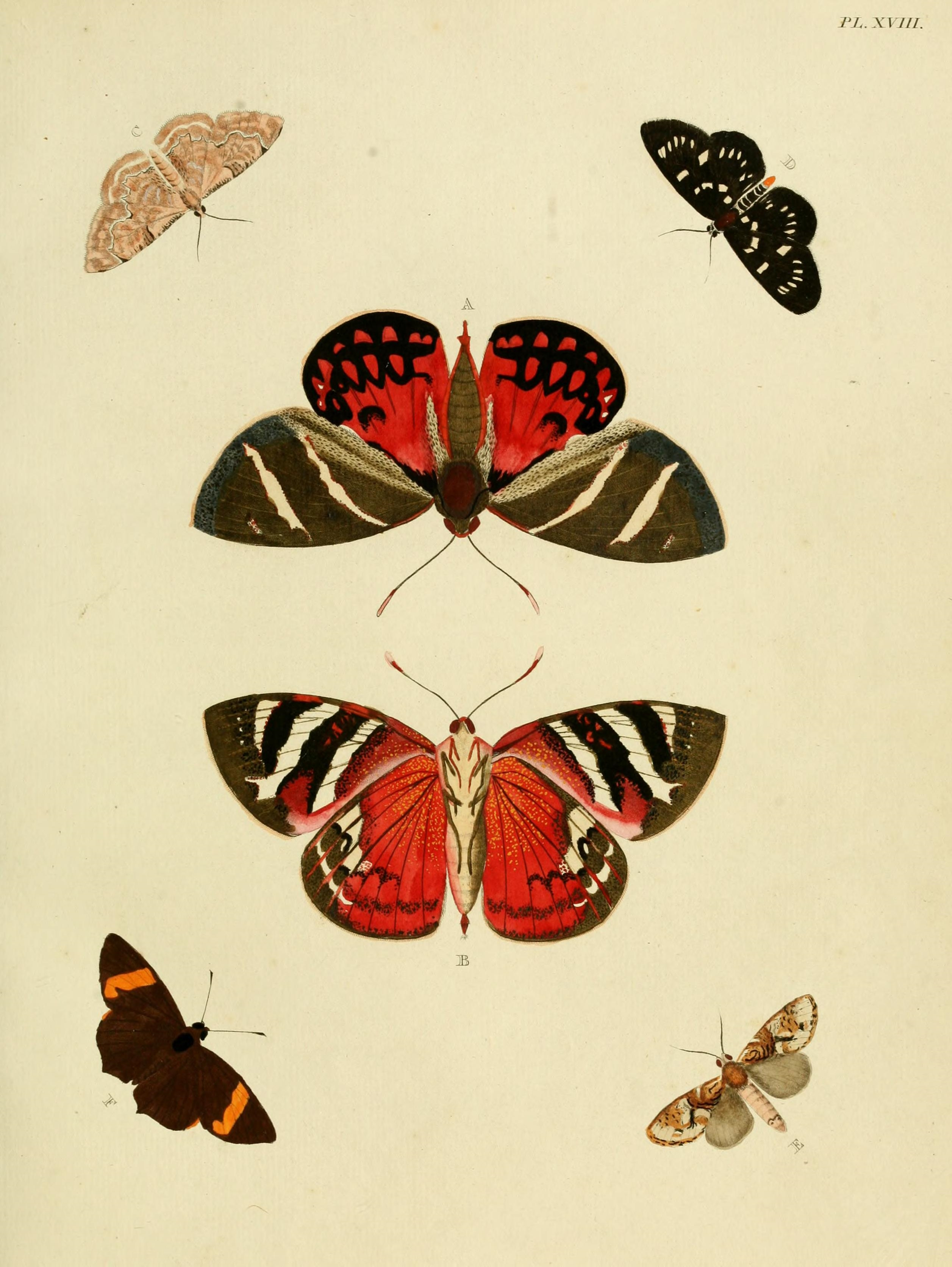
Nyctus hiarbas (F)

Nyctus is a genus of skippers in the family Hesperiidae.

== Species ==
The following species are recognised in the genus Nyctus:

- Nyctus crinitus Mabille, 1891
- Nyctus hiarbas (Cramer, 1775)
