= Cornuphallus =

Scientific classification
- Kingdom: Animalia
- Phylum: Arthropoda
- Class: Insecta
- Order: Lepidoptera
- Family: Hesperiidae
- Tribe: Pyrgini
- Genus: Cornuphallus; Austin, 1997

Genus of butterflies

Cornuphallus is a genus of skippers in the family Hesperiidae.

== Species ==
Recognised species in the genus Cornuphallus include:

- Cornuphallus onoribo (Möschler, 1883)
