= Gogyra =

Scientific classification
- Kingdom: Animalia
- Phylum: Arthropoda
- Class: Insecta
- Order: Lepidoptera
- Family: Hesperiidae
- Tribe: Erionotini
- Genus: Gogyra

Genus of butterflies

Gogyra is a genus of skippers in the family Hesperiidae.
