= Sancus (skipper) =

Scientific classification
- Kingdom: Animalia
- Phylum: Arthropoda
- Class: Insecta
- Order: Lepidoptera
- Family: Hesperiidae
- Genus: Sancus de Nicéville, 1891

Genus of butterflies

Sancus is a genus of skippers in the family Hesperiidae. The name is considered a junior synonym of the monotypic genus Psolos Staudinger, 1889 non Semper, 1892 nec Watson, 1893.
