= Neospialia =

Scientific classification
- Kingdom: Animalia
- Phylum: Arthropoda
- Class: Insecta
- Order: Lepidoptera
- Family: Hesperiidae
- Genus: Neospialia

Genus of butterflies

Neospialia is a genus of skippers in the family Hesperiidae.
