= Cyanopyge =

Scientific classification
- Kingdom: Animalia
- Phylum: Arthropoda
- Class: Insecta
- Order: Lepidoptera
- Family: Hesperiidae
- Genus: Cyanopyge

Genus of butterflies

Cyanopyge is a genus of skippers in the family Hesperiidae. It was described by Mielke in 2001.
