= List of hesperiid genera: F =

The large Lepidoptera family Hesperiidae (skippers) contains the following genera:

A B C D E F G H I J K L M N O P Q R S T U V W X Y Z

- Falga
- Favria
- Felicena
- Flaccilla
- Freemaniana
- Fresna
- Fulda
