= List of hesperiid genera: R =

The large Lepidoptera family Hesperiidae (skippers) contains the following genera:

A B C D E F G H I J K L M N O P Q R S T U V W X Y Z

- Rachelia
- Racta
- Radiatus
- Remella
- Repens
- Rhabdomantis
- Rhinthon
- Rhomba
- Ridens
