= Cyclopides =

Scientific classification
- Kingdom: Animalia
- Phylum: Arthropoda
- Clade: Pancrustacea
- Class: Insecta
- Order: Lepidoptera
- Family: Hesperiidae
- Subfamily: Heteropterinae
- Genus: Cyclopides; Hübner, 1819

Type species
- Papilio steropes Denis & Schiffermüller, 1775

Genus of butterflies

Cyclopides is a genus of skippers. It is mentioned in the Sherlock Holmes book The Hound of the Baskervilles by Sir Arthur Conan Doyle.
