= Bibla =

Scientific classification
- Kingdom: Animalia
- Phylum: Arthropoda
- Class: Insecta
- Order: Lepidoptera
- Family: Hesperiidae
- Tribe: Taractrocerini
- Genus: Bibla; Mabille, 1903

Genus of butterflies

Bibla is a genus of skippers in the family Hesperiidae.
