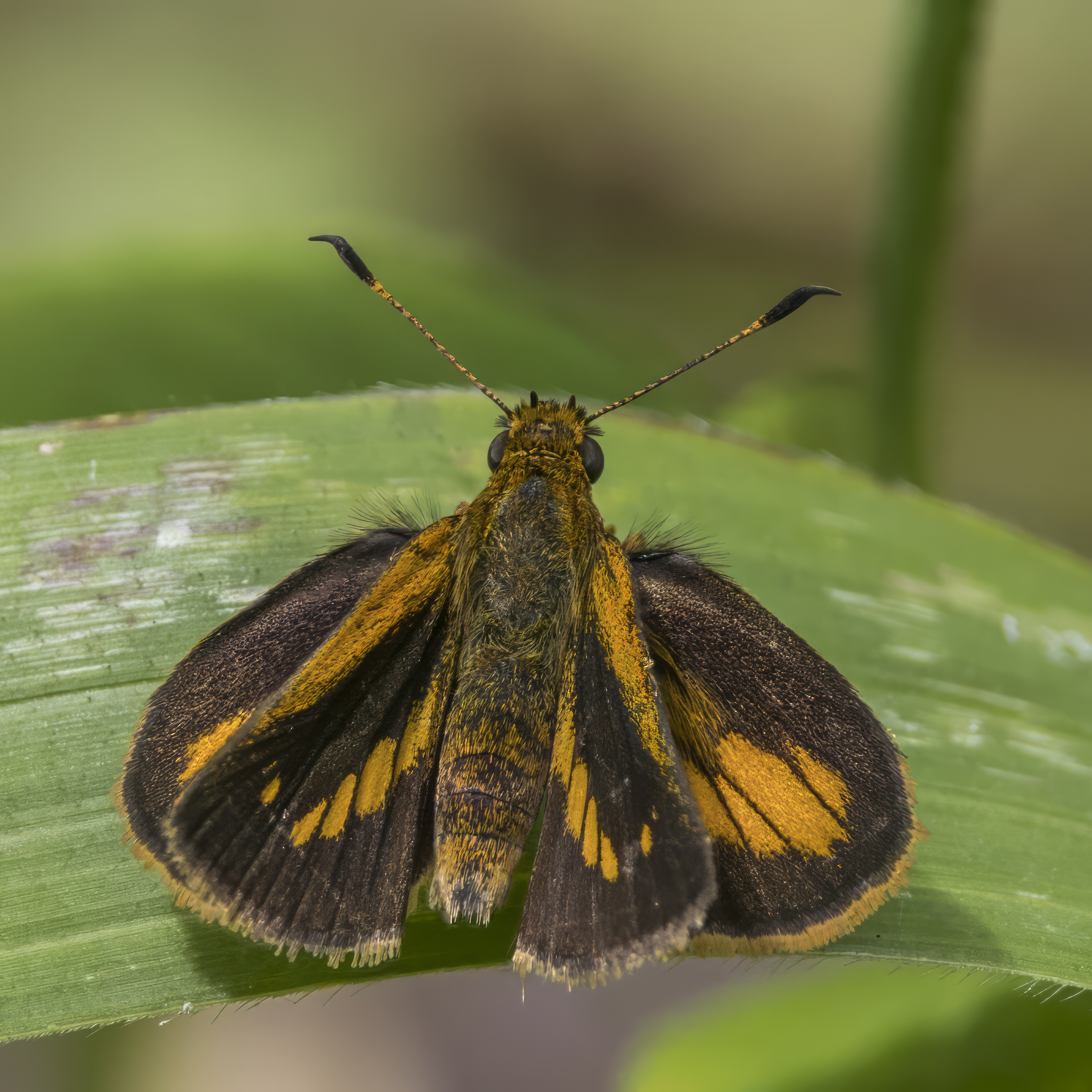
- Male in Colombia

Scientific classification
- Kingdom: Animalia
- Phylum: Arthropoda
- Class: Insecta
- Order: Lepidoptera
- Family: Hesperiidae
- Subfamily: Hesperiinae
- Tribe: Hesperiini
- Subtribe: Anthoptina
- Genus: Anthoptus; E. Bell, 1942

= Anthoptus =

Genus of butterflies

Anthoptus is a genus of skippers in the family Hesperiidae.

== Species ==
Recognised species in the genus Anthoptus include:

- Anthoptus epictetus (Fabricius, 1793)
- Anthoptus inculta (Dyar, 1918)
- Anthoptus insignis Plötz, 1882
