= Mnaseas (skipper) =

Scientific classification
- Kingdom: Animalia
- Phylum: Arthropoda
- Class: Insecta
- Order: Lepidoptera
- Family: Hesperiidae
- Subtribe: Anthoptina
- Genus: Mnaseas; Godman, 1901

Synonyms
- Arotis Mabille, 1904

Genus of butterflies

Mnaseas is a genus of skipper butterflies in the family Hesperiidae.

== Species ==
Recognised species in the genus Mnaseas include:

- Mnaseas bicolor (Mabille, 1889)
- Mnaseas bryna (Evans, 1955)
- Mnaseas derasa (Herrich-Schäffer, 1870)
- Mnaseas evansi (Mielke, 1972)
- Mnaseas inca Bell, 1930
- Mnaseas kayei Bell, [1932]
- Mnaseas macia Evans, [1955]
- Mnaseas mapirica Bell, 1930
- Mnaseas pandora Lindsey, 1925
- Mnaseas sirene Mabille, 1904
