= List of hesperiid genera: V =

The large Lepidoptera family Hesperiidae (skippers) contains the following genera:

A B C D E F G H I J K L M N O P Q R S T U V W X Y Z

- Vacerra
- Vehilius
- Venada
- Venas
- Vertica
- Vettius
- Vidius
- Vinius
- Vinpeius
- Viola
- Virga
- Vistigma
- Vorates
