= List of hesperiid genera: I =

The large Lepidoptera family Hesperiidae (skippers) contains the following genera:

A B C D E F G H I J K L M N O P Q R S T U V W X Y Z

- Iambrix
- Idmon
- Igapophilus
- Iliana
- Ilma
- Inessa
- Inglorius
- Isma
- Isoteinon
- Iton
