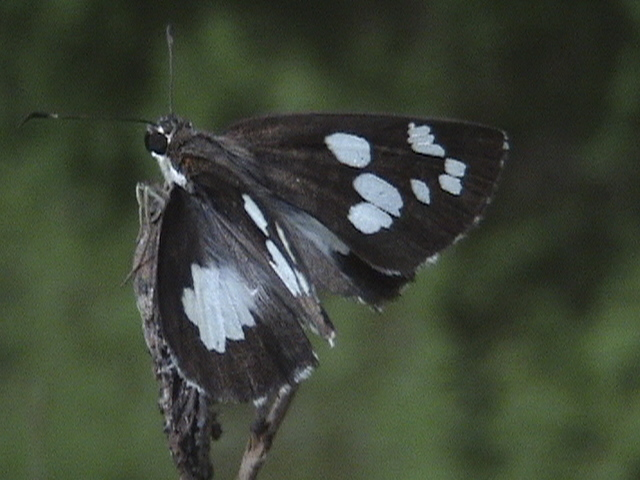
- Grass demon (Udaspes folus)

Scientific classification
- Domain: Eukaryota
- Kingdom: Animalia
- Phylum: Arthropoda
- Class: Insecta
- Order: Lepidoptera
- Family: Hesperiidae
- Subfamily: Hesperiinae
- Tribe: Ancistroidini

Genera
- Ancistroides; Iambrix; Idmon; Koruthaialos; Notocrypta

= Ancistroidini =

Tribe of butterflies

The Ancistroidini are a tribe in the Hesperiinae subfamily of skipper butterflies. They are often blackish in base color; several of the genera contain the species commonly called "demon butterflies" or "demon skippers". As most Hesperiinae have not yet been assigned to tribes, more genera are likely to be placed into this presently rather small group eventually.
