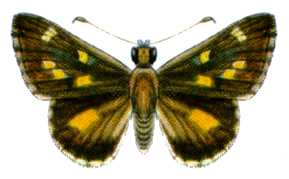

Scientific classification
- Kingdom: Animalia
- Phylum: Arthropoda
- Class: Insecta
- Order: Lepidoptera
- Family: Hesperiidae
- Genus: Anisyntoides

= Anisyntoides =

Genus of butterflies

Anisyntoides is a genus of skipper butterflies in the family Hesperiidae.
