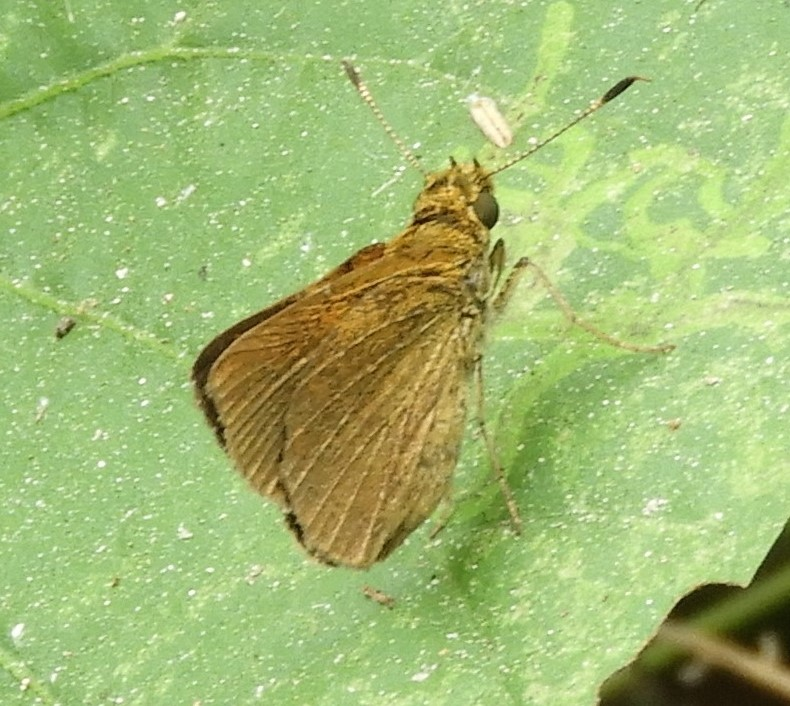
- Corticea corticea

Scientific classification
- Kingdom: Animalia
- Phylum: Arthropoda
- Class: Insecta
- Order: Lepidoptera
- Family: Hesperiidae
- Subtribe: Anthoptina
- Genus: Corticea; Evans, [1955]

= Corticea =

Genus of butterflies

Corticea is a genus of skippers in the family Hesperiidae.

== Species ==
Recognised species in the genus Corticea include:

- Corticea corticea (Plötz, 1883)
- Corticea graziellae (E. Bell, 1959)
- Corticea lysias Plötz, 1883
- Corticea mendica (Mabille, 1897)
- Corticea schwarzi (E. Bell, 1941)
- Corticea similea (E. Bell, 1941)
- Corticea sylva (E. Bell, 1942)
- Corticea vicinus (Plötz, 1884)
