= Yvretta =

Scientific classification
- Kingdom: Animalia
- Phylum: Arthropoda
- Class: Insecta
- Order: Lepidoptera
- Family: Hesperiidae
- Tribe: Hesperiini
- Genus: Yvretta

Genus of butterflies

Yvretta is a genus of skippers in the family Hesperiidae.
