= Dicrosema =

Scientific classification
- Kingdom: Animalia
- Phylum: Arthropoda
- Class: Insecta
- Order: Lepidoptera
- Family: Hesperiidae
- Genus: Dicrosema

Genus of butterflies

Dicrosema is a genus of skippers in the family Hesperiidae.

== Species ==
- Dicrosema quadrifenestrata Bryk, 1953 (Anisochoria quadrifenestrata), eastern Brazil
