= Sepa (skipper) =

Scientific classification
- Kingdom: Animalia
- Phylum: Arthropoda
- Class: Insecta
- Order: Lepidoptera
- Family: Hesperiidae
- Genus: Sepa

Genus of butterflies

Sepa is a genus of skippers that lives in the family Hesperiidae.
