= Metrocles (skipper) =

Scientific classification
- Kingdom: Animalia
- Phylum: Arthropoda
- Class: Insecta
- Order: Lepidoptera
- Family: Hesperiidae
- Subfamily: Hesperiinae
- Genus: Metrocles; Godman, 1900

Synonyms
- Chalcone Evans, 1955; Hansa Evans, 1955; Propertius Evans, 1955

Genus of butterflies

Metrocles is a genus of skippers in the family Hesperiidae.

== Species ==
Recognised species in the genus Metrocles include:

- Metrocles argentea (Weeks, 1901)
- Metrocles briquenydan (Weeks, 1901)
- Metrocles devergens (Draudt, 1923)
- Metrocles hyboma (Plötz, 1886)
- Metrocles leucogaster Godman, 1900
- Metrocles propertius Fabricius, 1793
- Metrocles santarus (Bell, 1940)
- Metrocles schrottkyi (Giacomelli, 1911)
- Metrocles scitula (Hayward, 1951)
- Metrocles zisa (Plötz, 1882)
