= Xeniades (butterfly) =

Scientific classification
- Kingdom: Animalia
- Phylum: Arthropoda
- Class: Insecta
- Order: Lepidoptera
- Family: Hesperiidae
- Tribe: Hesperiini
- Genus: Xeniades; Godman, 1900

Genus of butterflies

Xeniades is a genus of skippers in the family Hesperiidae.

== Species ==
Recognised species in the genus Xeniades include:

- Xeniades chalestra Hewitson, 1866
- Xeniades difficilis Draudt, [1924]
- Xeniades hermoda (Hewitson, 1870)
- Xeniades laureatus (Draudt, 1924)
- Xeniades orchamus (Cramer, 1777)
- Xeniades pteras Godman, 1900
- Xeniades quadrata (Herrich-Schäffer, 1869)
- Xeniades pteras (Hewitson, 1870)
- Xeniades putumayo (Constantino and Salazar, 2013)
- Xeniades rinda (Evans, 1955)
- Xeniades victoria Evans, [1955]
