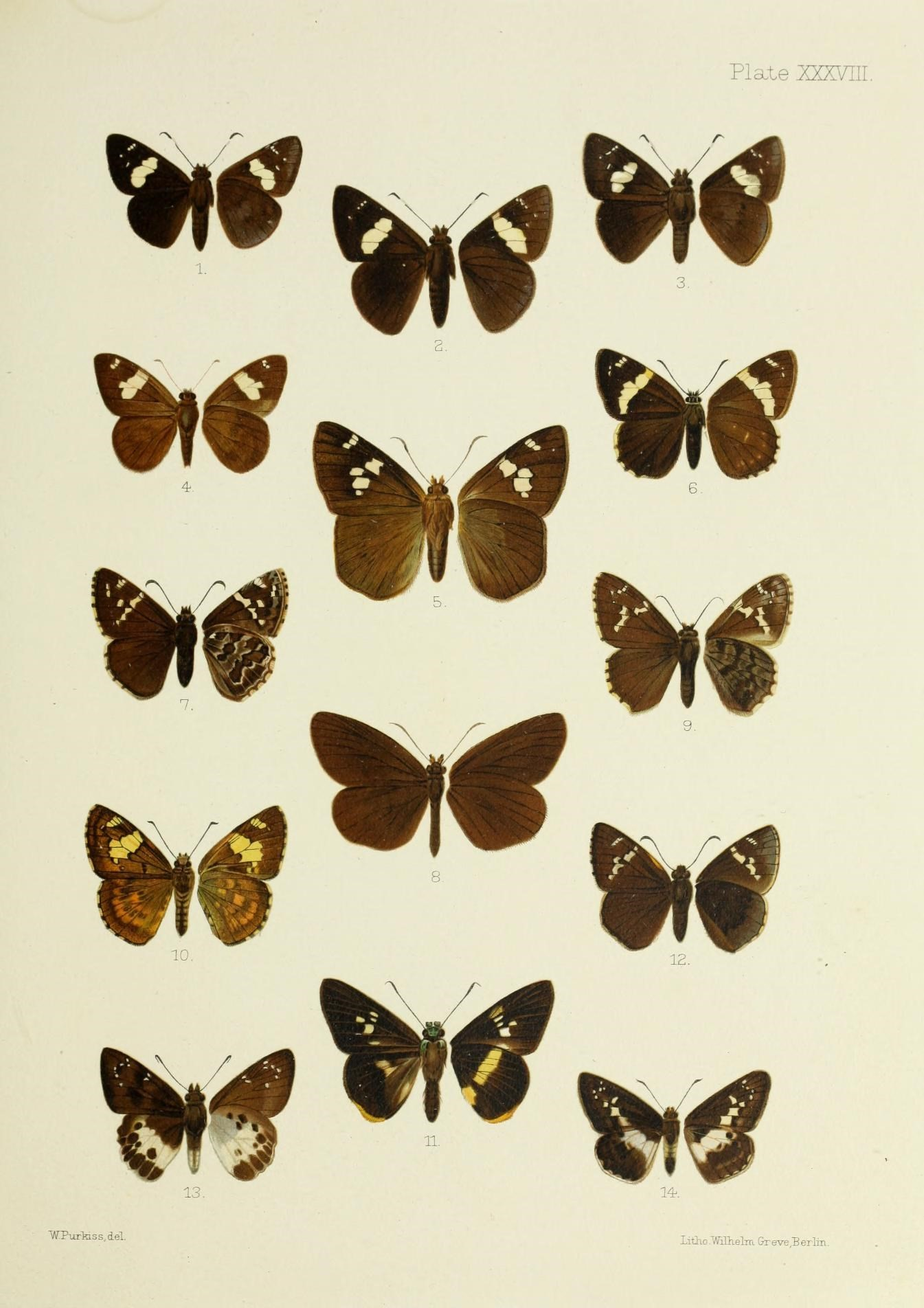
- Apostictopterus fuliginosus male in Leech Butterflies from China, Japan, and Corea (figure 8)

Scientific classification
- Kingdom: Animalia
- Phylum: Arthropoda
- Clade: Pancrustacea
- Class: Insecta
- Order: Lepidoptera
- Family: Hesperiidae
- Subfamily: Heteropterinae
- Genus: Apostictopterus; Leech, [1893]
- Species: A. fuliginosus

Binomial name
- Apostictopterus fuliginosus Leech, [1893]

Synonyms
- Genus: Tecupa Swinhoe, 1917; Species: Tecupa curiosa Swinhoe, 1917

= Apostictopterus =

Apostictopterus fuliginosus

Genus of butterflies

Apostictopterus is a genus of skippers in the family Hesperiidae. It contains only one species, Apostictopterus fuliginosus, which is found in India (Assam) and West China.

== Subspecies ==
- Apostictopterus fuliginosus fuliginosus
- Apostictopterus fuliginosus curiosa (Swinhoe, 1917) (Assam)
