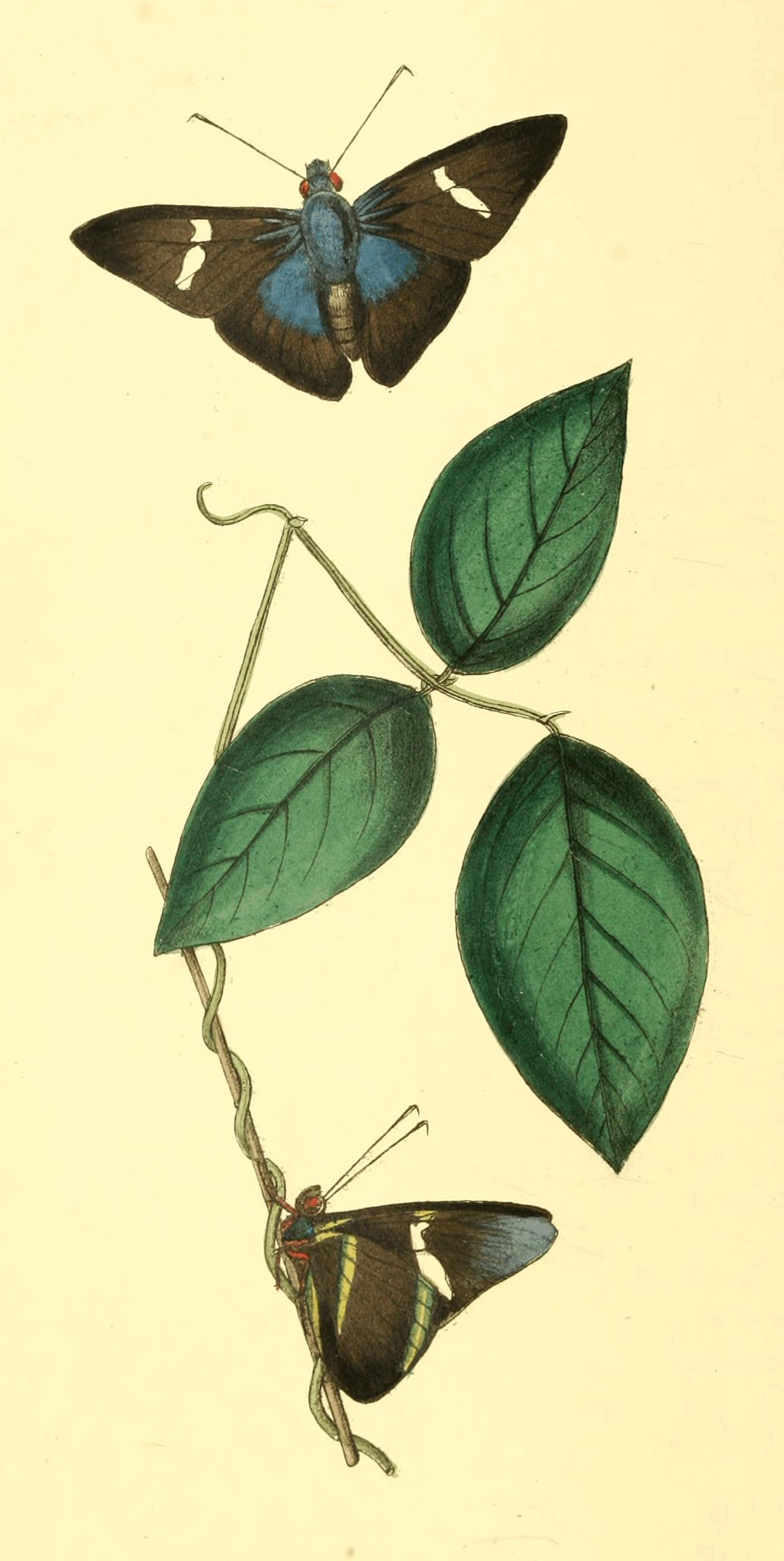
- William Swainson's original figure of Perichares haworthiana

Scientific classification
- Kingdom: Animalia
- Phylum: Arthropoda
- Class: Insecta
- Order: Lepidoptera
- Family: Hesperiidae
- Tribe: Pericharini
- Genus: Perichares; Scudder, 1872

Synonyms
- Lychnuchoides Godman, 1901; Alera Mabille, 1891; Oenides Mabille, 1904

= Perichares =

Genus of butterflies

Perichares is a Neotropical genus of skippers in the family Hesperiidae.

== Species ==
- Perichares furcata Mabille, 1891 - Brazil
- Perichares haworthiana (Swainson, 1821) – green-banded ruby-eye – Panama to south Brazil
- Perichares manu Mielke & Casagrande, 2004 - Peru, Brazil
- Perichares metallica (Riley, 1921) - Brazil
- Perichares philetes (Gmelin, [1790])
- Perichares romeroi Mielke & Casagrande, 2004 - Venezuela
- Perichares vulpina (C. & R. Felder, 1867) - Colombia
