= Zalomes =

Scientific classification
- Kingdom: Animalia
- Phylum: Arthropoda
- Class: Insecta
- Order: Lepidoptera
- Family: Hesperiidae
- Subtribe: Moncina
- Genus: Zalomes; Bell, 1947

Synonyms
- Nylla Miller, L.D. & Miller, J.Y., 1972

Genus of butterflies

Zalomes is a genus of skippers in the family Hesperiidae.

== Species ==
Recognised species in the genus Zalomes include:

- Zalomes biforis (Weymer, 1890)

=== Former species ===
- Zalomes colobus Bell, 1947 - synonymized with Hesperia biforis Weymer, 1890
