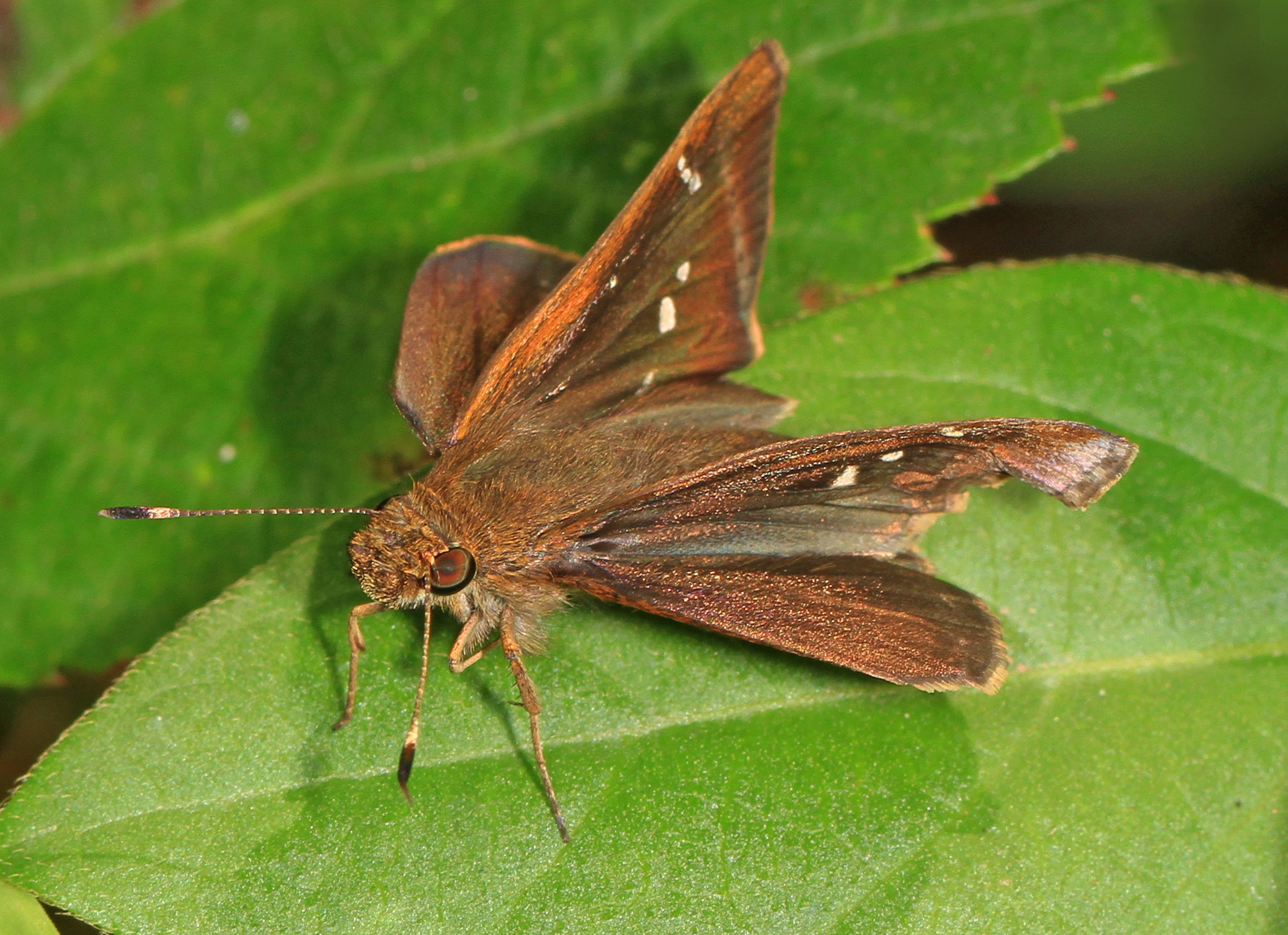
- Lerema accius

Scientific classification
- Kingdom: Animalia
- Phylum: Arthropoda
- Class: Insecta
- Order: Lepidoptera
- Family: Hesperiidae
- Subtribe: Moncina
- Genus: Lerema; Scudder, 1872

Synonyms
- Sarega Mabille, 1904

= Lerema =

Genus of butterflies

Lerema is a genus of skipper butterflies in the family Hesperiidae.

== Species ==
- Lerema accius (Smith, 1797) – clouded skipper
- Lerema ancillaris (Butler, 1877)
- Lerema ancus (Möschler, 1879)
- Lerema caraca Mielke, 1992
- Lerema duroca (Plötz, 1882)
- Lerema etelka (Schaus, 1902)
- Lerema geisa (Möschler, 1879)
- Lerema lineosa (Herrich-Schäffer, 1865)
- Lerema liris (Evans, 1955)
- Lerema lucius Grishin, 2022
- Lerema lyde (Godman, 1900)
- Lerema pattenii Scudder, 1872
- Lerema valda Evans,1955
- Lerema venias (Bell, 1942)

=== Former species ===
- Lerema bipunctata (Mabille, 1889) - synonymized with Lerema pattenii Scudder, 1872
- Lerema coyana Schaus, 1902 - transferred to Ralis coyana (Schaus, 1902)
- Lerema lochius Plötz, 1882 - transferred to Cymaenes lochius (Plötz, 1882)
- Lerema lumina (Herrich-Schäffer, 1869) - transferred to Cymaenes lumina (Herrich-Schäffer, 1869)
- Lerema micythus (Godman, 1900) - synonymized with Picova incompta (Hayward, 1942)
- Lerema veadeira Mielke, 1968 - transferred to Veadda veadeira (Mielke, 1968)
- Lerema viridis Bell, 1942 - transferred to Viridina viridis (Bell, 1942)
