= Koruthaialos =

- Koruthaialos rubecula and K. r. namata line "d"

Scientific classification
- Kingdom: Animalia
- Phylum: Arthropoda
- Clade: Pancrustacea
- Class: Insecta
- Order: Lepidoptera
- Family: Hesperiidae
- Subfamily: Hesperiinae
- Tribe: Ancistroidini
- Genus: Koruthaialos; Watson,1893

Species
- See text

Genus of butterflies

Koruthaialos is an Indomalayan genus of grass skippers in the family Hesperiidae.

== Species ==
- Koruthaialos butleri (de Nicéville, 1884) - Assam, Malaya, Vietnam, Burma, Thailand, Laos, Yunnan
- Koruthaialos focula (Plötz, 1882) - Java, Sumatra, Borneo
- Koruthaialos frena Evans, 1949
- Koruthaialos rubecula (Plötz, 1882) - Burma, Thailand, Laos, Vietnam, Yunnan, Langkawi, Malaysia, Borneo, Sumatra, Natuna, Bali, Philippines, Sumatra, Nias, Assam, Bangladesh
- Koruthaialos sindu (de Nicéville, 1884) - Assam, Burma, Thailand, Laos, Vietnam, Malaysia, Yunnan, Borneo, Sumatra, Java, Batoe, Siberut, Bali, Yunnan
- Koruthaialos swinhoei Elwes & Edwards, 1897
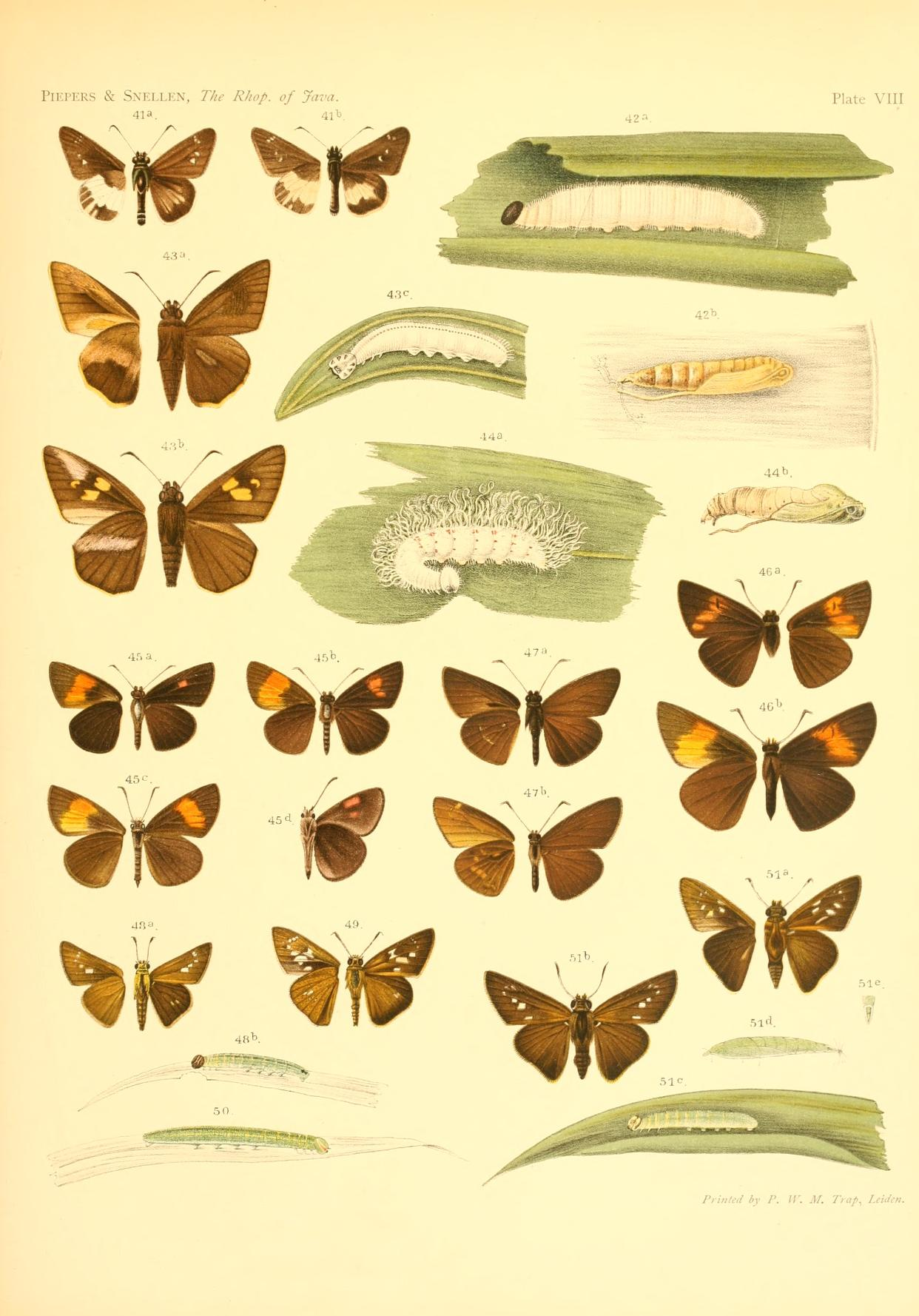
Koruthaialos sindu and Koruthaialos focula in Piepers and Snellen The Rhopalocera of Java

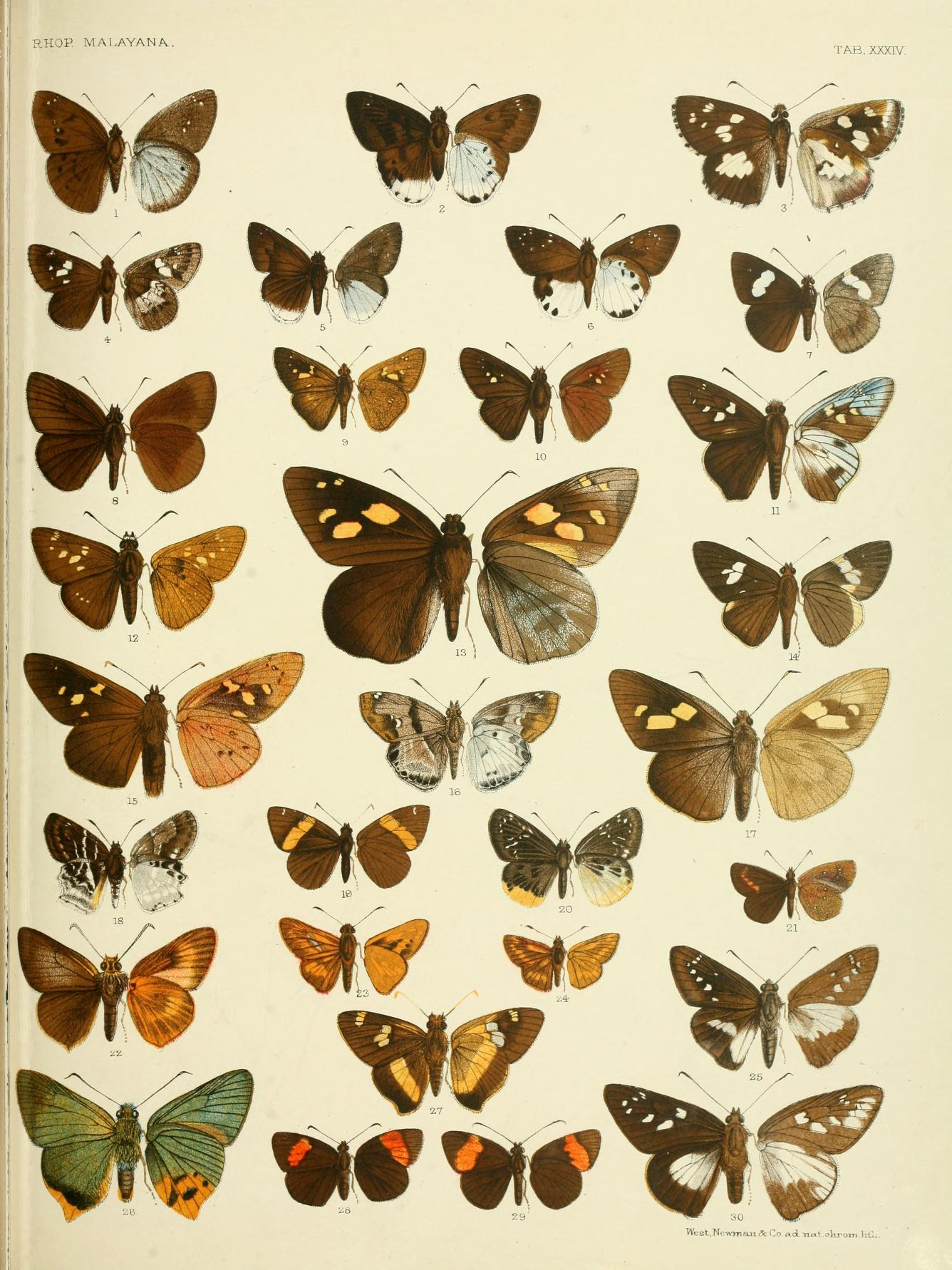
Koruthaialos sindu in Rhopalocera Malayana
