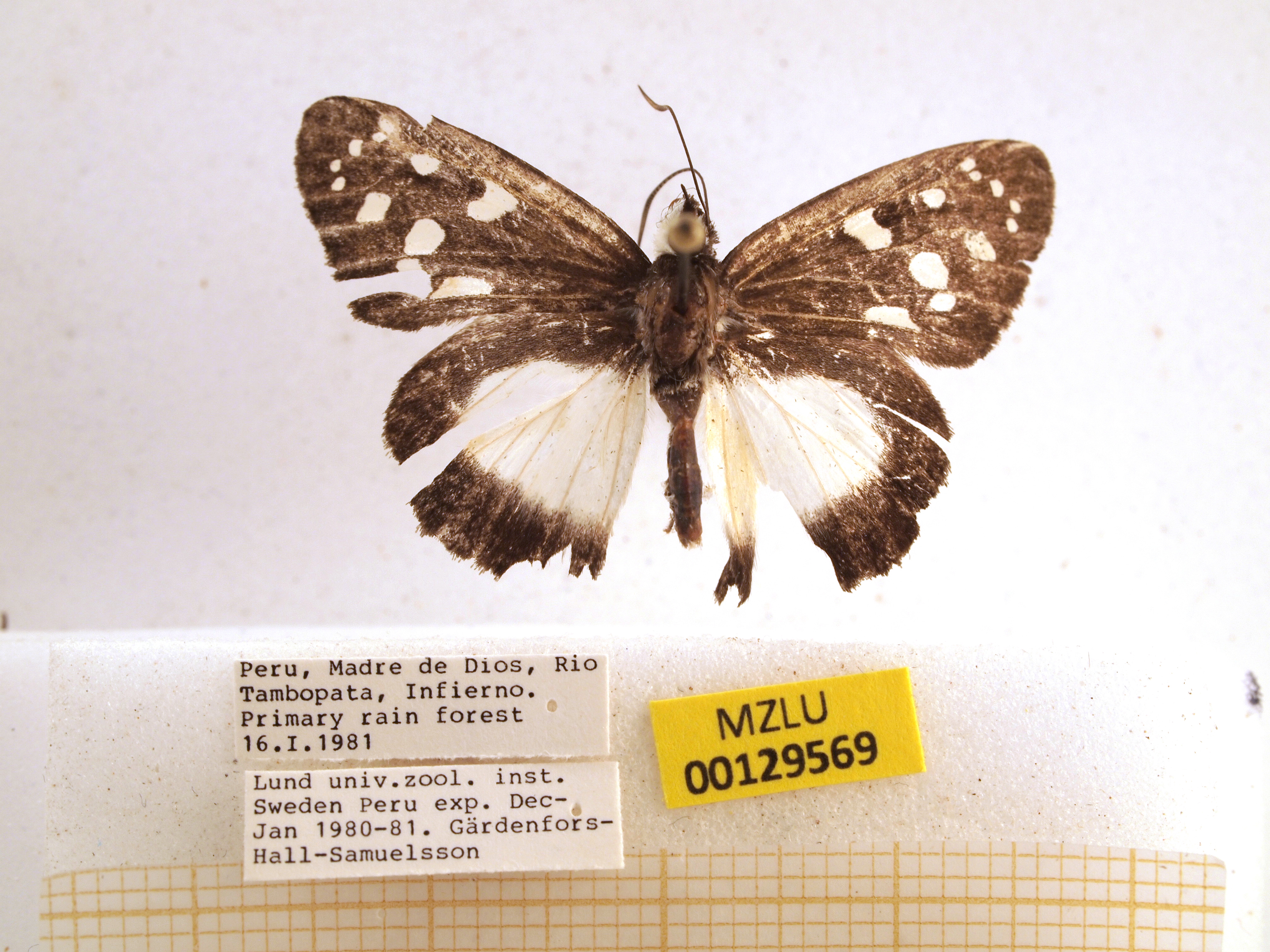
- Hyalothyrus mimicus

Scientific classification
- Kingdom: Animalia
- Phylum: Arthropoda
- Class: Insecta
- Order: Lepidoptera
- Family: Hesperiidae
- Tribe: Entheini
- Genus: Hyalothyrus; Mabille, 1878

Synonyms
- List: Lignyostola Mabille, 1888; Mionectes Mabille, 1903; Plagiothyrus Mabille & Boullet, 1919; Onzis Lindsey, 1925

= Hyalothyrus =

Genus of butterflies

Hyalothyrus is a genus of skippers in the family Hesperiidae, in which it is placed in tribe Entheini.

== Species ==
- Hyalothyrus infernalis (Moschler, 1877) French Guiana, Suriname
- Hyalothyrus infa Evans, 1952 Colombia, Brazil (Amazonas)
- Hyalothyrus leucomelas (Geyer, [1832]) Brazil (Amazonas)
- Hyalothyrus mimicus Mabille & Boullet, 1919 Peru
- Hyalothyrus neleus (Linnaeus, 1758)
  - H. neleus neleus (Linnaeus, 1758) Peru
  - H. neleus pemphigargyra (Mabille, 1888) Mexico, Panama, Colombia
- Hyalothyrus neda Evans, 1952 Bolivia
- Hyalothyrus nitocris (Stoll, [1782]) Suriname

== Habitats ==
Hyalothyrus neleus is restricted to primary rainforest at altitudes between sea level and about 800 metres.

== Lifecycle ==
H. neleus caterpillars feed on Inga ( Fabaceae ) and are a dirty greenish colour, with a series of prominent pale green spots along the sides, and a large shiny reddish brown head. The internal organs and digestive system are clearly visible through the translucent skin. There is no information about the pupa, but in common with other Pyrgine skippers it is likely to be dark and smooth, with the wing cases in a contrasting tone or colour.

== Adult behaviour ==
Adults of H. neleus are social and primarily active at dusk, or on overcast days.
