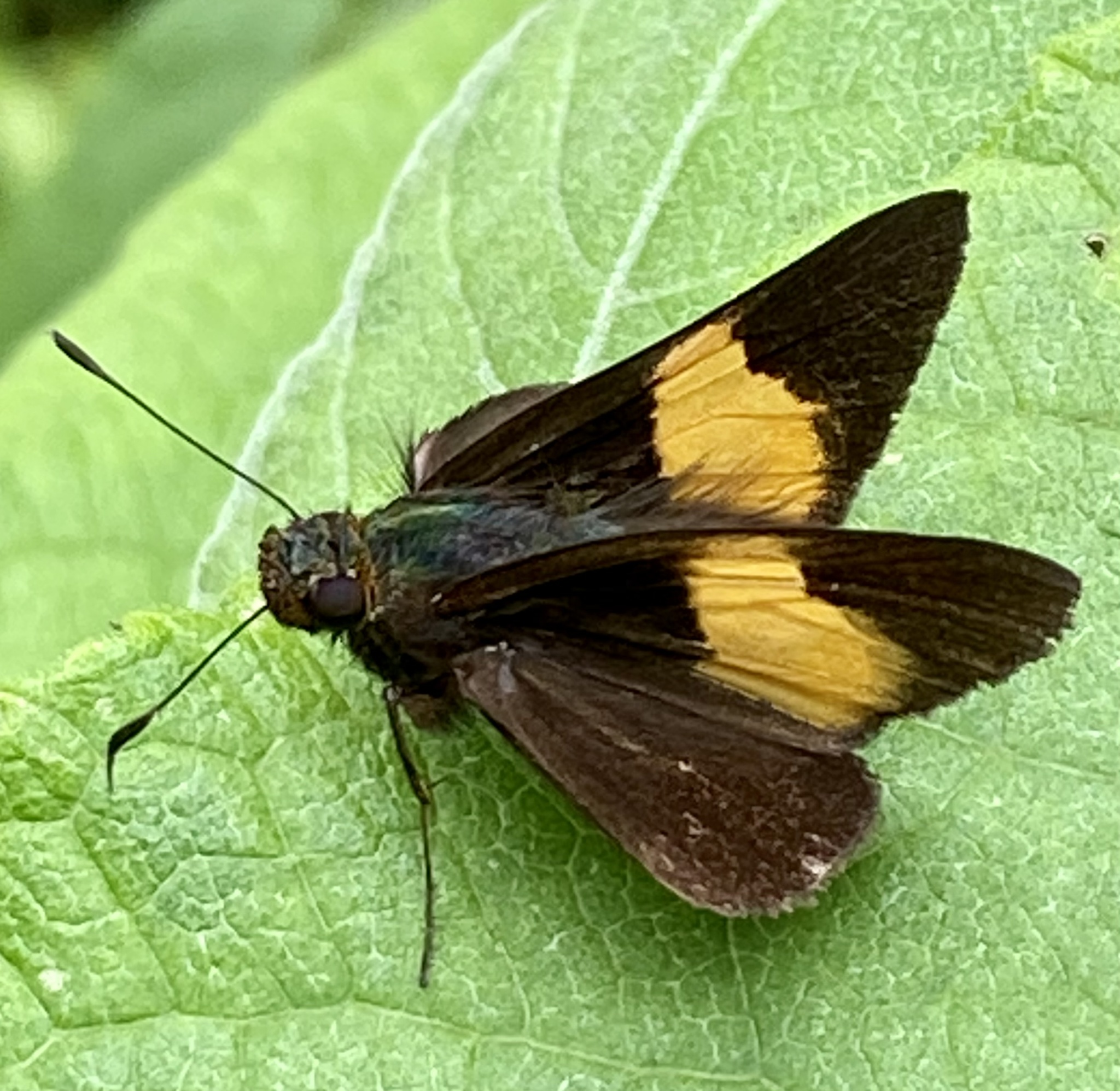
- Lychnuchus celsus

Scientific classification
- Kingdom: Animalia
- Phylum: Arthropoda
- Clade: Pancrustacea
- Class: Insecta
- Order: Lepidoptera
- Family: Hesperiidae
- Subtribe: Moncina
- Genus: Lychnuchus; Hübner, 1827

= Lychnuchus =

Genus of butterflies

Lychnuchus is a genus of skipper butterflies in the family Hesperiidae.

== Species ==
- Lychnuchus achelous Plötz, 1882 - ferruginous brown-eye
- Lychnuchus angularis Möschler, 1877
- Lychnuchus aphilos Herrich-Schäffer, 1869
- Lychnuchus blenda Evans, 1955
- Lychnuchus blotta Evans, 1955
- Lychnuchus celsus (Fabricius, 1793)
- Lychnuchus demon (Evans, 1955)
- Lychnuchus dognini Mabille, 1889
- Lychnuchus iccius Evans, 1955
- Lychnuchus immaculata Hewitson, 1868 - immaculate brown-eye
- Lychnuchus topo Nicolay, 1980
- Lychnuchus uza Hewitson, 1877

=== Former species ===
- Lychnuchus olenus Hübner, [1831] - synonymized with Hesperia celsus Fabricius, 1793
- Lychnuchus pelta Evans, 1955 - transferred to Molo pelta (Evans, 1955)
- Lychnuchus victa Evans, 1955 - transferred to Alychna victa (Evans, 1955)
