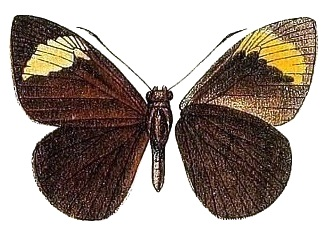
- Katreus johnstonii

Scientific classification
- Kingdom: Animalia
- Phylum: Arthropoda
- Clade: Pancrustacea
- Class: Insecta
- Order: Lepidoptera
- Family: Hesperiidae
- Tribe: Celaenorrhinini
- Genus: Katreus; Watson, 1893

Synonyms
- Choristoneura Mabille, 1890; Daratus Lindsey, 1925; Loxolexis Karsch, 1895

= Katreus =

Genus of butterflies

Katreus /ˈkeɪtriːəs/ is a genus of skippers in the family Hesperiidae.

== Species ==
The following species are recognised in the genus Katreus:

- Katreus dimidia (Holland, 1896)
- Katreus holocausta (Mabille, 1891)
- Katreus johnstonii (Butler, 1888) - giant scarce sprite

Torben Larsen developed a species numbering system for his 2005 publication Butterflies of West Africa. The species Katreus johnstonii is #1215. The 'Larsen' numbers have since been used with permission in A Sharp Eye on Butterflies of Ghana.
