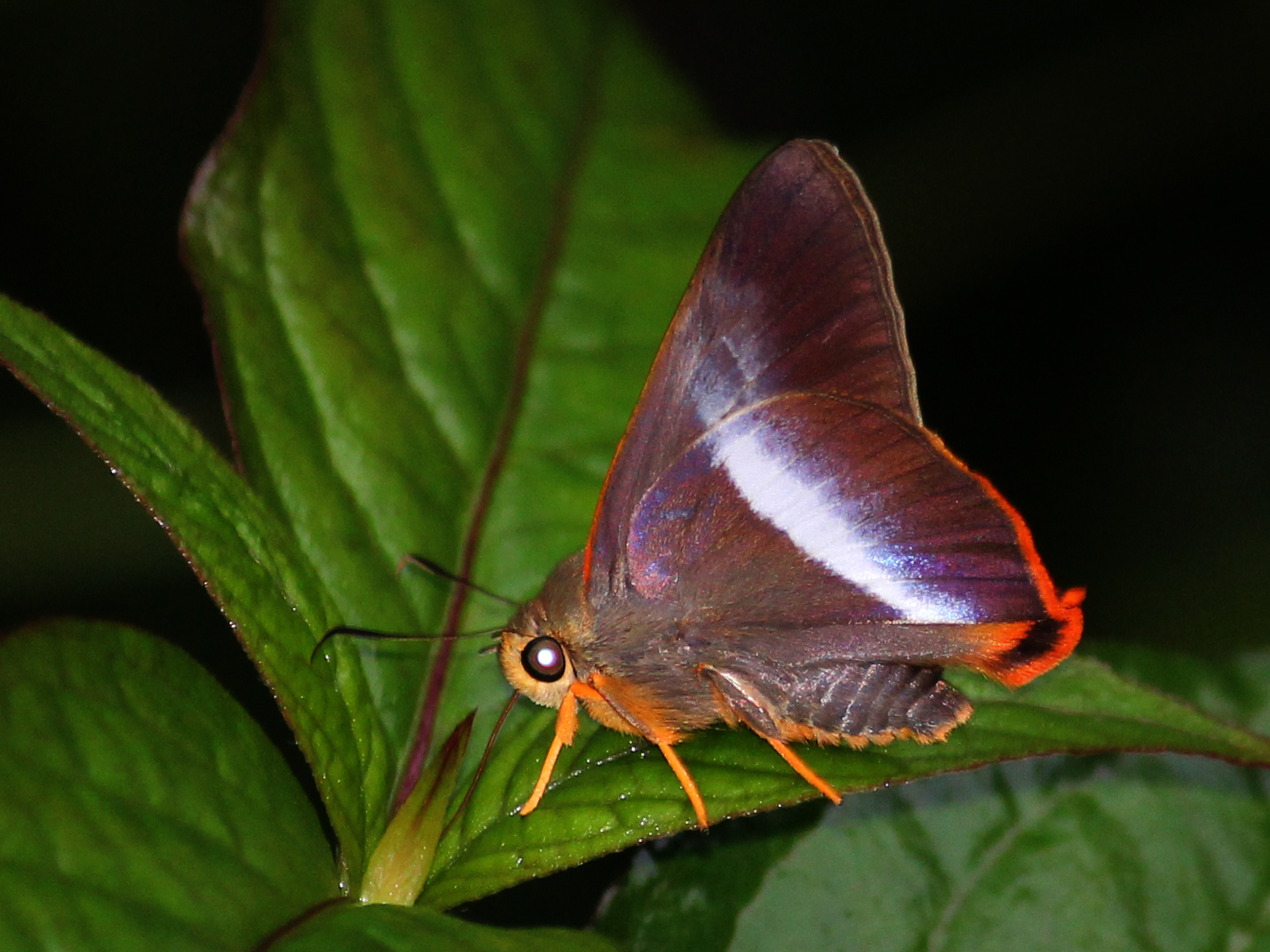
- Ventral view, B. sena

Scientific classification
- Kingdom: Animalia
- Phylum: Arthropoda
- Class: Insecta
- Order: Lepidoptera
- Family: Hesperiidae
- Subfamily: Coeliadinae
- Genus: Bibasis; Moore, [1881]

Synonyms
- Gecana Swinhoe, 1912; Pola Swinhoe, 1912; Sartora Swinhoe, 1912; Tothrix Swinhoe, 1912; Zehala Swinhoe, 1912; Burara Swinhoe, 1893; Ismene Swainson, 1820

= Bibasis =

Genus of butterflies

Bibasis, the awlets, are a genus of mostly-diurnal skipper butterflies. The genus is confined to the Indomalayan realm. Vane-Wright and de Jong (2003) state that Bibasis contains just three diurnal species (B. aquilina, B. iluska, B. sena), the remainder having been removed to Burara. Hideyuki Chiba's 2009 revision of subfamily Coeliadinae retained those three and added B. mahintha as a fourth species.

== Species ==
- Bibasis iluska (Hewitson, 1867) – Sulawesi
- Bibasis mahintha Moore 1874 – Myanmar, Thailand, Laos, Vietnam
- Bibasis nestor (Möschler, 1878) – Indonesia (Java, Lombok, Suwumba, etc)
- Bibasis sena (Moore, 1866) – orange-tailed awlet – India, Sri Lanka, China, Myanmar, Thailand, Vietnam, Indonesia (Sumatra, Sulawesi, etc), Malaysia, Philippines.
