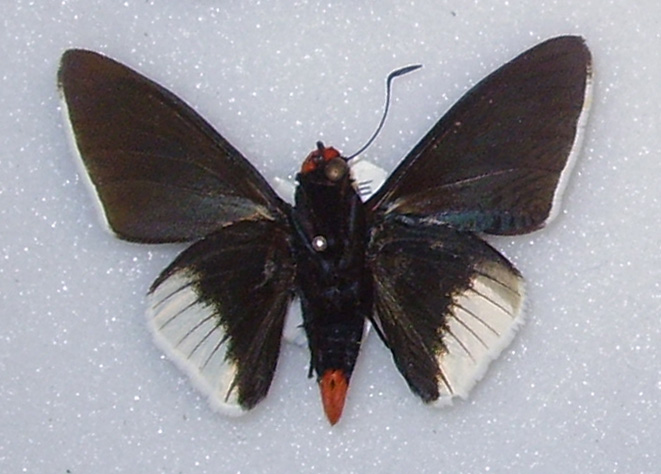
- Male Pyrrhopyge sergius specimen (left antenna missing)

Scientific classification
- Kingdom: Animalia
- Phylum: Arthropoda
- Clade: Pancrustacea
- Class: Insecta
- Order: Lepidoptera
- Family: Hesperiidae
- Subfamily: Pyrrhopyginae; Mabille, 1877

= Firetips =

Firetips, firetail skippers

Tribe of butterflies

Firetips or firetail skippers are skipper butterflies in the subfamily Pyrrhopyginae (family Hesperiidae). The roughly 150 species are found only in the Neotropics, with the exception of one species which just reaches into the United States. Their common names refer to the red tuft at the end of the abdomen of many Pyrrhopyginae.

== Tribes ==
Pyrrhopyginae contains the following tribes:

- Azonaxini
- Oxynetrini
- Passovini
- Pyrrhopygini
- Zoniini
