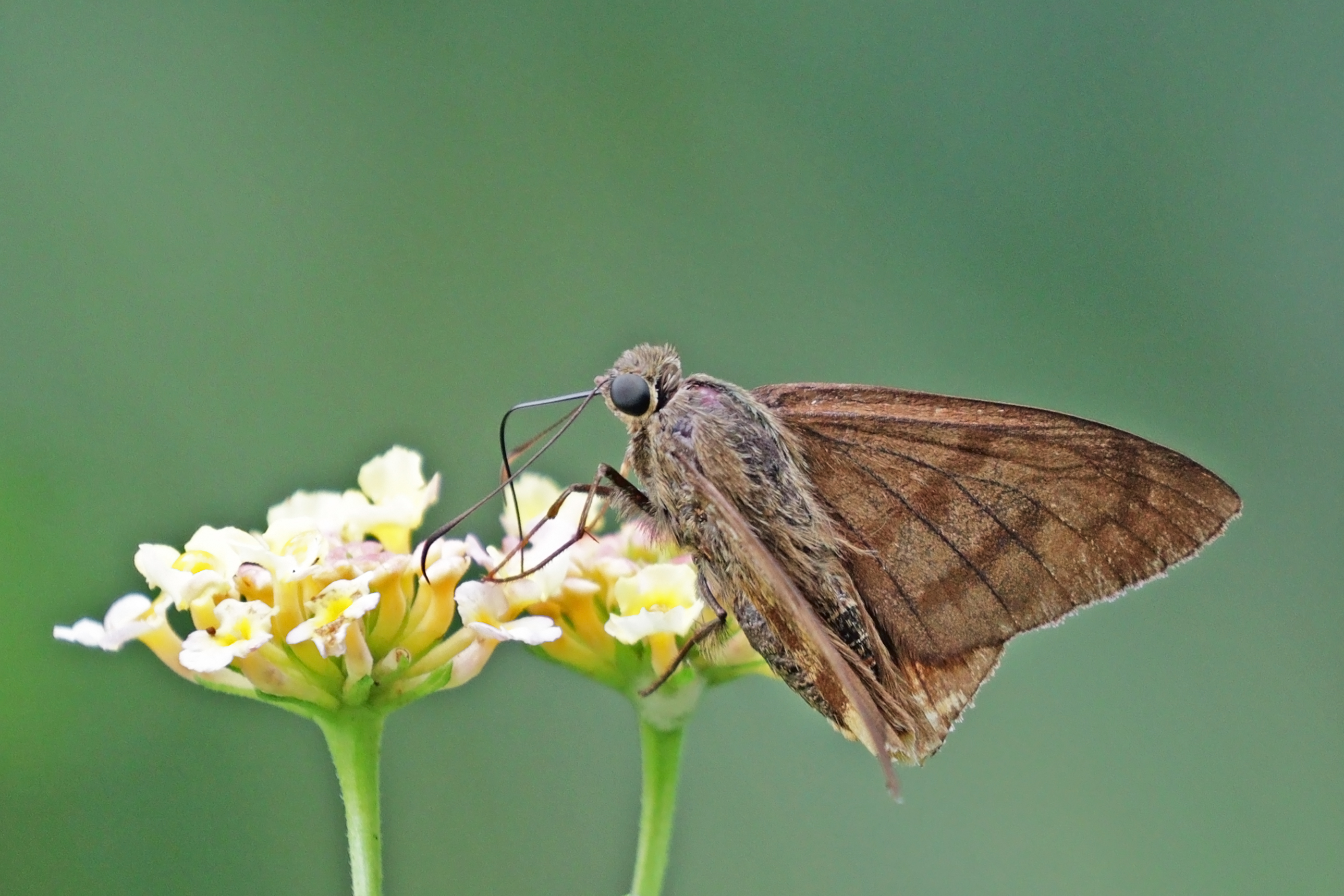
- T. a. annetta in Costa Rica
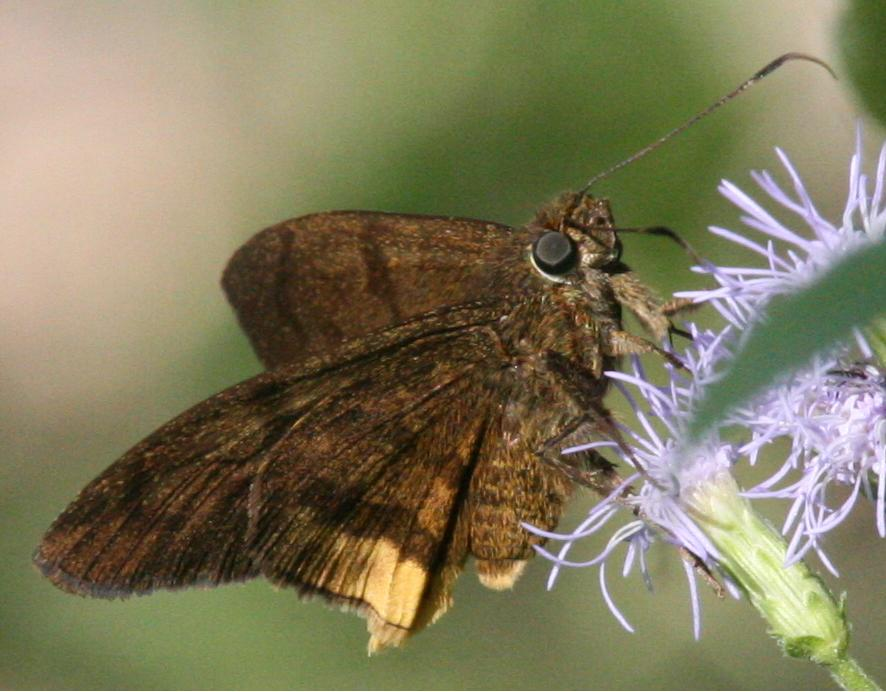
- T. a. annetta

Scientific classification
- Kingdom: Animalia
- Phylum: Arthropoda
- Class: Insecta
- Order: Lepidoptera
- Family: Hesperiidae
- Genus: Telegonus
- Species: T. anaphus

Binomial name
- Telegonus anaphus (Cramer, [1777])

Synonyms
- List: Papilio anaphus Cramer, [1777]; Aethilla anaphus (Cramer, [1777]); Papilio leucogramma Sepp, [1830]; Thymele grenadensis Schaus, 1902; Telegonus alpistus Mabille, 1903; Telegonus roysi Avinoff & Shoumatoff, 1941; Astraptes anaphus (Cramer, [1777])

= Telegonus anaphus =

Species of butterfly

Telegonus anaphus, the yellow-tipped flasher or dull astraptes, is a species of skipper butterfly in the subfamily Eudaminae. It is found from Argentina, north through Central America to the West Indies and Mexico. Strays can be found up to the lower Rio Grande Valley in Texas.

The wingspan is 51–64 mm. Adults are on wing from April to May and from September to November in southern Texas. There are many flights beginning in March in Mexico. In Costa Rica, it occurs during both the dry and wet seasons.

The larvae feed on vines in the Fabaceae.

== Subspecies ==
The following subspecies are recognised:

- Telegonus anaphus anaphus - Suriname, Brazil (Bahia)
- Telegonus anaphus anausis - St. Vincent, Grenada, Dominica, Hispaniola, Cuba, Jamaica
- Telegonus anaphus aniza - Peru
- Telegonus anaphus annetta - from Texas to Peru
- Telegonus anaphus anoma - Trinidad
