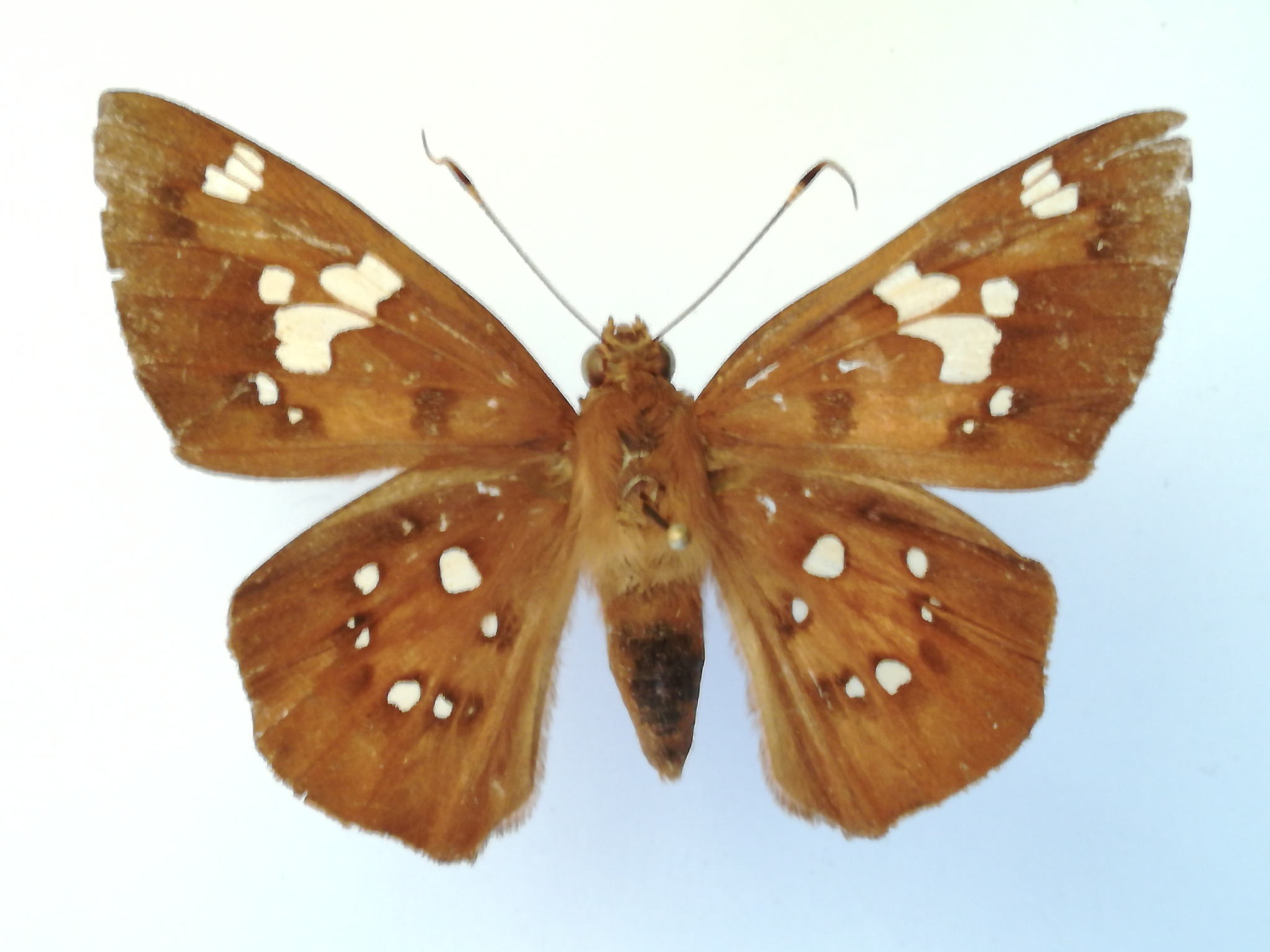
- Dyscophellus porcius

Scientific classification
- Kingdom: Animalia
- Phylum: Arthropoda
- Class: Insecta
- Order: Lepidoptera
- Family: Hesperiidae
- Tribe: Phocidini
- Genus: Dyscophellus; Godman & Salvin, [1893]

Synonyms
- Dyscophus Burmeister, 1878

= Dyscophellus =

Genus of butterflies

Dyscophellus is a genus of largely Neotropical butterflies in the family Hesperiidae. The genus has been the subject of recent revisions based on genome analysis. It is currently placed in tribe Phocidini within the subfamily Eudaminae.

== Species ==
- Dyscophellus australis Grishin, 2022
- Dyscophellus basialbus Grishin, 2022
- Dyscophellus damias (Plötz, 1882)
- Dyscophellus diaphorus (Mabille & Boullet, 1912)
- Dyscophellus doriscus (Hewitson, 1867)
- Dyscophellus mielkei Austin, 2008
- Dyscophellus porcius (C. & R. Felder, 1862)
- Dyscophellus porsena (E. Bell, 1934)
- Dyscophellus ramon Evans, 1952
- Dyscophellus ramusis (Stoll, [1781])
- Dyscophellus sebaldus (Stoll, [1781])

== Former species ==
- Dyscophellus erythras (Mabille, 1888), synon. to D. damias.
- Dyscophellus euribates (Stoll, [1782]), now Euriphellus euribates.
- Dyscophellus marian Evans, 1952, now Euriphellus marian.
- Dyscophellus nicephorus (Hewitson, 1876), now Nicephellus nicephorus.
- Dyscophellus phraxanor (Hewitson, 1876), now Euriphellus phraxanor.
