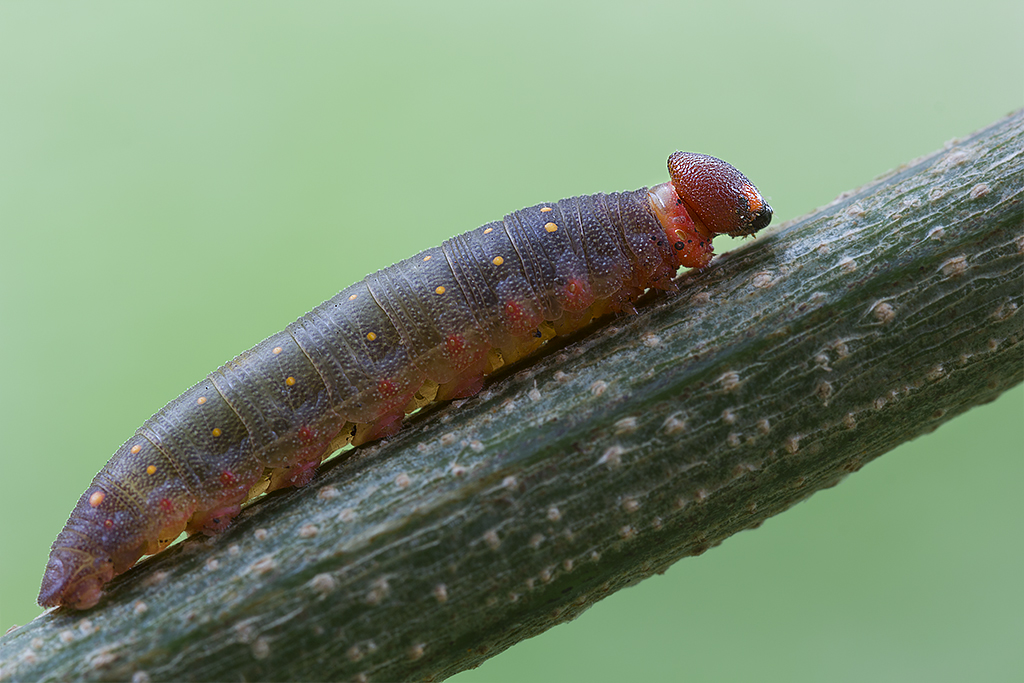

Scientific classification
- Kingdom: Animalia
- Phylum: Arthropoda
- Class: Insecta
- Order: Lepidoptera
- Family: Hesperiidae
- Genus: Nascus
- Species: N. paulliniae

Binomial name
- Nascus paulliniae (Sepp, 1842)

Synonyms
- Pseudonascus paulliniae (Sepp, 1848)

= Nascus paulliniae =

Species of butterfly

Nascus paulliniae is a species of butterfly belonging to the family of skippers.

== Appearance ==
A medium-sized (wing span 40-50 millimeter), brown skipper with white cross bands on the forewings, and a white spot outside this.

== Life cycle ==
The larvae live on plants in the family Sapindaceae.

== Distribution ==
The species is found throughout Central and South America, from Mexico southwards to Brazil.
