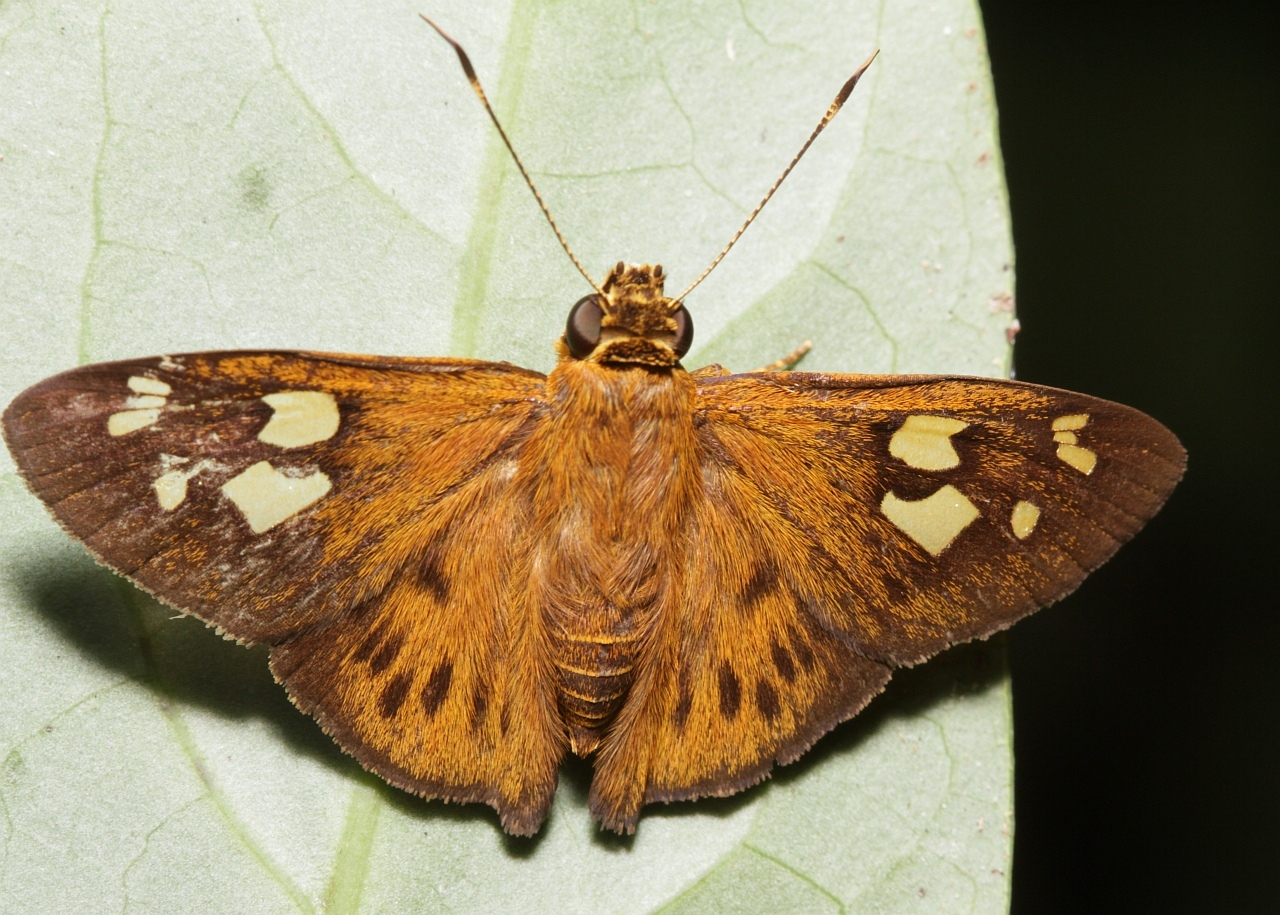
- Aurina azines

Scientific classification
- Kingdom: Animalia
- Phylum: Arthropoda
- Clade: Pancrustacea
- Class: Insecta
- Order: Lepidoptera
- Family: Hesperiidae
- Tribe: Phocidini
- Genus: Aurina; Evans, 1937

= Aurina =

Genus of butterflies

Aurina is a genus of skippers in the family Hesperiidae, in which it is placed in tribe Phocidini.

== Species ==
- Aurina azines (Hewitson, 1867)
- Aurina dida Evans, 1937 - "Ivory Coast" but possibly Guianas

== Taxonomy ==
Previously considered monotypic, the genus now contains two species: Aurina dida Evans, 1937, which was described from the "Ivory Coast" (but where the original locality is dubious as could be ascribed to mislabelling after transit of historical specimens to Europe from collections in South America via the West African coast) and Aurina azines (Hewitson, 1867), transferred from genus Oileides, which is found in South America.
