= Oechydrus =

Scientific classification
- Kingdom: Animalia
- Phylum: Arthropoda
- Class: Insecta
- Order: Lepidoptera
- Family: Hesperiidae
- Subtribe: Typhedanina
- Genus: Oechydrus; Watson, 1893

Genus of butterflies

Oechydrus is a genus of Neotropical butterflies in the family Hesperiidae (Eudaminae).

== Species ==
There are two species recognised in the genus Oechydrus:

- Oechydrus chersis (Herrich-Schäffer, 1869)
  - O. c. chersis (Herrich-Schäffer, 1869) - Bolivia
  - O. c. ochrilinea (Schaus, 1902) - Peru
  - O. c. rufus Evans, 1953 - Brazil (Rio de Janeiro)
- Oechydrus evelinda (Butler, 1870) - Brazil (Rio de Janeiro)
