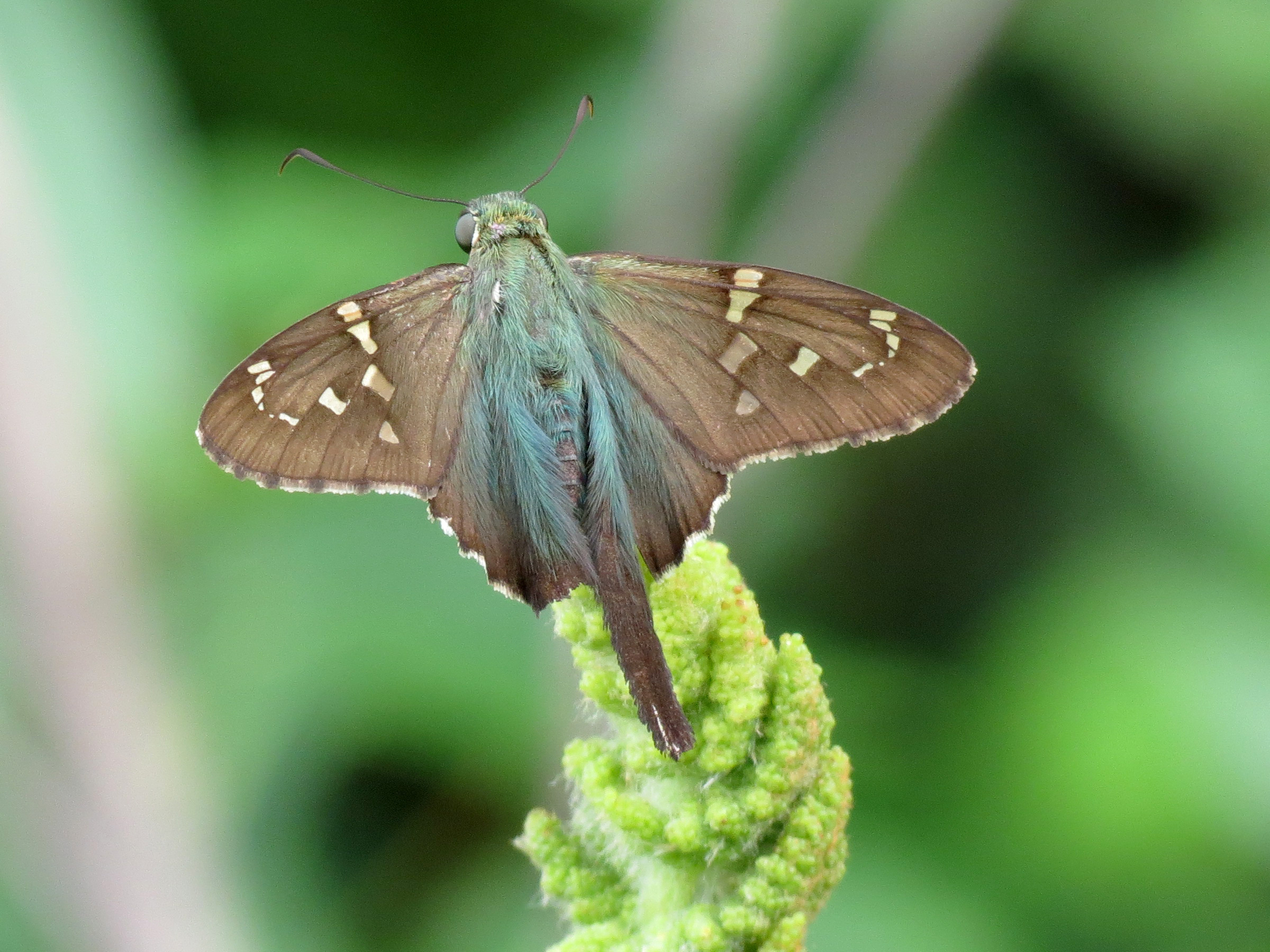
- Long-tailed skipper (Urbanus proteus)

Scientific classification
- Kingdom: Animalia
- Phylum: Arthropoda
- Clade: Pancrustacea
- Class: Insecta
- Order: Lepidoptera
- Family: Hesperiidae
- Subfamily: Eudaminae
- Genus: Urbanus; Hübner, [1807]

Synonyms
- Goniurus Hübner, [1819]; Eudamus Swainson, 1831; Lyroptera Plötz, 1881

= Urbanus (butterfly) =

Genus of butterflies

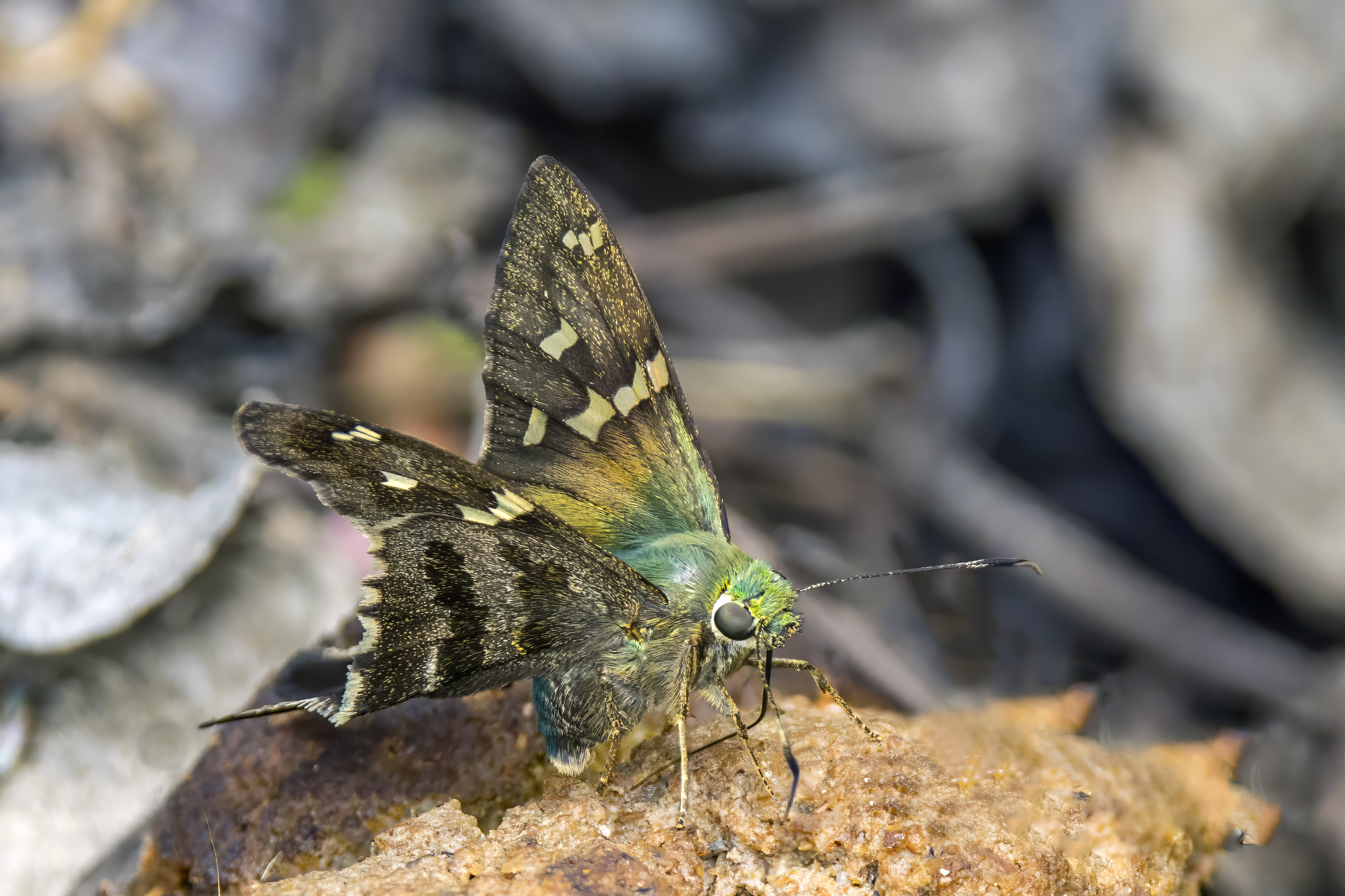
U. bernikerni, Colombia

Urbanus is a genus of skipper butterflies erected by Jacob Hübner in 1807, placed to subtribe Eudamina. Species of the genus are found from the southern United States to South America.

== Taxonomy ==
The genus has been subject to several revisions, one of which led to the type genus of subfamily Eudaminae, genus Eudamus, becoming a junior synonym of Urbanus. As a result of genome analysis of the Eudaminae, several species formerly considered part of Urbanus have been transferred to other genera, including to Cecropterus and Spicauda. Subsequently, Urbanus alva has been proposed as being distinct with the statement "Urbanus alva Evans, 1952 is a valid species and not a synonym of Urbanus belli (Hayward, 1935), new status." (See Zhang et al. 2019)

=== Species ===
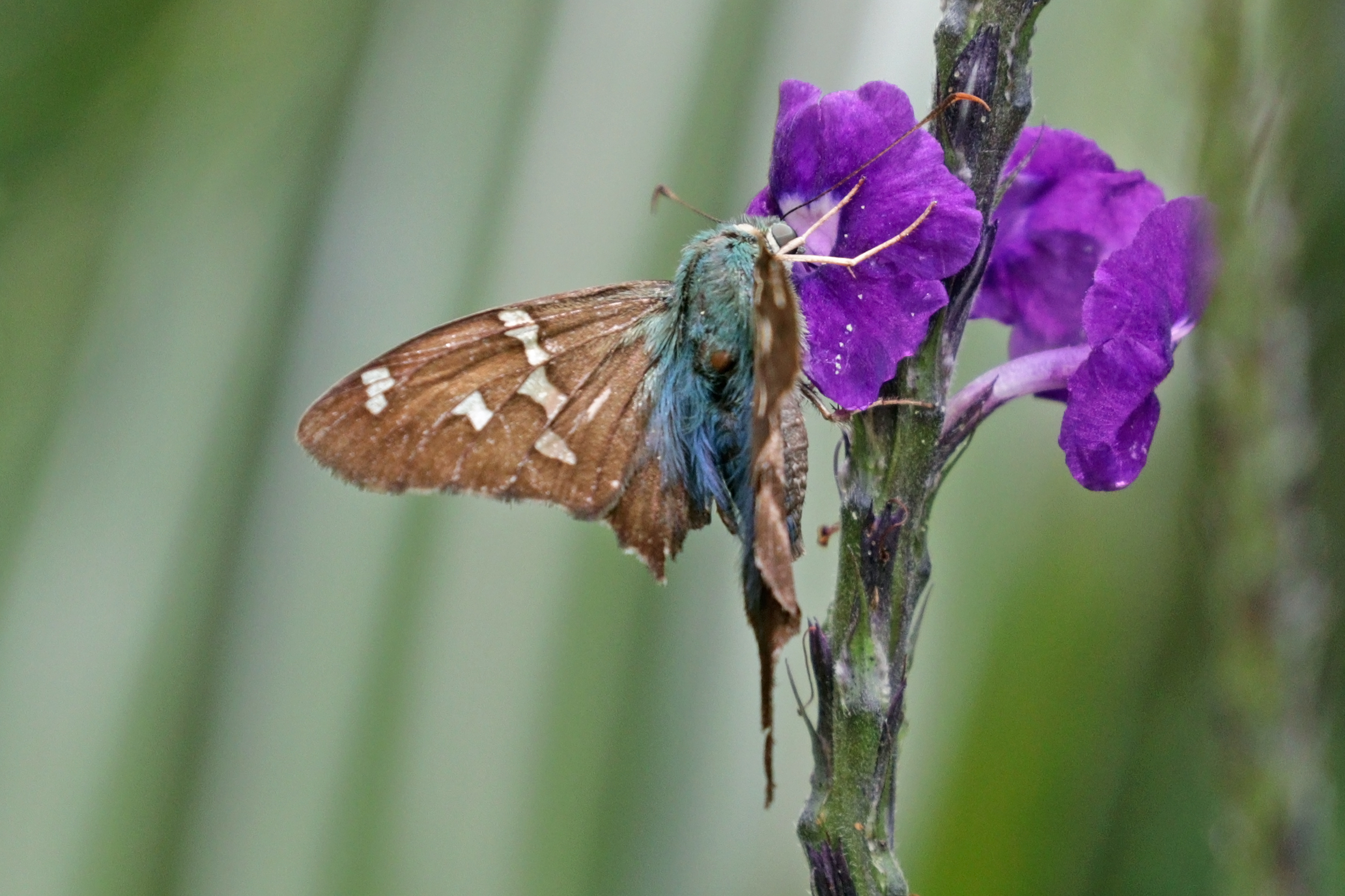
Esmeralda longtail (Urbanus esmeraldus), Costa Rica

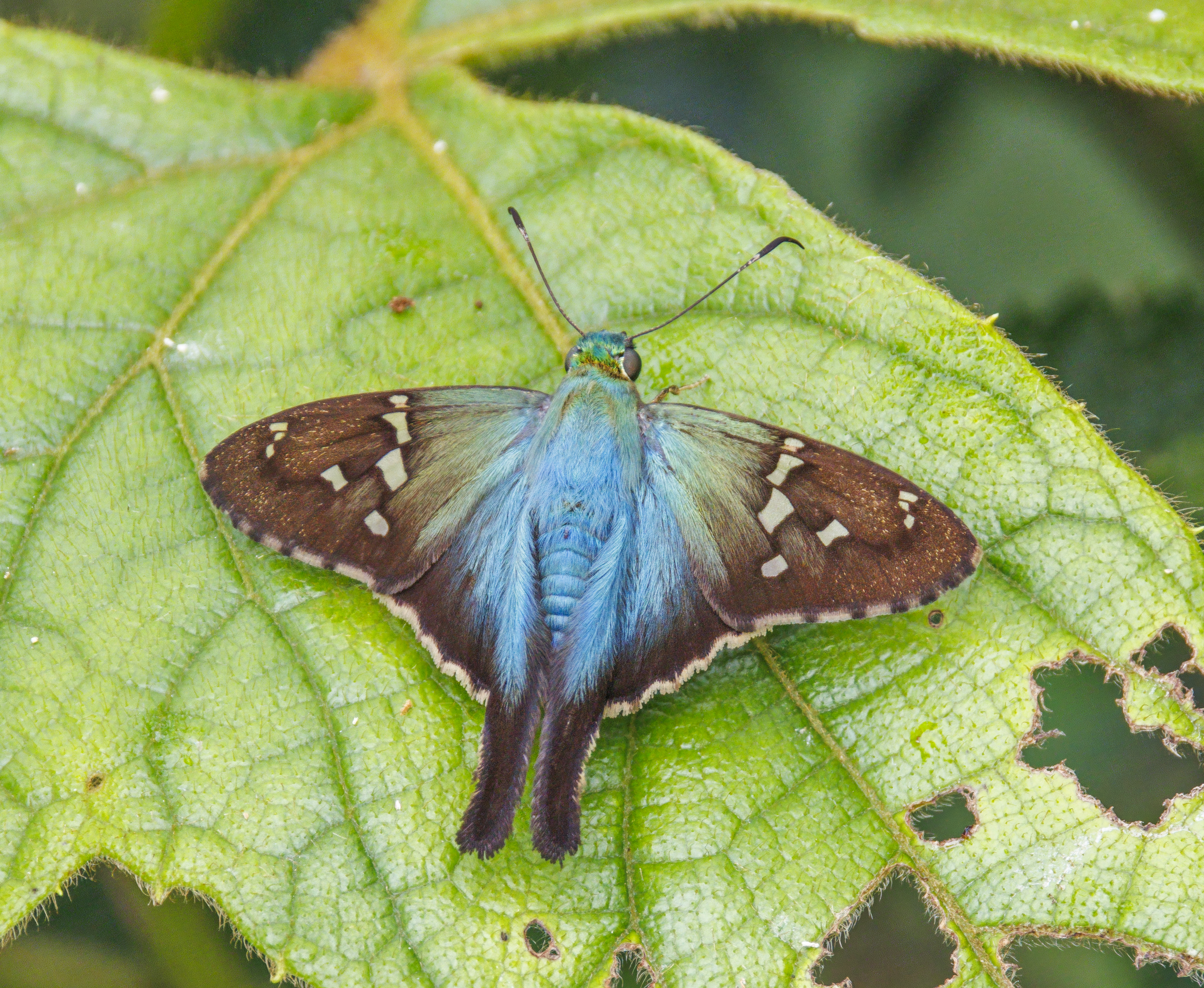
Spot-banded longtail (Urbanus esmeraldus), Ecuador

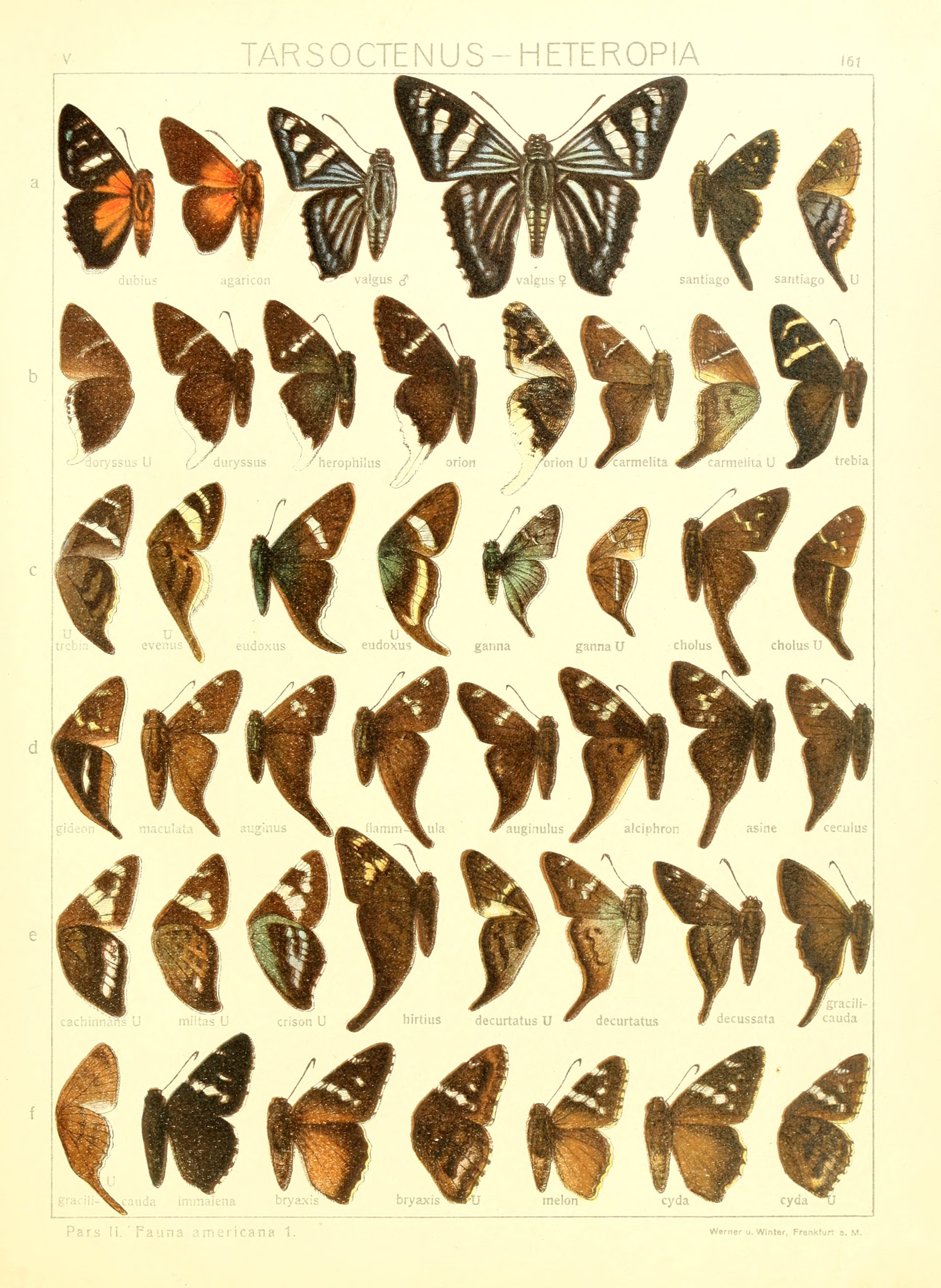
Urbanus and related genera depicted in Adalbert Seitz's Macrolepidoptera of the World

Except where separately referenced, this species list follows the classification of Li et al. 2019, with distribution data sourced from Markku Savela's Lepidoptera and Some Other Life Forms.

==== Subgenus Urbanoides ====
- Urbanus elmina Evans, 1952 – Ecuador
- Urbanus esma Evans, 1952 – Brazil
- Urbanus esmeraldus (A. Butler, 1877) – Mexico, Costa Rica, Guatemala, Panama, Honduras to Brazil, Colombia
- Urbanus esta Evans, 1952 – Mexican coasts to Ecuador and Brazil
- Urbanus evona Evans, 1952 – Mexico, Guatemala
- Urbanus prodicus E. Bell, 1956 – Mexico
- Urbanus viridis H. Freeman, 1970 – Mexico

==== Subgenus Urbanus ====
- Urbanus alva Evans, 1952 – Mexico
- Urbanus belli (Hayward, 1935) – Mexico [?] to Bolivia, Argentina
- Urbanus bernikerni Burns, 2014
- Urbanus dubius Steinhauser, 1981 – Colombia
- Urbanus ehakernae Burns, 2014
- Urbanus huancavillcas (R. Williams, 1926) – Ecuador
- Urbanus longicaudus Austin, 1998 – Brazil
- Urbanus magnus Steinhauser, 1981 – Ecuador
- Urbanus megalurus (Mabille, 1877)
- Urbanus oplerorum
- Urbanus parvus Austin, 1998 – Brazil
- Urbanus pronta Evans, 1952 – Mexico, Honduras, to Ecuador
- Urbanus pronus Evans, 1952 – Central America, Ecuador, Bolivia, Brazil, Paraguay; Mexico
- Urbanus proteus (Linnaeus, 1758) – southern US, Mexico, Central & South America
  - Urbanus proteus proteus (Linnaeus, 1758) – Mexico
  - Urbanus proteus domingo (Scudder, 1872) – Saba to Grenada, Haiti
- Urbanus rickardi
- Urbanus segnestami Burns, 2014
- Urbanus tucuti (R. Williams, 1927)
- Urbanus velinus (Plötz, 1881) – Brazil, Guyana
- Urbanus villus Austin, 1998 – Brazil
- Urbanus viterboana (Ehrmann, 1907) – Mexico to Colombia, Ecuador.

=== Former species ===
Transferred to Cecropterus:

- Urbanus dorantes (Stoll, 1790)
- Urbanus obscurus (Hewitson, 1867)
- Urbanus evenus (Ménétriés, 1855)
- Urbanus virescens (Mabille, 1877)
- Urbanus trebia (Möschler, 1879)
- Urbanus carmelita (Herrich-Schäffer, 1869)
- Urbanus reductus (N. Riley, 1919)
- Urbanus doryssus (Swainson, 1831)
- Urbanus albimargo (Mabille, 1875)

Transferred to Spicauda:

- Urbanus teleus (Hübner, 1821)
- Urbanus tanna Evans, 1952
- Urbanus ambiguus de Jong, 1983
- Urbanus cindra Evans, 1952
- Urbanus zagorus (Plötz, 1881)
- Urbanus simplicius (Stoll, 1790)
- Urbanus procne (Plötz, 1881)

Transferred to Telegonus

- Urbanus chalco (Hübner, 1823)
