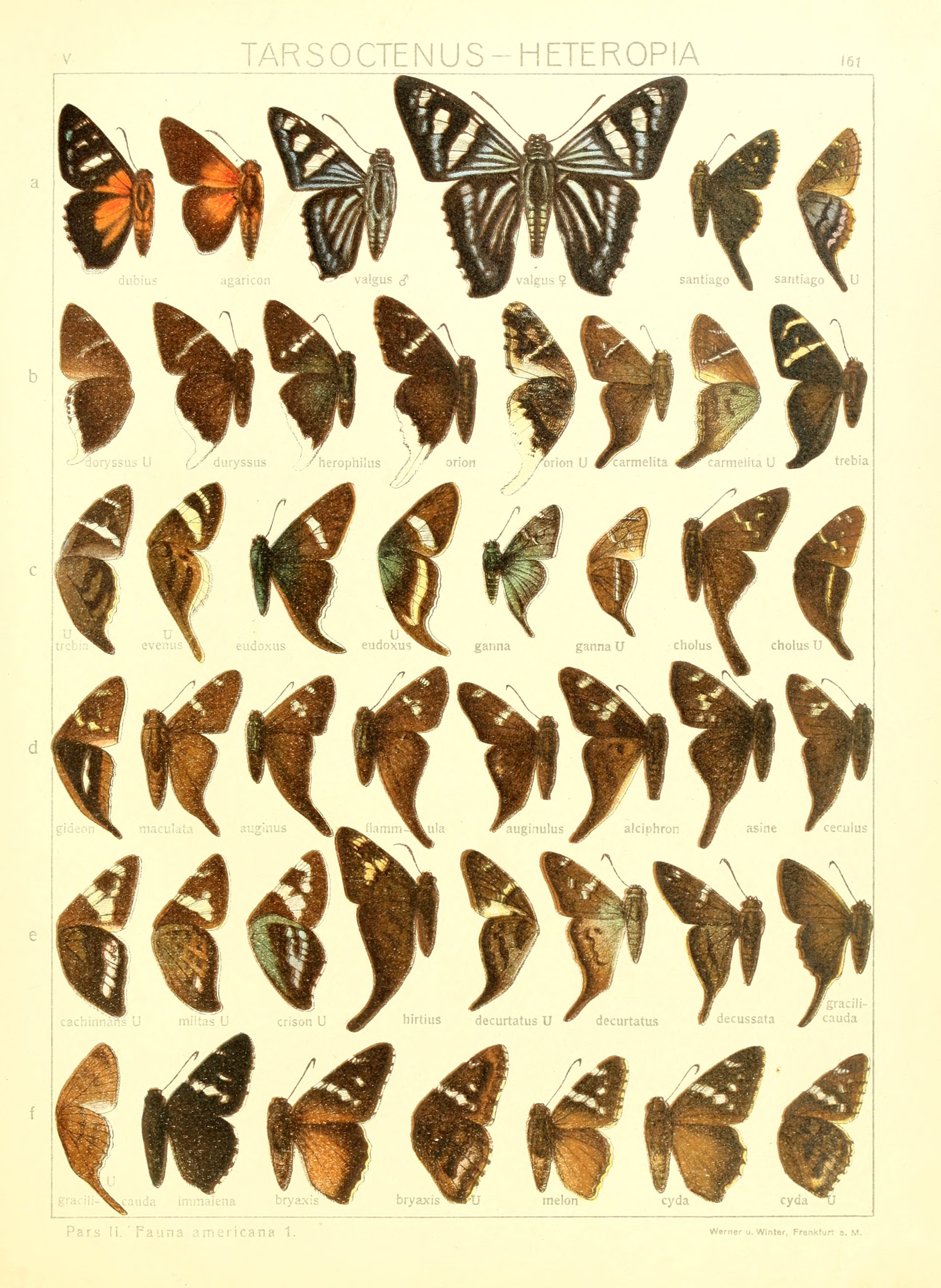
- Ridens spp. and related genera depicted in Adalbert Seitz's Macrolepidoptera of the World

Scientific classification
- Kingdom: Animalia
- Phylum: Arthropoda
- Class: Insecta
- Order: Lepidoptera
- Family: Hesperiidae
- Subtribe: Loboclina
- Genus: Ridens; Evans, 1952

= Ridens =

Genus of butterflies

Ridens is a genus of Neotropical butterflies in the family Hesperiidae (Eudaminae).

== Species ==
- Ridens allyni Freeman, 1979 - Mexico, Guatemala
- Ridens bidens Austin, 1998 - Brazil (Rondônia).
- Ridens biolleyi (Mabille, 1900) - Costa Rica
- Ridens bridgmani (Weeks, 1902) - Ecuador, Bolivia, Brazil
- Ridens crison (Godman & Salvin, [1893])
  - R. crison crison - Guatemala, Mexico
  - R. crison cachinnans (Godman, 1901) - Panama
  - R. crison howarthi Steinhauser, 1974 - El Salvador
- Ridens fieldi Steinhauser, 1974 - Guatemala
- Ridens fulima Evans, 1952 - Brazil (Espírito Santo)
- Ridens fulminans (Herrich-Schäffer, 1869) - Mexico to Brazil
- Ridens harpagus (C. & R. Felder, 1867) - Colombia
- Ridens mephitis (Hewitson, 1876) - Mexico, Panama, Peru, Bolivia, Venezuela
- Ridens mercedes Steinhauser, 1983 - Mexico
- Ridens miltas (Godman & Salvin, [1893]) - Mexico
- Ridens nora Evans, 1952 - Peru
- Ridens pacasa (Williams, 1927) - Bolivia
- Ridens panche (Williams, 1927) - Colombia
- Ridens philistus (Hopffer, 1874)
  - R. philistus philistus - Peru
  - R. philistus philia Evans, 1952 - Colombia
- Ridens ridens (Hewitson, 1876) - Panama to Brazil
- Ridens telegonoides (Mabille & Boullet, 1912) - Colombia
- Ridens toddi Steinhauser, 1974 - El Salvador
- Ridens tristis (Draudt, [1922]) - Bolivia, Peru
