= Phareas =

Scientific classification
- Kingdom: Animalia
- Phylum: Arthropoda
- Clade: Pancrustacea
- Class: Insecta
- Order: Lepidoptera
- Family: Hesperiidae
- Tribe: Phocidini
- Genus: Phareas; Westwood, [1852]

Synonyms
- Grynopsis Watson, 1893

Genus of butterflies

Phareas burnsi

Phareas is a genus of skippers in the family Hesperiidae, within which it is placed in tribe Phocidini.

== Species ==
The following species are recognised in the genus Phareas:

- Phareas burnsi Grishin, 2013
- Phareas coeleste Westwood, 1852
