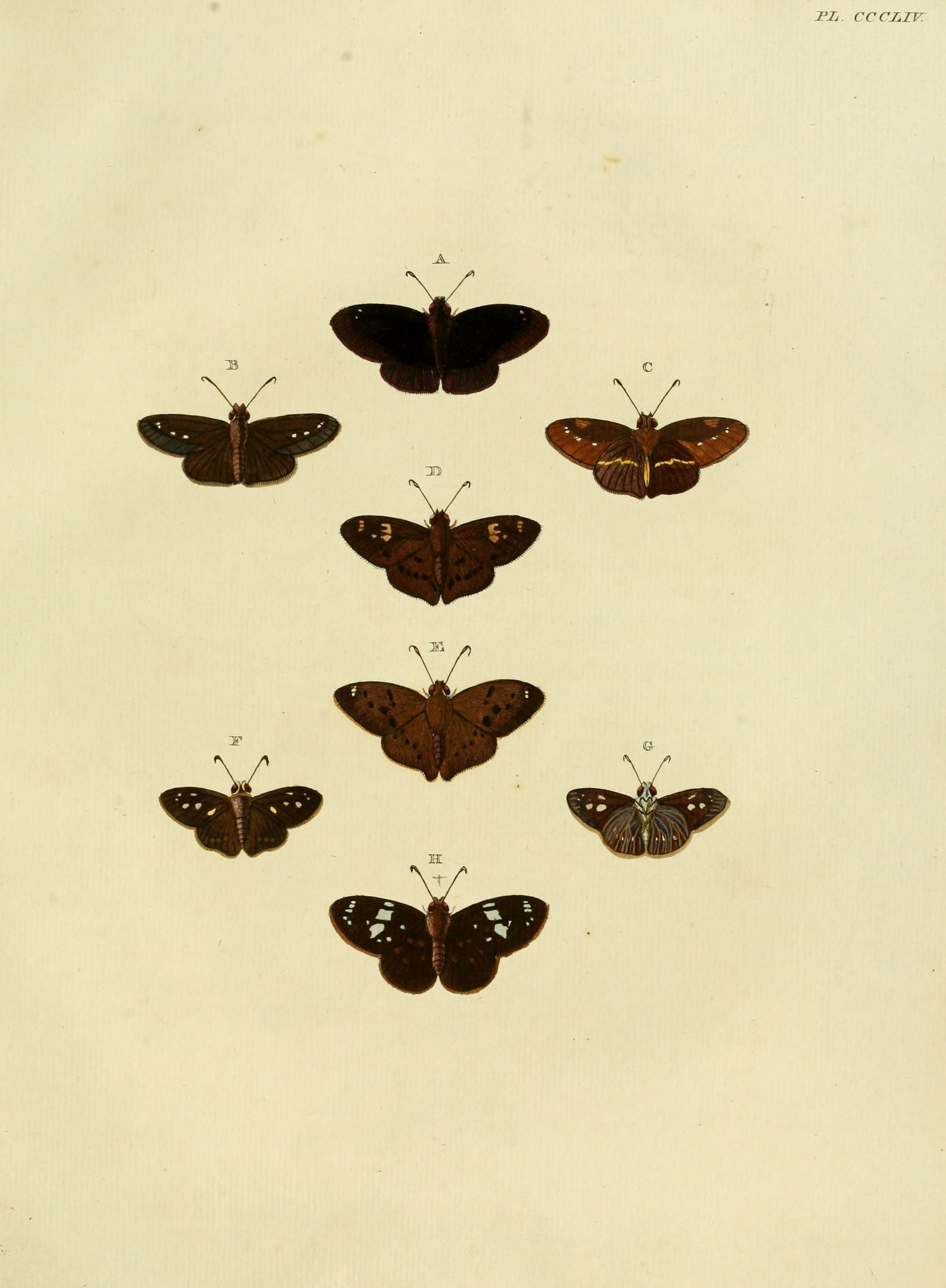
- Depicted in Pieter Cramer and Caspar Stoll's Uitlandsche kapellen

Scientific classification
- Kingdom: Animalia
- Phylum: Arthropoda
- Clade: Pancrustacea
- Class: Insecta
- Order: Lepidoptera
- Family: Hesperiidae
- Subfamily: Eudaminae
- Genus: Telemiades; Hübner, [1819]

Type species
- Telemiades avitus (Stoll, 1781)

Synonyms
- Pyrdalus Mabille, 1903

= Telemiades =

Genus of butterflies

Telemiades is a genus of Neotropical butterflies in the family Hesperiidae (subfamily Eudaminae).

== Species ==
The following species are recognised in the genus Telemiades:

- Telemiades amphion (Geyer, 1832)
  - T. amphion amphion (Geyer, 1832) - Suriname, Brazil, Venezuela
  - T. amphion pekahia (Hewitson, 1868) - Venezuela
  - T. amphion misitheus (Mabille, 1888) - Peru
  - T. amphion marpesus (Hewitson, 1876) - Brazil
- Telemiades antiope (Plötz, 1882) - Suriname, Peru, Brazil
  - T. amphion antiope (Plötz, 1882))
  - T. amphion tosca (Evans, 1953)
- Telemiades atlantiope Siewert, Mielke & Casagrande, 2020 - Brazil, Argentina
- Telemiades austini Siewert, Mielke & Casagrande, 2020 - Mexico to Panama
- Telemiades avitus (Stoll, 1781) - Mexico, Guianas, Suriname, Brazil, Argentina
- Telemiades belli Siewert, Mielke & Casagrande, 2020 - Guatemala, Honduras, Nicaragua, Costa Rica, Panama, Colombia
- Telemiades brazus Bell, 1949 - Brazil
- Telemiades centrites (Hewitson, 1870) - Ecuador
- Telemiades choricus (Schaus, 1902) - Mexico
- Telemiades chrysorrhoea (Godman & Salvin, 1893)
- Telemiades contra Evans, 1953 - Ecuador
- Telemiades corbulo (Stoll, 1781)
- Telemiades cryptus Siewert, Mielke & Casagrande, 2020 - Colombia, Brazil
- Telemiades dawkinsi Siewert, Mielke & Casagrande, 2020 - Brazil
- Telemiades delalande (Latreille, 1924) - Brazil, Costa Rica
- Telemiades epicalus Hübner, 1819 - Suriname, French Guiana, Brazil, Venezuela
- Telemiades esmeraldus Siewert, Mielke & Casagrande, 2020 - Ecuador
- Telemiades fides Bell, 1949
- Telemiades gallius (Mabille, 1888) - Panama, Colombia
- Telemiades lamasi Siewert, Mielke & Casagrande, 2020 - Mexico, El Salvador, Nicaragua, Costa Rica, Panama, Colombia, and Peru
- Telemiades laogonus (Hewitson, 1876) - Brazil, Argentina
  - T. laogonus laogunus (Hewitson, 1876) - Brazil, Argentina
  - T. laogonus nicola (Plötz, 1882) - Brazil
- Telemiades litanicus (Hewitson, 1876) - Brazil
- Telemiades megallus Mabille, 1888 - Mexico, Panama, Colombia
- Telemiades meris (Plötz, 1886) - Colombia
- Telemiades mielkei Siewert & Casagrande, 2020 - Peru
- Telemiades moa Siewert, Mielke & Casagrande, 2020 - Brazil
- Telemiades nicki Siewert, Mielke & Casagrande, 2021 - Peru
- Telemiades nicomedes (Möschler, 1879) - Mexico, Colombia, Brazil, French Guiana
- Telemiades oiclus (Mabille, 1889)
- Telemiades pallidus Siewert, Mielke & Casagrande, 2020 - Brazil
- Telemiades penidas (Hewitson, 1867) - Brazil, Suriname, Peru, Venezuela
- Telemiades pseudotrenda Siewert, Mielke & Casagrande, 2020 - Costa Rica
- Telemiades quammeni Siewert, Mielke & Casagrande, 2020 - Brazil
- Telemiades sila Evans, 1953 - Venezuela
- Telemiades squanda Evans, 1953 - Brazil
- Telemiades trenda Evans, 1953
- Telemiades vansa Evans, 1953 - Guyana
- Telemiades vespasius (Fabricius, 1793) - Suriname, Brazil
- Telemiades warreni Siewert, Mielke & Casagrande, 2020 - Peru
