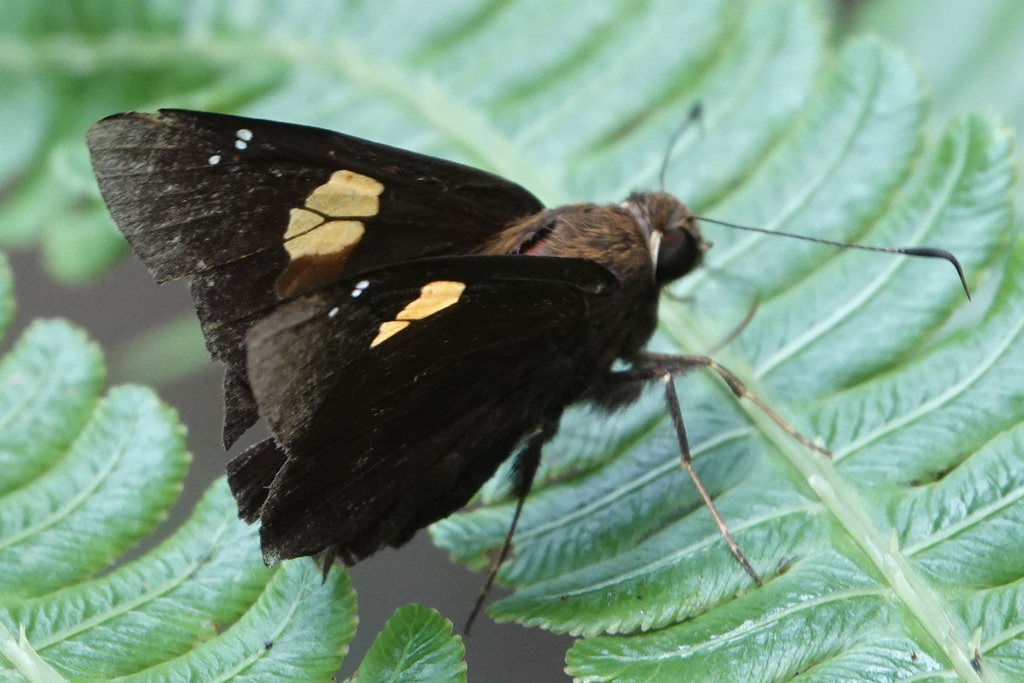

Scientific classification
- Kingdom: Animalia
- Phylum: Arthropoda
- Clade: Pancrustacea
- Class: Insecta
- Order: Lepidoptera
- Family: Hesperiidae
- Tribe: Eudamini
- Genus: Venada; Evans, 1952

= Venada =

Genus of butterflies

Venada is a genus of skippers in the family Hesperiidae.

== Species ==
Venada consists of the following species:

- Venada advena
- Venada cacao
- Venada daneva
- Venada lamella Burns in Burns, Janzen, Hallwachs & Hajibabaei, 2013
- Verdana neranja
- Verdana nevada
