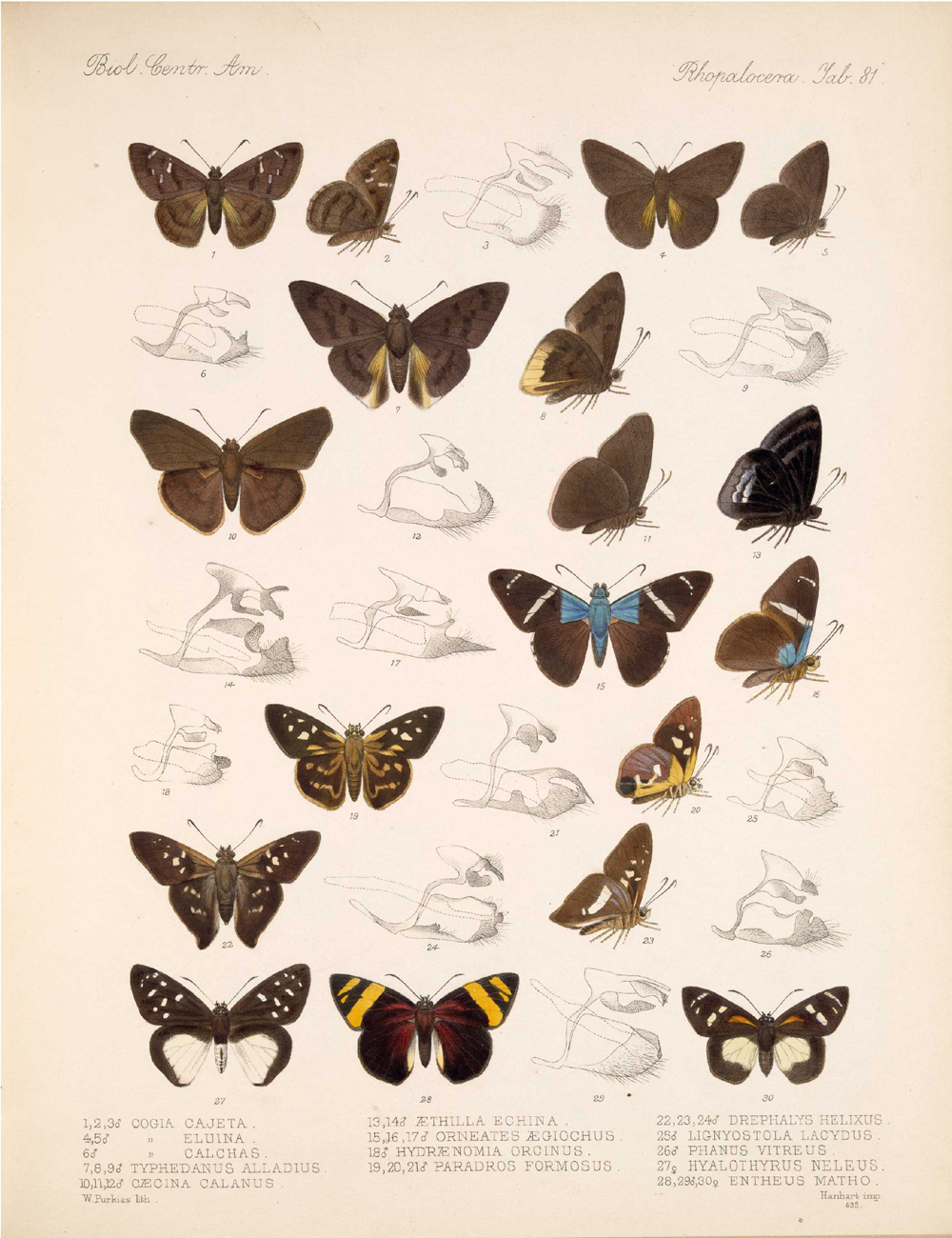
- Drephalys dumeril and related species

Scientific classification
- Kingdom: Animalia
- Phylum: Arthropoda
- Class: Insecta
- Order: Lepidoptera
- Family: Hesperiidae
- Tribe: Entheini
- Genus: Drephalys; Watson, 1893

= Drephalys =

Genus of butterflies

Drephalys is a Neotropical butterfly genus in the family Hesperiidae, in which it is placed in tribe Entheini.

The genus was established in 1893 by Edward Yerbury Watson, who assigned Eudamus helixus (now Drephalys helixus) as type species of the genus.

== Species ==
According to Li et al. 2019, the genus contains the following species across two subgenera:

Subgenus Paradrephalys Burns, 2000

- Drephalys oria Evans, 1952
- Drephalys oriander (Hewitson, 1867)
- Drephalys talboti (Le Cerf, 1922)
- Drephalys dumeril (Latreille, [1824])
- Drephalys croceus Austin, 1995
- Drephalys tortus Austin, 1995

Subgenus Drephalys E. Watson, 1893

- Drephalys alcmon (Cramer, 1780)
- Drephalys mourei O. Mielke, 1968
- Drephalys helixus (Hewitson, 1877)
- Drephalys kidonoi Burns, 2000
- Drephalys phoenicoides (Mabille & Boullet, 1919)
- Drephalys phoenice (Hewitson, 1867)
- Drephalys heraclides E. Bell, 1942
- Drephalys citrinus Madruga, Siewert, O. Mielke & Casagrande, 2018
- Drephalys dracarys Madruga, Siewert, O. Mielke & Dolibaina, 2018
- Drephalys electrinus Siewert, Madruga, O. Mielke & Dolibaina, 2018
- Drephalys miersi O. Mielke, 1968
- Drephalys opifex Evans, 1952
- Drephalys olvina Evans, 1952
- Drephalys olva Evans, 1952
- Drephalys eous (Hewitson, 1867)

== Original publication ==
Watson, E. Y. (1893). "A proposed classification of the Hesperiidae, with a revision of the genera". Proceedings of the Zoological Society of London. 1893: 34.
