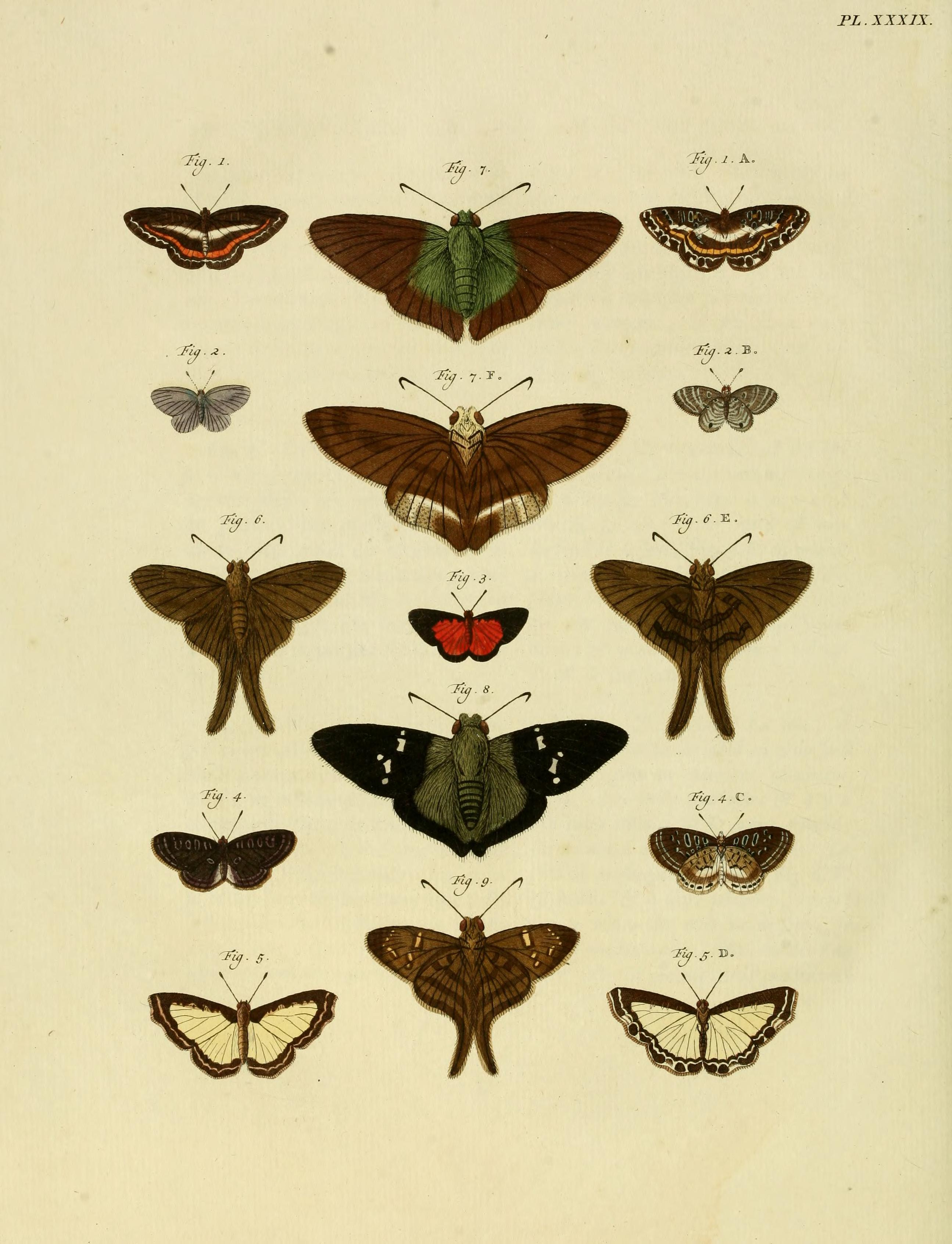
- Narcosius narcosius figure 8

Scientific classification
- Kingdom: Animalia
- Phylum: Arthropoda
- Class: Insecta
- Order: Lepidoptera
- Family: Hesperiidae
- Subtribe: Eudamina
- Genus: Narcosius; Steinhauser, 1986

= Narcosius =

Genus of butterflies

Narcosius is a genus of butterflies in the family Hesperiidae (Eudaminae).

== Species ==
- Narcosius aulina (Evans, 1952) - French Guiana
- Narcosius colossus (Herrich-Schäffer, 1869) - Mexico, Venezuela
- Narcosius dosula (Evans, 1952) - Brazil
- Narcosius granadensis (Möschler, 1879) - Venezuela, Peru, Brazil
- Narcosius helen (Evans, 1952) - Mexico, Honduras
- Narcosius hercules (Bell, 1956) - Bolivia, Brazil
- Narcosius mura (Williams, 1927) - Brazil
- Narcosius narcosius (Stoll, [1790]) - Suriname, Peru, Bolivia, Brazil
- Narcosius nazaraeus Steinhauser, 1986 - Mexico
- Narcosius odysseus Austin, 1996 - Brazil
- Narcosius parisi (Williams, 1927) - Brazil
- Narcosius pseudomura Austin, 1996 - Brazil
- Narcosius samson (Evans, 1952) - Mexico, Colombia, Brazil
- Narcosius steinhauseri Austin, 1996 - Brazil
