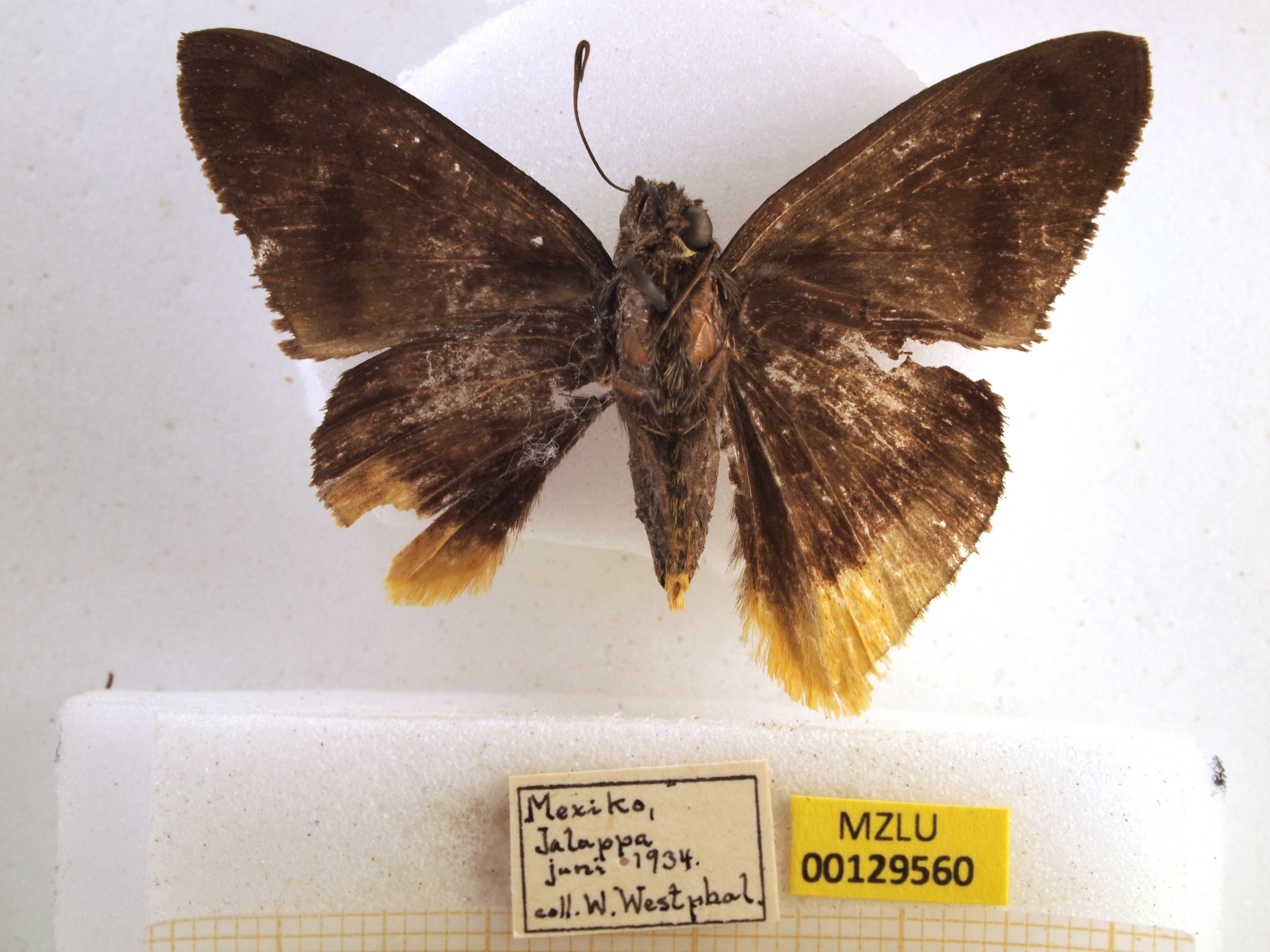
- Typhedanus ampyx

Scientific classification
- Kingdom: Animalia
- Phylum: Arthropoda
- Class: Insecta
- Order: Lepidoptera
- Family: Hesperiidae
- Subfamily: Eudaminae
- Tribe: Oileidini
- Genus: Typhedanus; Butler, 1870

= Typhedanus =

Genus of butterflies

Typhedanus is a genus of Neotropical butterflies in the family Hesperiidae (Eudaminae).

== Species ==
The following species are recognised in the genus Typhedanus:

- Typhedanus ampyx (Godman & Salvin, 1893) - Mexico to Costa Rica
- Typhedanus aventinus (Godman & Salvin, 1894) - Mexico
- Typhedanus buena (A. Warren, Dolibaina & Hernández-Mejía, 2015) - Mexico
- Typhedanus cajeta (Herrich-Schäffer, 1869) - Mexico to Costa Rica
- Typhedanus mala (Evans, 1953) - Guatemala
- Typhedanus salas Freeman, 1977 - Mexico, Belize
- Typhedanus umber (Herrich-Schäffer, 1869) - Unknown, possibly Venezuela
