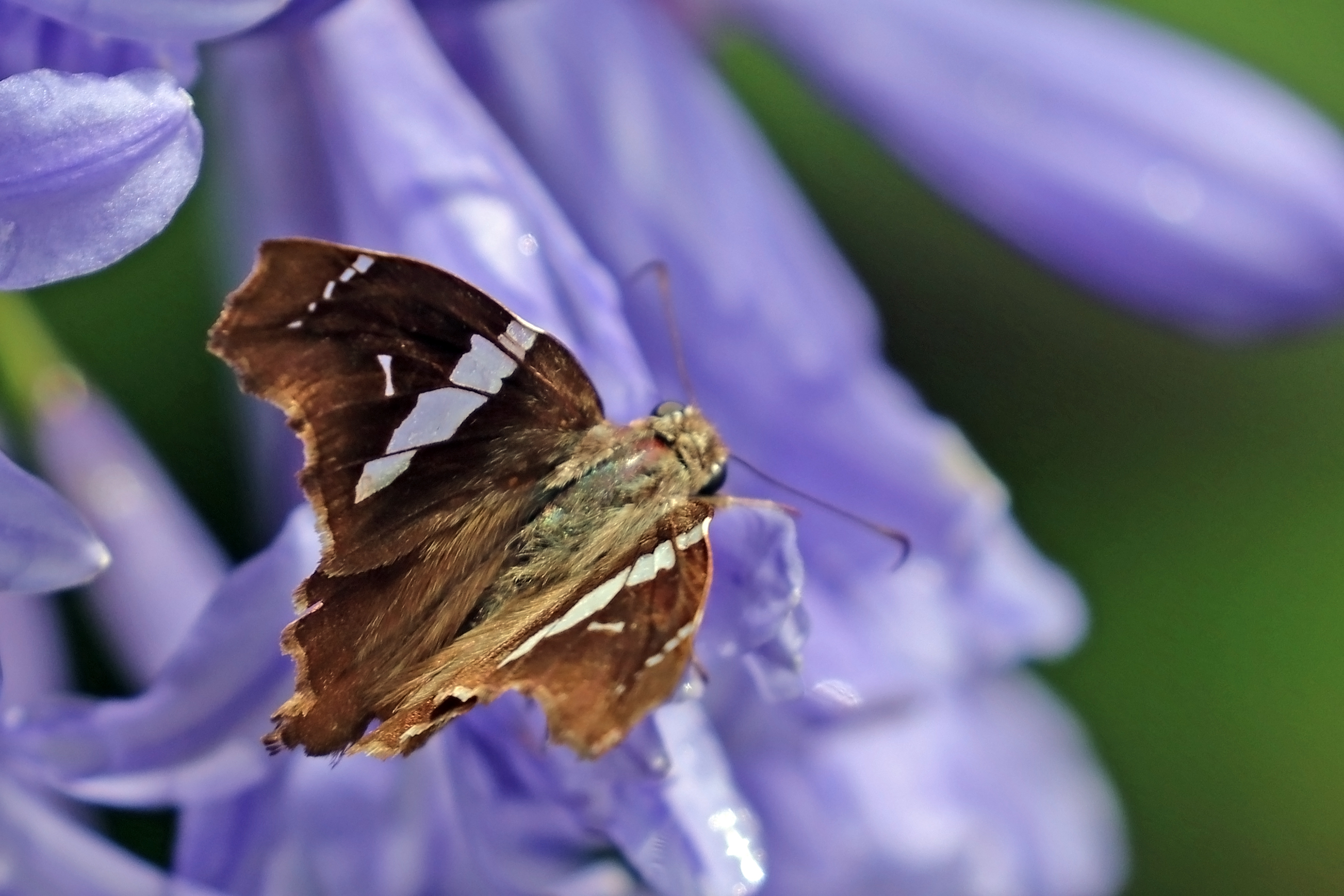
- In Costa Rica

Scientific classification
- Kingdom: Animalia
- Phylum: Arthropoda
- Class: Insecta
- Order: Lepidoptera
- Family: Hesperiidae
- Genus: Spathilepia; Butler, 1870
- Species: S. clonius

Binomial name
- Spathilepia clonius (Cramer, [1775])

= Spathilepia =

Spathilepia clonius

Monotypic genus of skipper butterflies in subfamily Eudaminae

Spathilepia is a butterfly genus in the family Hesperiidae (Eudaminae). The genus is monotypic containing the single species Spathilepia clonius found in Texas, Central America and Colombia to Brazil and Argentina.
