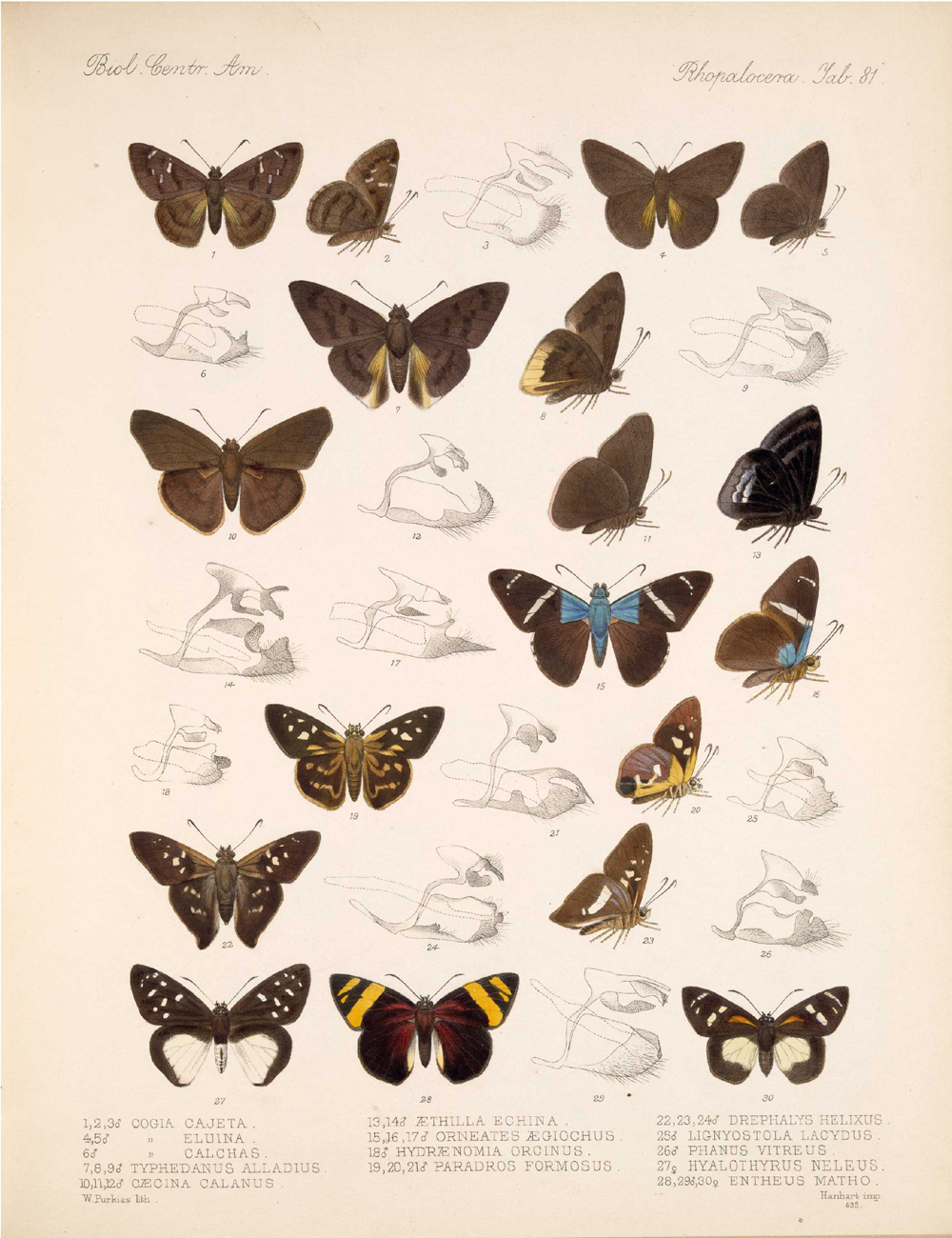
- Figure 26 Phanus vitreus

Scientific classification
- Kingdom: Animalia
- Phylum: Arthropoda
- Class: Insecta
- Order: Lepidoptera
- Family: Hesperiidae
- Tribe: Entheini
- Genus: Phanus; Hübner, [1819]

= Phanus =

Genus of butterflies

Phanus is a genus of butterflies in the family Hesperiidae, in which it is placed in tribe Entheini.

== Species ==
- Phanus albiapicalis Austin, 1993 Mexico
- Phanus australis Miller, 1965 Brazil
- Phanus confusis Austin, 1993 Mexico
- Phanus ecitonorum Austin, 1993 Brazil
- Phanus grandis Austin, 1993 Venezuela
- Phanus marshalli (Kirby, 1880) Mexico, Trinidad
- Phanus obscurior Kaye, 1925
  - P. obscurior obscurior Trinidad
  - P. obscurior prestoni Miller, 1965 Brazil
- Phanus rilma Evans, 1952 Mexico
- Phanus vitreus (Stoll, [1781]) Mexico, Costa Rica to Suriname, French Guiana
