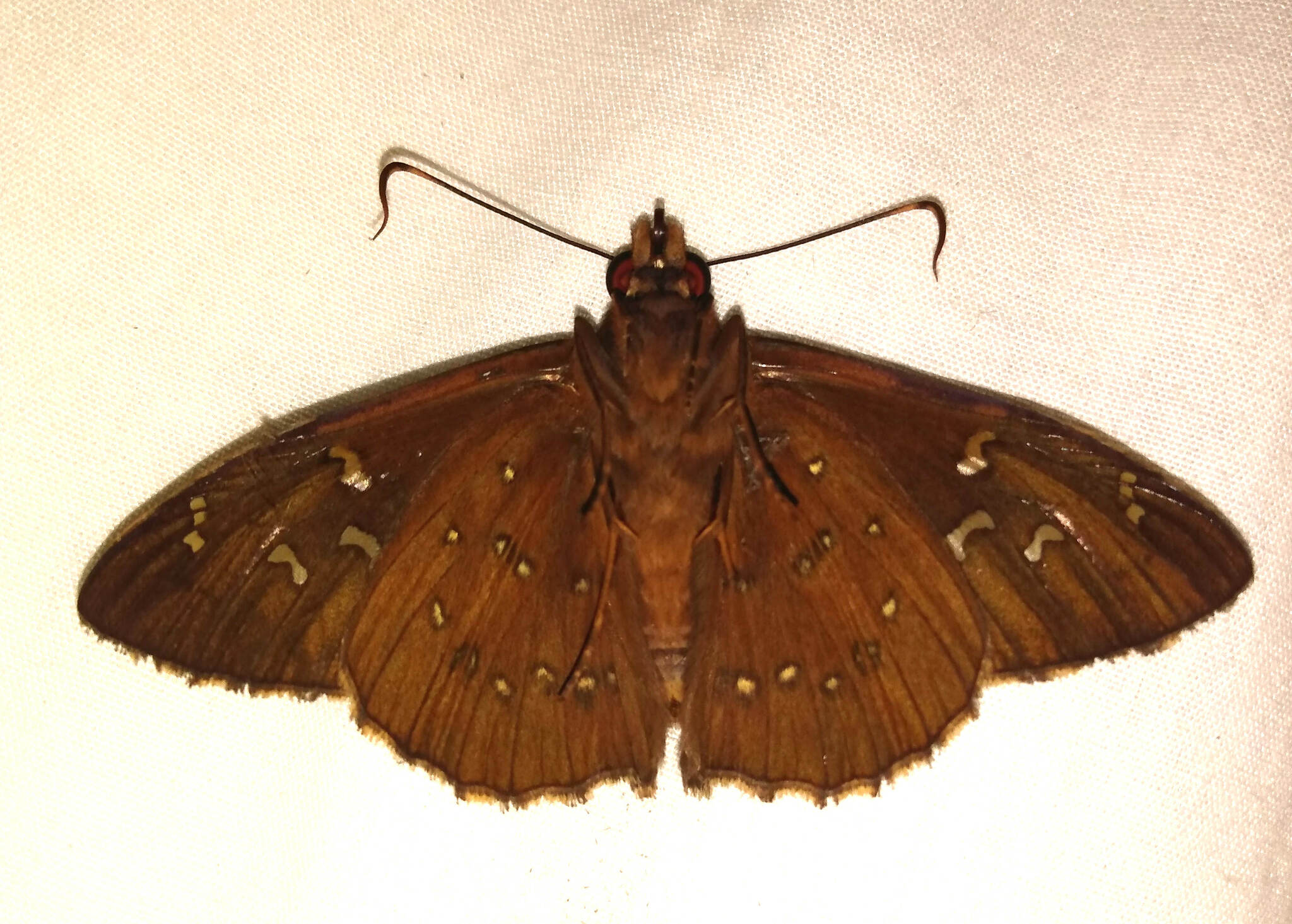
- Sarmientoia similis

Scientific classification
- Kingdom: Animalia
- Phylum: Arthropoda
- Clade: Pancrustacea
- Class: Insecta
- Order: Lepidoptera
- Family: Hesperiidae
- Tribe: Phocidini
- Genus: Sarmientoia; Berg, 1897

= Sarmientoia =

Genus of butterflies

Sarmientoia is a genus of skippers in the family Hesperiidae, in which they are placed to tribe Phocidini.

== Species ==
The following species are recognised in the genus Sarmientoia:

- Sarmientoia phaselis (Hewitson, 1867)
- Sarmientoia faustinus (Burmeister, 1878)
- Sarmientoia haywardi O. Mielke, 1967
- Sarmientoia similis O. Mielke, 1967
- Sarmientoia almeidai O. Mielke, 1967
- Sarmientoia browni O. Mielke, 1967
