= Nerula =

Scientific classification
- Kingdom: Animalia
- Phylum: Arthropoda
- Class: Insecta
- Order: Lepidoptera
- Family: Hesperiidae
- Subfamily: Eudaminae
- Tribe: Oileidini
- Subtribe: Typhedanina
- Genus: Nerula; Mabille, 1888

Genus of butterflies

Nerula is a genus of dicot skippers in the butterfly family Hesperiidae (Eudaminae).

== Species ==
There are two species recognised in the genus Nerula:

- Nerula fibrena (Hewitson, 1877) - Venezuela, Brazil (Amazonas), Colombia.
- Nerula tuba Evans, 1953 - Brazil (Pará)
