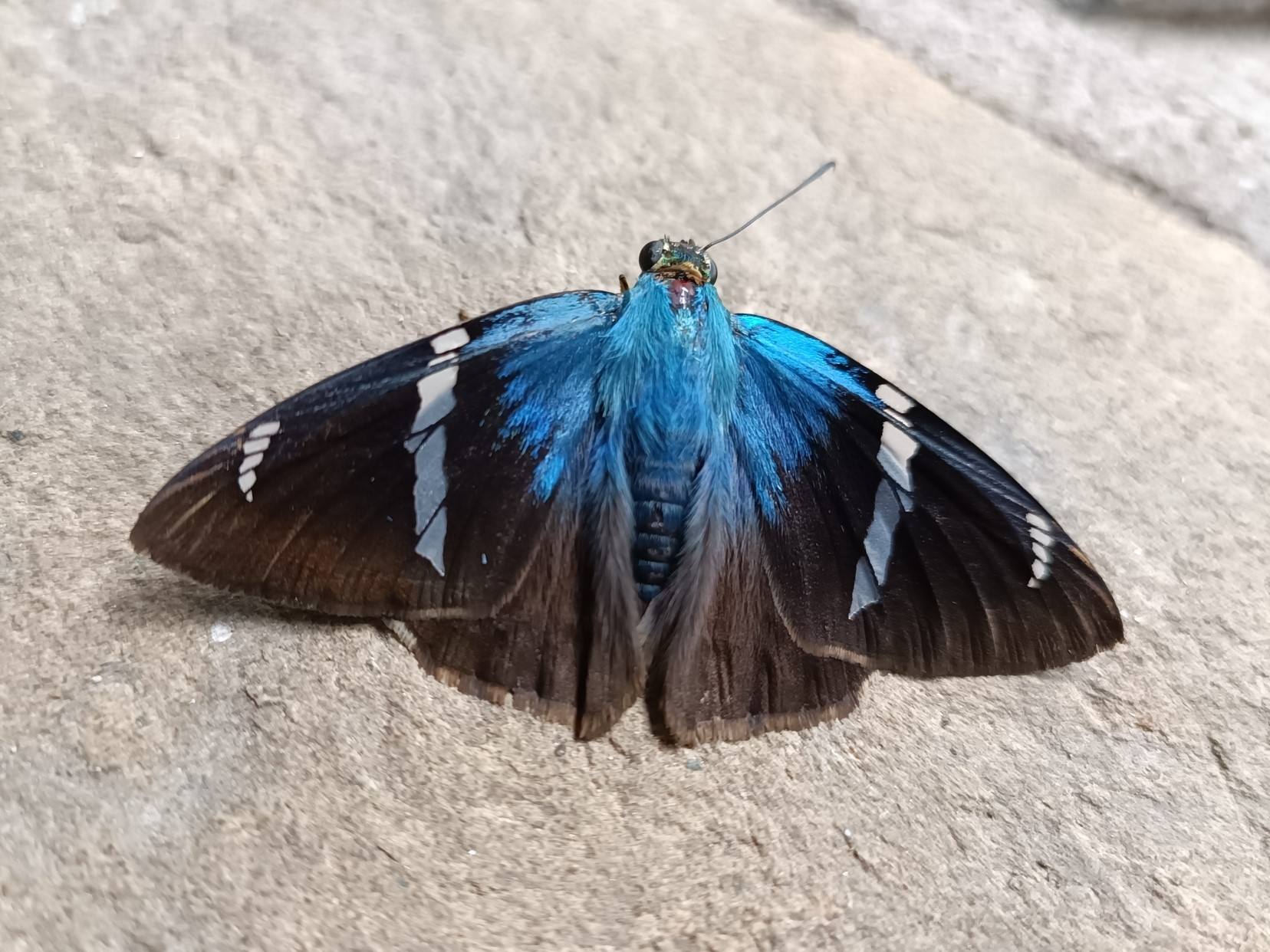
- Telegonus azul

Scientific classification
- Kingdom: Animalia
- Phylum: Arthropoda
- Class: Insecta
- Order: Lepidoptera
- Family: Hesperiidae
- Subtribe: Eudamina
- Genus: Telegonus; Hübner, [1819]

= Telegonus (skipper) =

Genus of butterflies

Telegonus is a genus of skippers in the family Hesperiidae, in which it is placed in subtribe Eudamina. It has been the subject of recent revision, and now includes several species formerly in Astraptes, Autochton and Urbanus.

== Species ==
Recognised species in the genus Telegonus include:

- Telegonus cassander Fabricius, 1793
- Telegonus cassius Evans, [1952]
- Telegonus cellus Boisduval & Le Conte, [1837]
- Telegonus cretellus (Herrich-Schäffer, 1869)
- Telegonus galesus Mabille, 1888
- Telegonus subflavus Grishin, 2022
