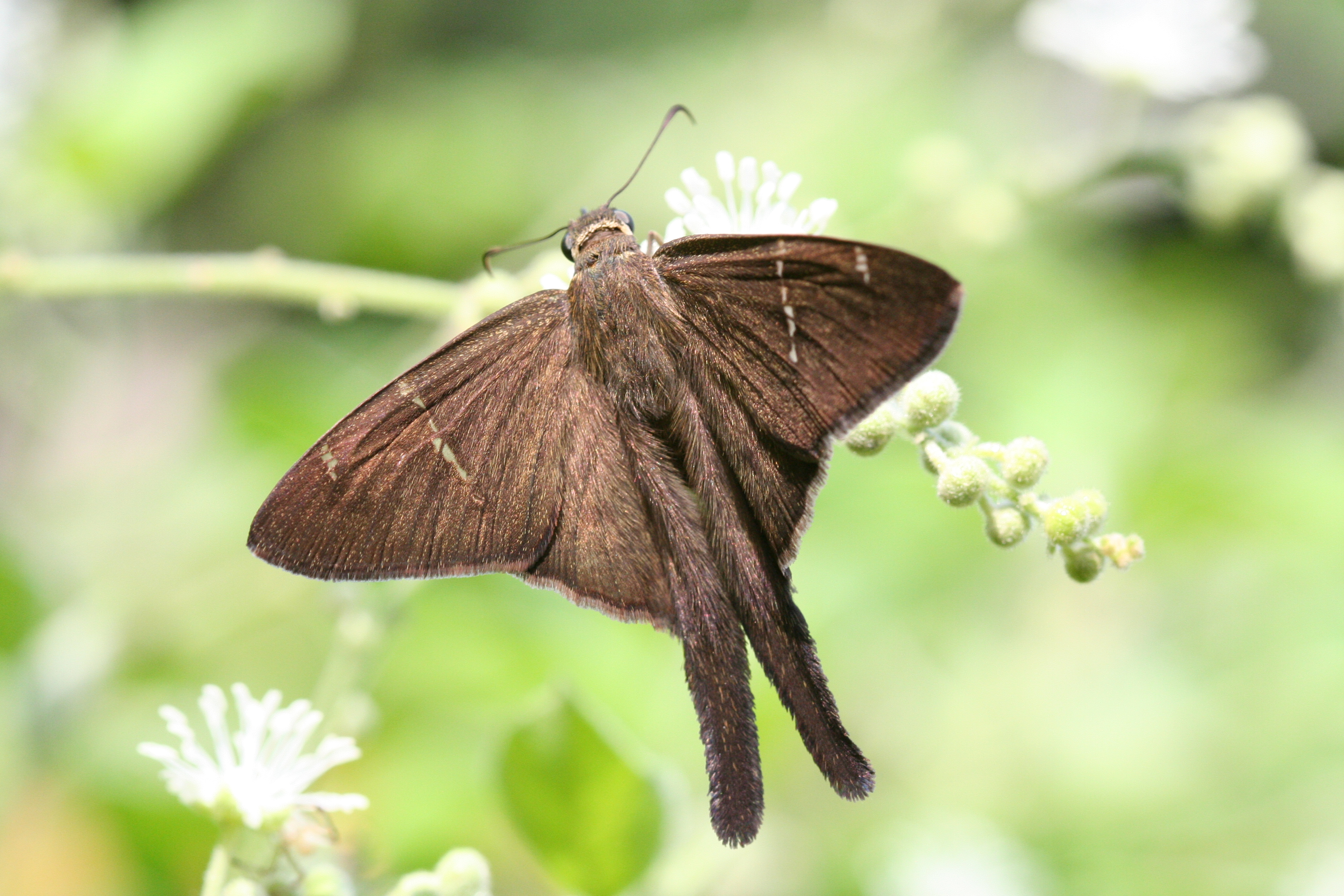
- Brown longtail (Urbanus procne)
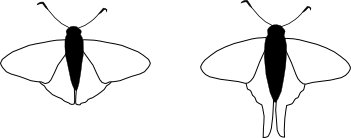
- Typical resting positions

Scientific classification
- Kingdom: Animalia
- Phylum: Arthropoda
- Clade: Pancrustacea
- Class: Insecta
- Order: Lepidoptera
- Family: Hesperiidae
- Subfamily: Eudaminae; Mabille, 1877

= Eudaminae =

Subfamily of butterflies

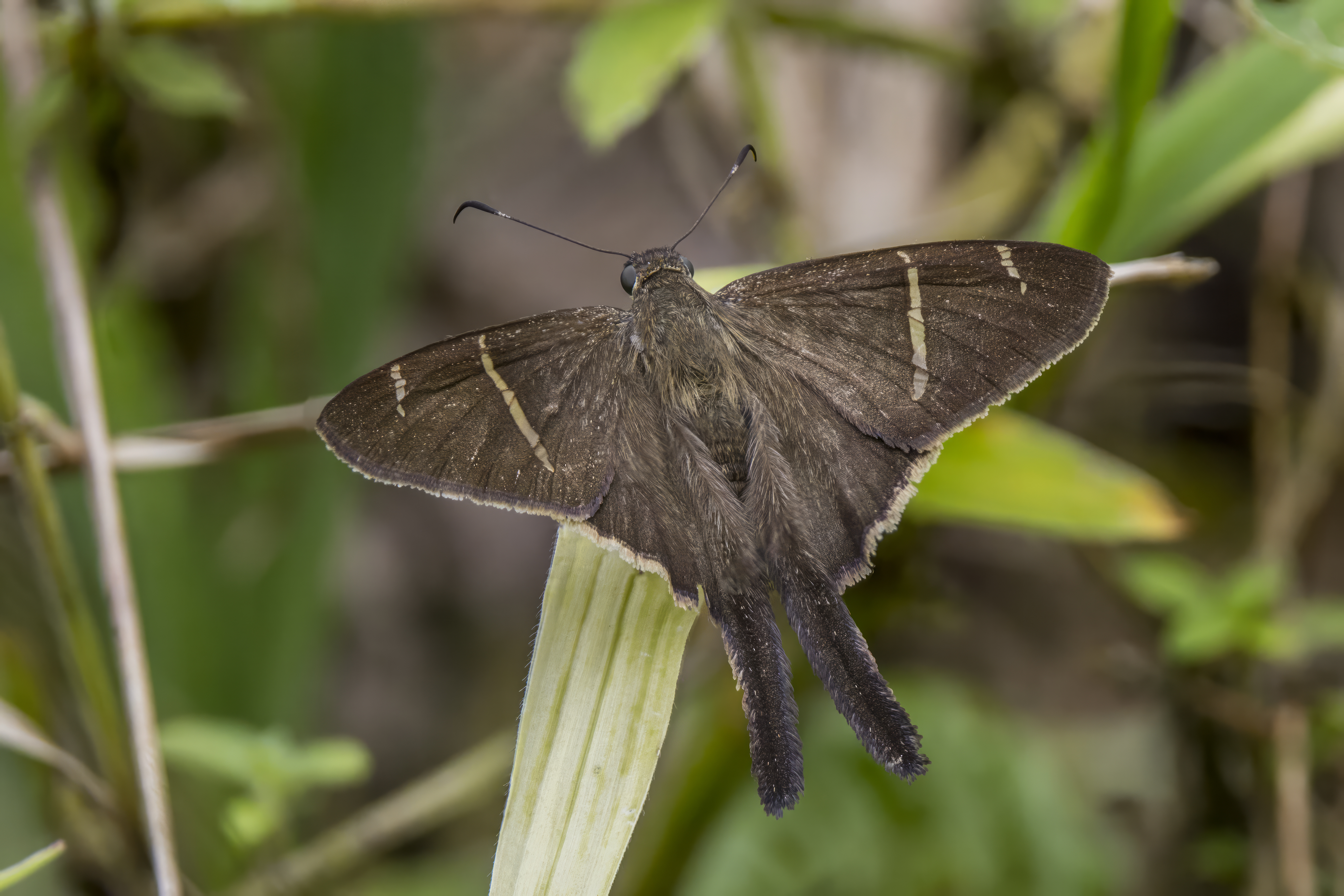
Spicauda tanna, Colombia

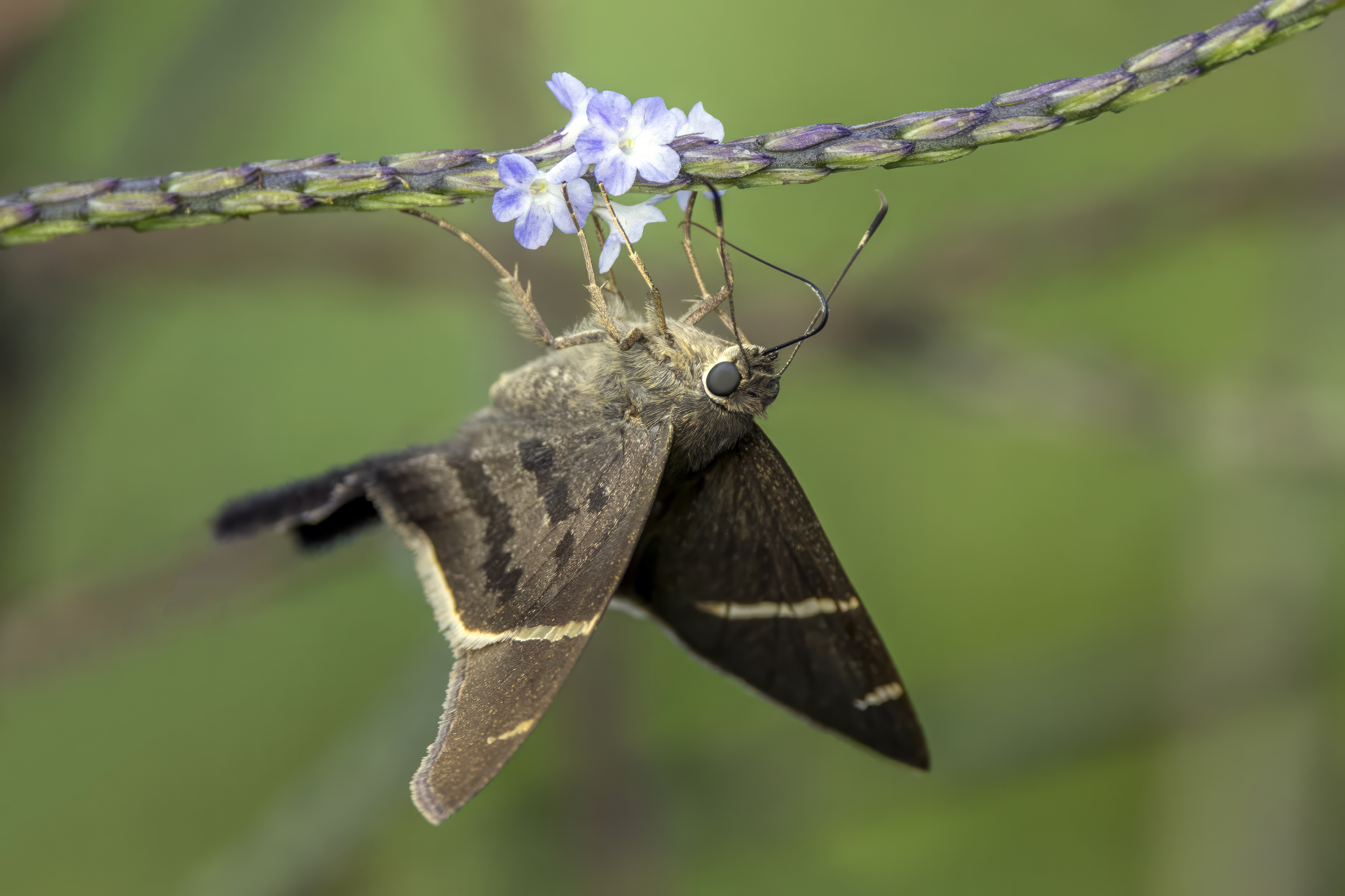
Spicauda tanna, Colombia

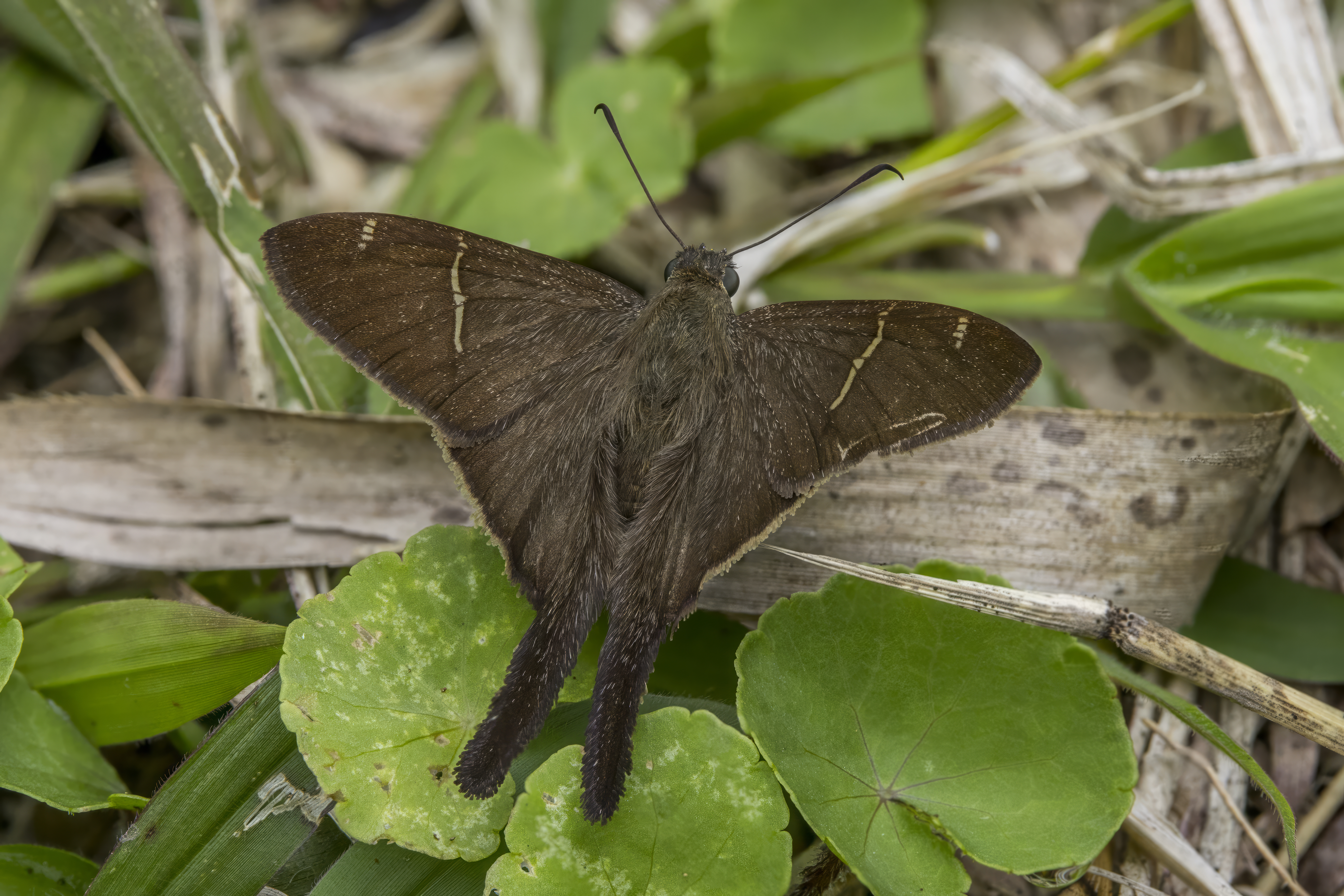
Spicauda teleus, Colombia

The Eudaminae are a subfamily of skipper butterflies (family Hesperiidae). Their original type genus Eudamus is today a junior synonym of Urbanus. They are largely found in the Neotropics, with some extending into temperate North America, and one genus, Lobocla, endemic to East Asia. Some species in several genera are commonly known as flashers.

== Taxonomy ==
The Eudaminae have been recent subject to significant taxonomic revisions based on genome analysis, including by Brower & Warren 2009, and Li et al. 2019.

Historically, the subfamily has been included as tribe Eudamini in subfamily Pyrginae, based on perceived similarities with two of the tribes in that subfamily, the Celaenorrhinini and Pyrgini. As of Li et al. 2019, the Eudaminae are divided into four tribes: Entheini, Phocidini, Eudamini (Note: further divided into four subtribes: Eudamina, Loboclina, Cephisina and Telemiadina) and Oileidini. (Note: divided into two subtribes: Oileidina and Typhedanina)

== Current status and subdivisions ==
Except where otherwise noted, the classification below follows Li et al., 2019:

=== Tribe Entheini ===
- Drephalys Watson, 1893
- Udranomia A. Butler, 1870
- Phanus Hübner, [1819]
- Hyalothyrus Mabille, 1878
- Entheus Hübner, [1819]
- Augiades Hübner, [1819]
- Tarsoctenus E. Watson, 1893

=== Tribe Phocidini ===
- Phocides Hübner, [1819]
- Pseudonascus Austin, 2008
- Nascus E. Watson, 1893
- Aurina Evans, 1937
- Emmelus O. Mielke & Casagrande, 2016
- Porphyrogenes E. Watson, 1893
- Nicephellus Austin, 2008
- Salatis Evans, 1952
- Salantoia Grishin, 2019
- Sarmientoia Berg, 1897
- Bungalotis E. Watson, 1893
- Euriphellus Austin, 2008
- Dyscophellus Godman & Salvin, 1893
- Phareas Westwood, 1852
- Ornilius Grishin, 2022
- Fulvatis Grishin, 2022
- Adina Grishin, 2022

=== Tribe Eudamini ===
==== Subtribe Eudamina ====
- Cecropterus Herrich-Schäffer, 1869
- Spicauda Grishin, 2019
- Urbanus Hübner, [1807]
- Telegonus Hübner, [1819]
- Autochton Hübner, 1823
- Spathilepia A. Butler, 1870
- Astraptes Hübner, [1819]
- Narcosius Steinhauser, 1986
- Proteides Hübner, [1819]
- Epargyreus Hübner, [1819]
- Chioides Lindsey, 1921

==== Subtribe Loboclina ====
- Aguna R. Williams, 1927
- Zeutus Grishin, 2019
- Lobocla Moore, 1884
- Lobotractus Grishin, 2019
- Codatractus Lindsey, 1921
- Zestusa Lindsey, 1925
- Ridens Evans, 1952
- Venada Evans, 1952

==== Subtribe Cephisina ====
- Cephise Evans, 1952

==== Subtribe Telemiadina ====
- Ectomis Mabille, 1878
- Telemiades Hübner, [1819]
- Polygonus Hübner, [1825]

=== Tribe Oileidini ===
==== Subtribe Oileidina ====
- Flattoides Grishin, 2019
- Oileides Hübner, [1825]

==== Subtribe Typhedanina ====
- Typhedanus A. Butler, 1870
- Oechydrus E. Watson, 1893
- Cogia A. Butler, 1870
- Nerula Mabille, 1888
- Marela Mabille, 1903
