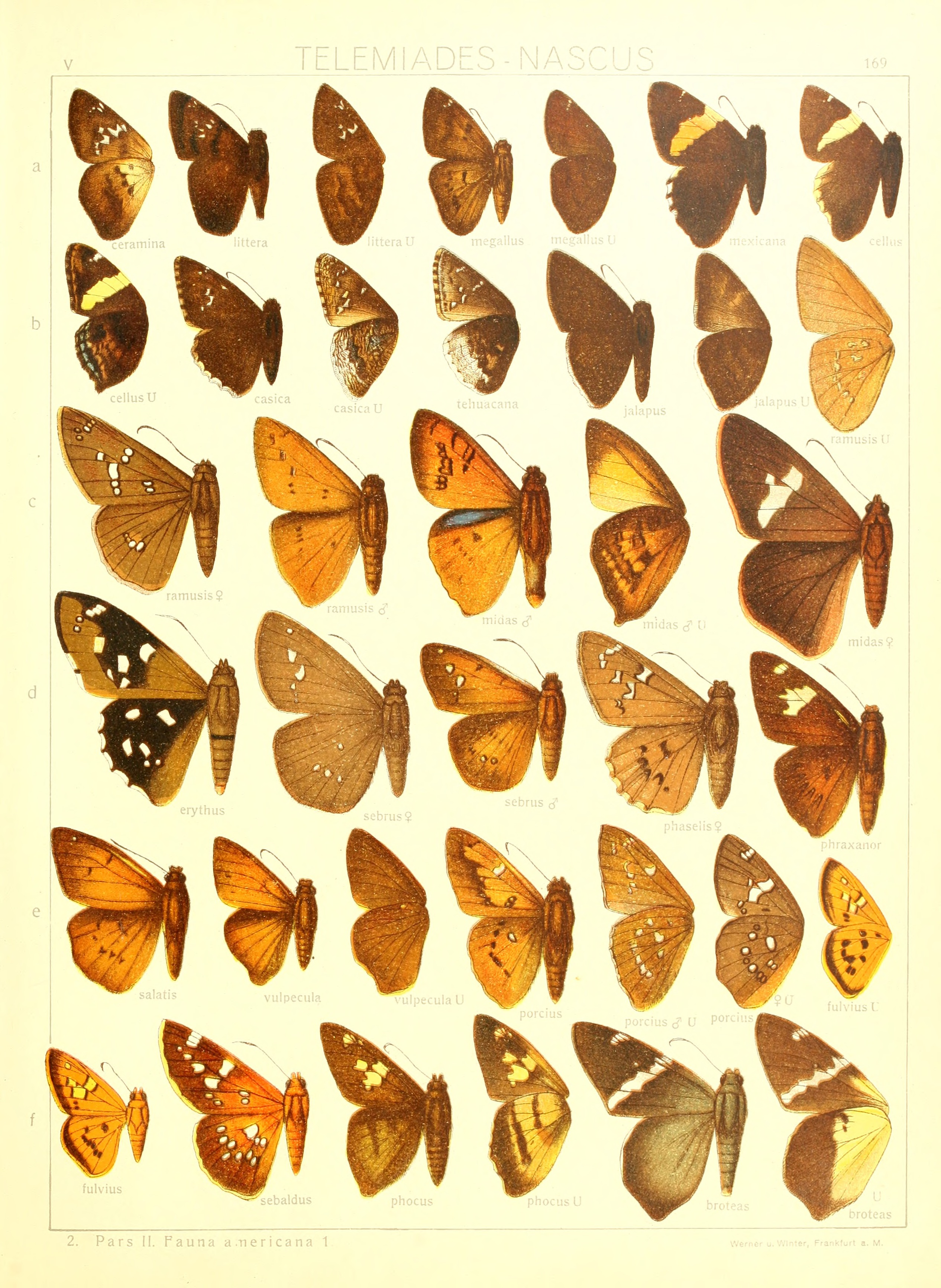
- Salatis spp. and related genera in Adalbert Seitz Macrolepidoptera of the World Vol.5 The American Rhopalocera

Scientific classification
- Kingdom: Animalia
- Phylum: Arthropoda
- Class: Insecta
- Order: Lepidoptera
- Family: Hesperiidae
- Tribe: Phocidini
- Genus: Salatis; Evans, 1952

= Salatis =

Genus of butterflies

Salatis is a Neotropical genus of spread-winged skippers in the family Hesperiidae, in which they are placed to tribe Phocidini.

Species of the genus Salatis are native to Central America and South America, including in the Amazon River basin.

== Species ==
The following species are recognised in the genus Salatis:

- Salatis canalis (Skinner, 1920)
- Salatis salatis (Stoll, 1782)
- Salatis cebrenus (Cramer, 1777)
- Salatis flavomarginatus (Sepp, [1851])
