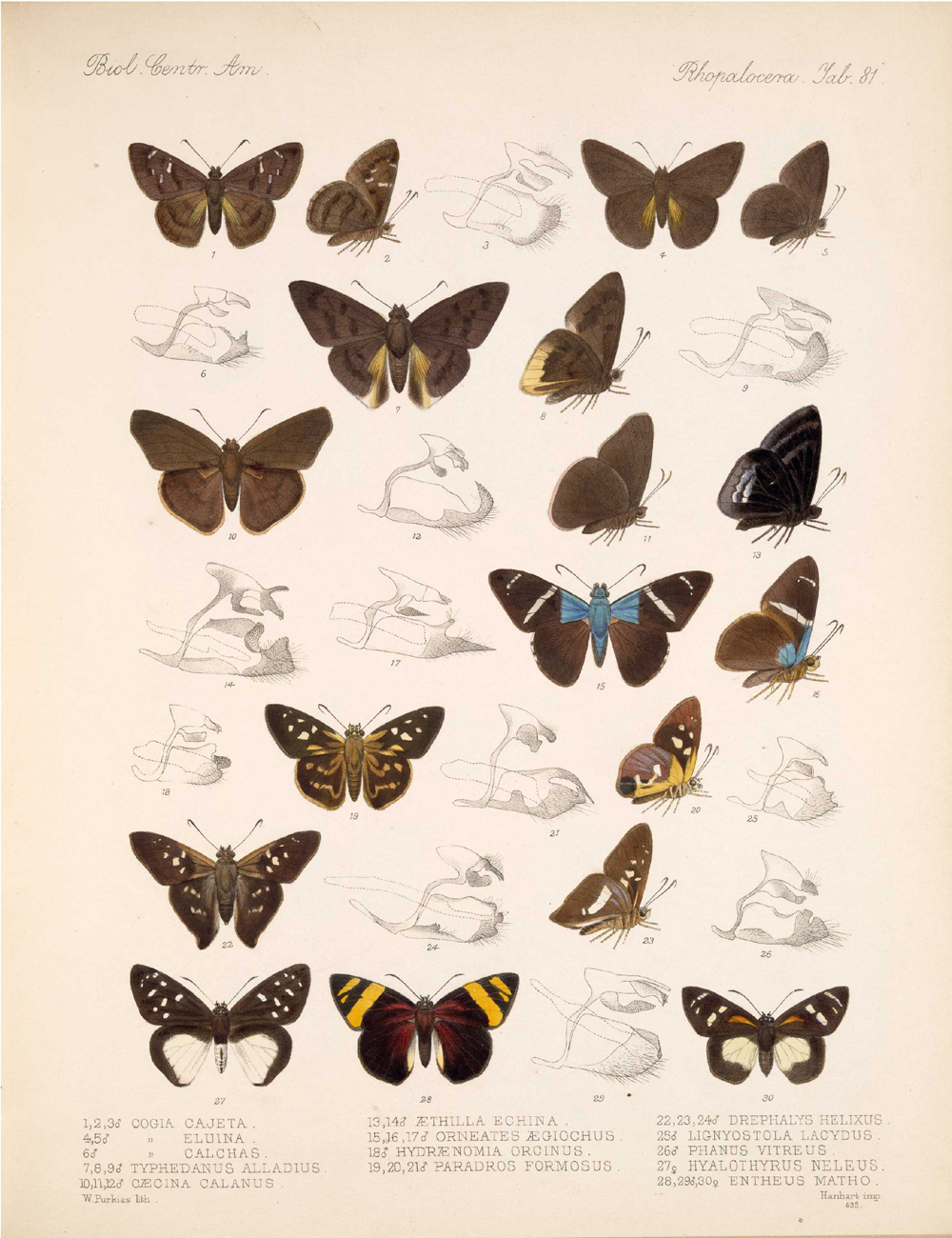
- figure 18 Udranomia orcinus

Scientific classification
- Kingdom: Animalia
- Phylum: Arthropoda
- Class: Insecta
- Order: Lepidoptera
- Family: Hesperiidae
- Tribe: Entheini
- Genus: Udranomia; Butler, 1870

Synonyms
- Hydraenomia Butler, 1870

= Udranomia =

Genus of butterflies

Udranomia is a genus of Neotropical butterflies in the family Hesperiidae, in which it is placed in tribe Entheini. It was established in 1870 by Arthur Gardiner Butler.

== Species ==
Per Li et al. 2019, the genus contains the following species:

- Udranomia eurus (Mabille & Boullet, 1919) – Venezuela
- Udranomia tomdaleyi Burns, 2017
- Udranomia sallydaleyae Burns, 2017
- Udranomia kikkawai (Weeks, 1906) – Venezuela, Mexico
- Udranomia orcinus (C. & R. Felder, [1867]) – Mexico, Brazil - type species, as Eudamus orcinus.
- Udranomia spitzi (Hayward, 1942) Brazil

== Original publication ==
Butler, Arthur Gardiner (1870). "The Genera of Hesperidae in the Collection of the British Museum". The Entomologist's Monthly Magazine. 7: 58.
