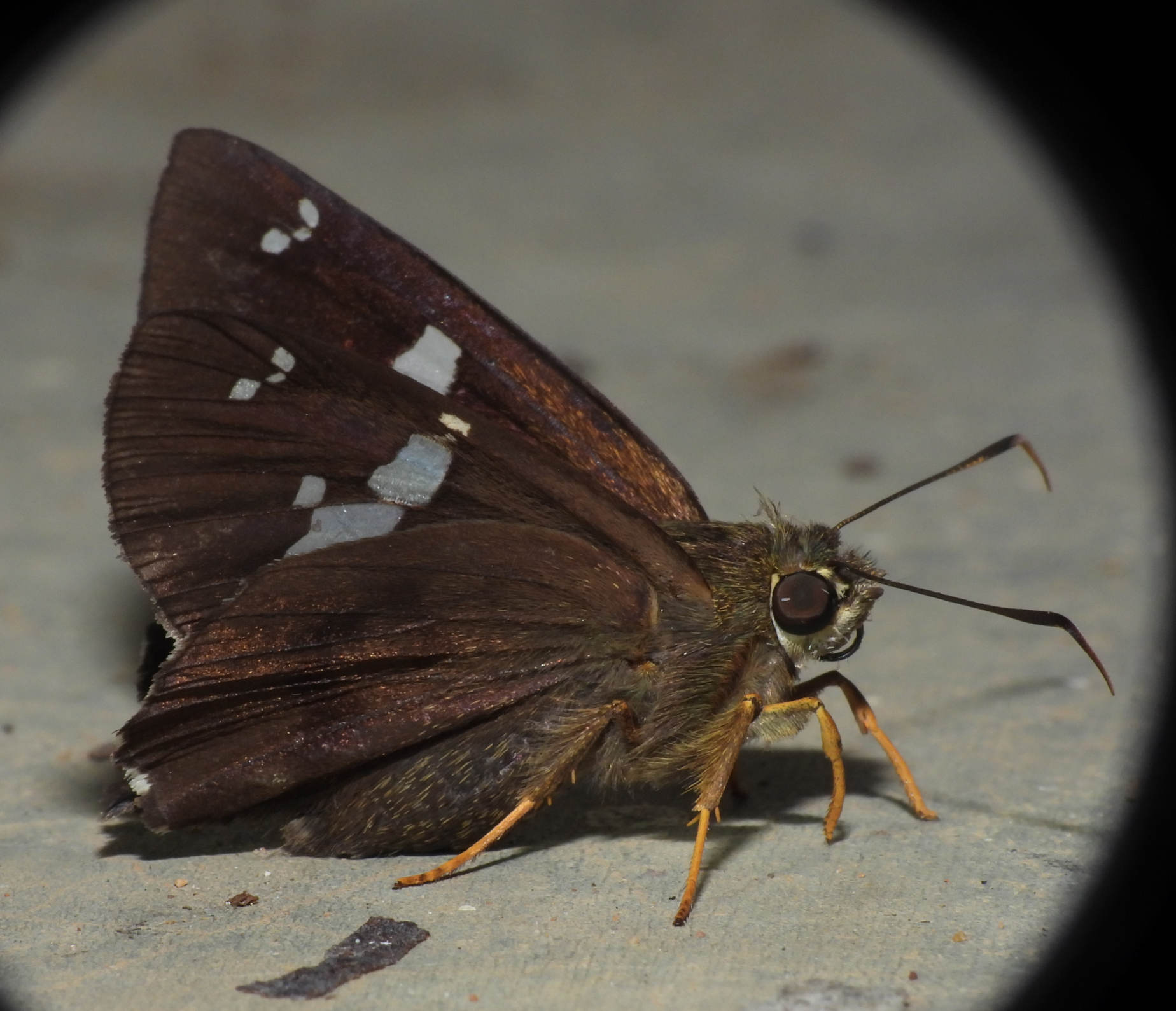
- Cephise maculatus

Scientific classification
- Kingdom: Animalia
- Phylum: Arthropoda
- Clade: Pancrustacea
- Class: Insecta
- Order: Lepidoptera
- Family: Hesperiidae
- Subtribe: Cephisina
- Genus: Cephise; Evans, 1952

= Cephise =

Genus of butterflies

Cephise is a Neotropical genus of skipper butterflies of the subfamily Eudaminae, within which it is placed in subtribe Cephisina.

== Species ==
Per Li et al. 2019, the genus contains the following species:

- Cephise aelius (Plötz, 1880) – Mexico, Guatemala, Honduras
- Cephise burnsi Austin & Mielke, 2000 – Brazil (Espírito Santo).
- Cephise callias (Mabille, 1888)
- Cephise cephise (Herrich-Schäffer, 1869) – Brazil, Peru
- Cephise glarus (Mabille, 1888) – Brazil (Pará)
- Cephise guatemalaensis (Freeman, 1977) – Guatemala, south Mexico
- Cephise impunctus Austin & Mielke, 2000 – Brazil (Rondônia)
- Cephise maculatus Austin & Mielke, 2000 – Brazil (Rondônia)
- Cephise malesedis Austin & Mielke, 2000 – Brazil (Rondônia)
- Cephise mexicanus Austin & Mielke, 2000 – Mexico
- Cephise nuspesez Burns, 1996 – Mexico, Costa Rica
- Cephise procerus (Plötz, 1880) – Brazil (Pará), Mexico to Venezuela
