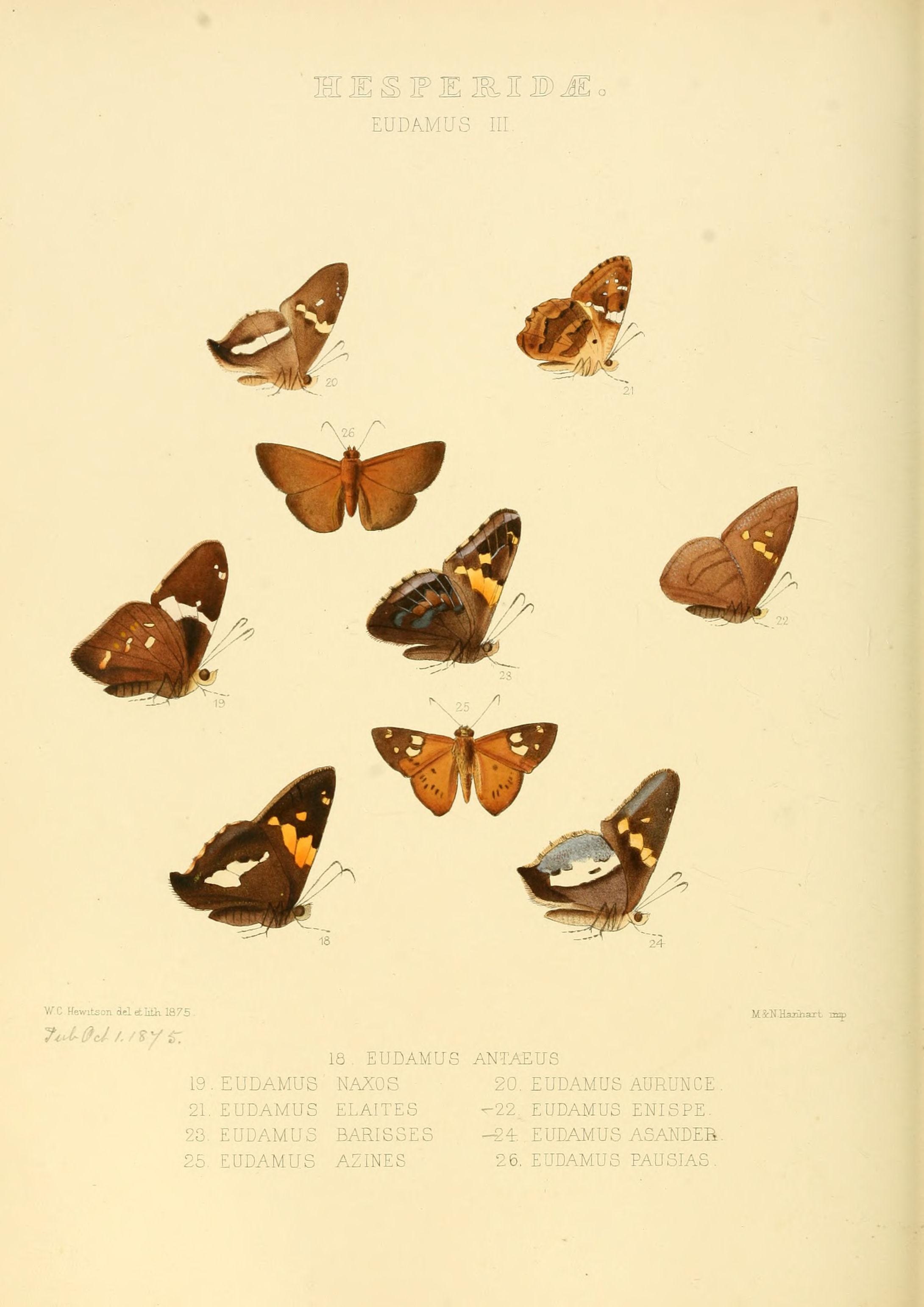
- Oileides azines figure 25

Scientific classification
- Kingdom: Animalia
- Phylum: Arthropoda
- Class: Insecta
- Order: Lepidoptera
- Family: Hesperiidae
- Subfamily: Eudaminae
- Tribe: Oileidini
- Subtribe: Oileidina
- Genus: Oileides; Hübner, [1825]

Synonyms
- Ablepsis Watson, 1893

= Oileides =

Genus of butterflies

Oileides is a genus of Neotropical spread-winged skippers in the family Hesperiidae.

== Species ==
The following species are recognised in the genus Oileides:

- Oileides fenestratus (Gmelin, [1790]) - French Guiana
- Oileides guyanensis (Mabille & Boullet, 1912) - French Guiana
- Oileides vulpinus Hübner, [1825] - Brazil
