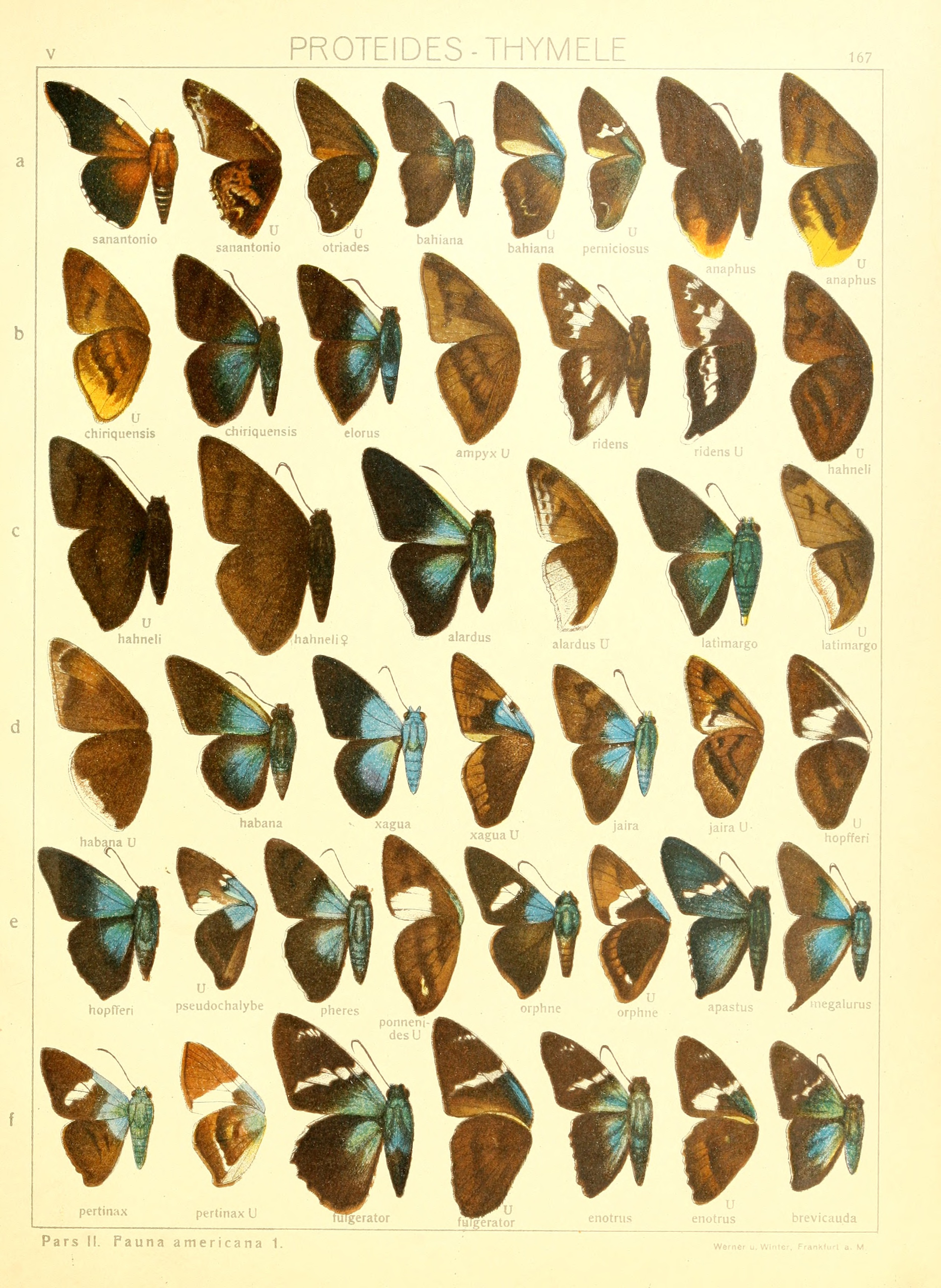
- Astraptes sp. and related genera depicted in Adalbert Seitz's Macrolepidoptera of the World

Scientific classification
- Kingdom: Animalia
- Phylum: Arthropoda
- Class: Insecta
- Order: Lepidoptera
- Family: Hesperiidae
- Subfamily: Eudaminae
- Genus: Astraptes; Hübner, [1819]

Species
- Several, see text

= Astraptes =

Flasher butterflies

Genus of butterflies

Astraptes, commonly known as the flasher butterflies, is a genus of skipper butterflies in the subfamily Eudaminae. They are found in the Nearctic and Neotropical ecozones.

== Species ==
The following species are recognised in the genus Astraptes:

- Astraptes erycina (Plötz, 1881) Brazil
- Astraptes mabillei Steinhauser, 1989 Bolivia
- Astraptes halesius (Hewitson, 1877) French Guiana, Peru
- Astraptes aulus (Plötz, 1881) Panama to Brazil
- Astraptes enotrus (Stoll, [1781]) Guiana, Guyane, Suriname, Colombia, Brazil, Peru, Trinidad
- Astraptes janeira (Schaus, 1902) Brazil, Suriname, Colombia, Paraguay
