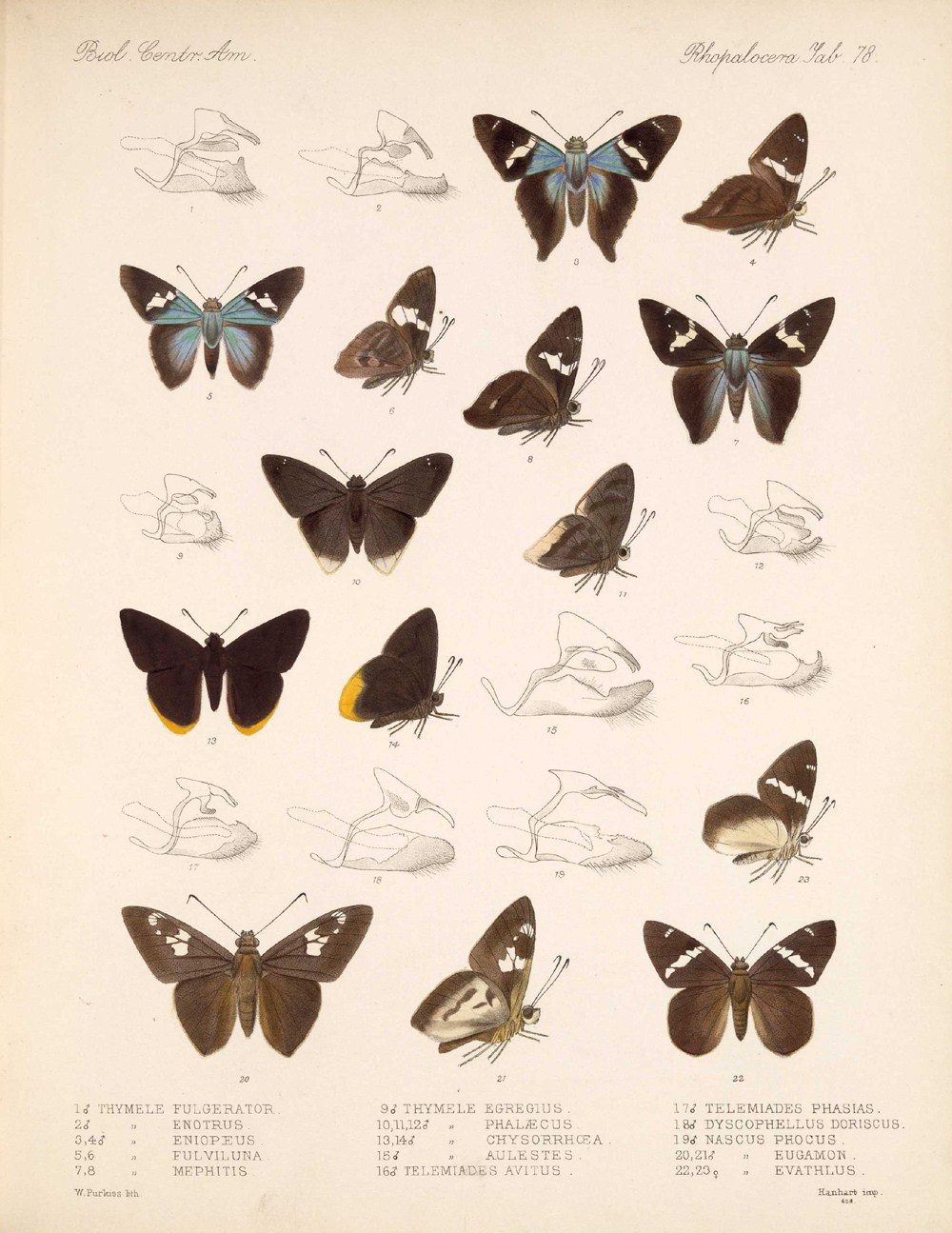
- Nascus phocus and related species in Biologia Centrali-Americana

Scientific classification
- Kingdom: Animalia
- Phylum: Arthropoda
- Clade: Pancrustacea
- Class: Insecta
- Order: Lepidoptera
- Family: Hesperiidae
- Tribe: Phocidini
- Genus: Nascus; Watson, 1893

= Nascus =

Genus of butterflies

Nascus is a genus of Neotropical butterflies in the family Hesperiidae, in which it is placed to tribe Phocidini.
