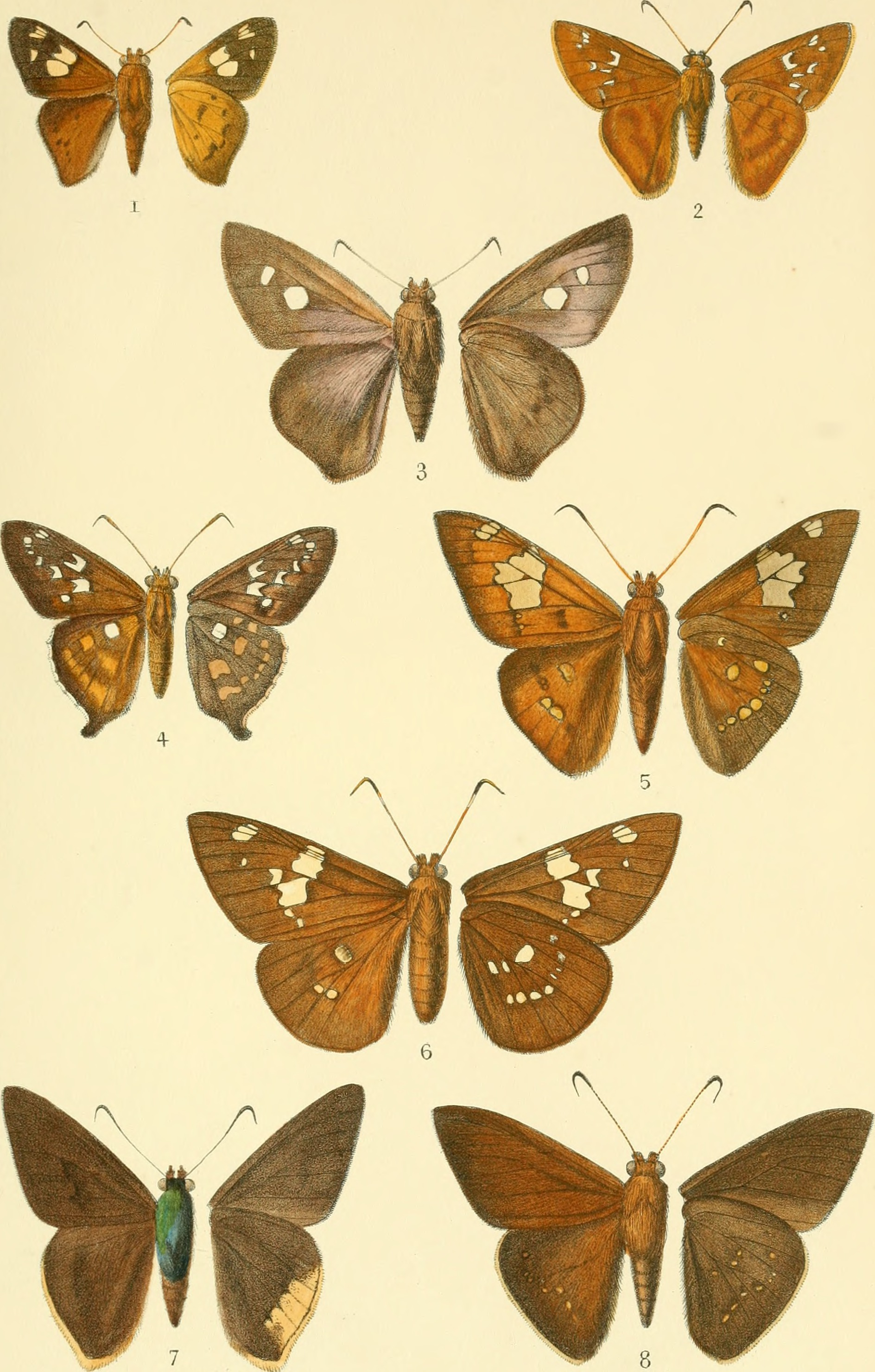
- Figure 8

Scientific classification
- Kingdom: Animalia
- Phylum: Arthropoda
- Clade: Pancrustacea
- Class: Insecta
- Order: Lepidoptera
- Family: Hesperiidae
- Genus: Nicephellus; G.T. Austin, 2008
- Species: N. nicephorus

Binomial name
- Nicephellus nicephorus (Hewitson, 1876)

Synonyms
- Eudamus nicephorus Hewitson, 1876; Dyscophellus nicephorus; Telegonus dexo Mabille, 1888

= Nicephellus =

Nicephellus nicephorus

Genus of butterflies

Nicephellus is a monotypic genus of Neotropical butterflies in the family Hesperiidae, in which it is placed in tribe Phocidini.

The sole species of the genus is Nicephellus nicephorus, also called the two-spotted scarlet-eye, and was originally described in 1876 by William Chapman Hewitson as Eudamus nicephorus. It is found from southern Mexico to Peru and western Brazil.

== Original description ==
Austin, George T. (3 March 2008). "Hesperiidae of Rondonia, Brazil: Taxonomic comments on "night" skippers, with descriptions of new genera and species (Lepidoptera: Eudaminae)". Insecta Mundi. 0029.
