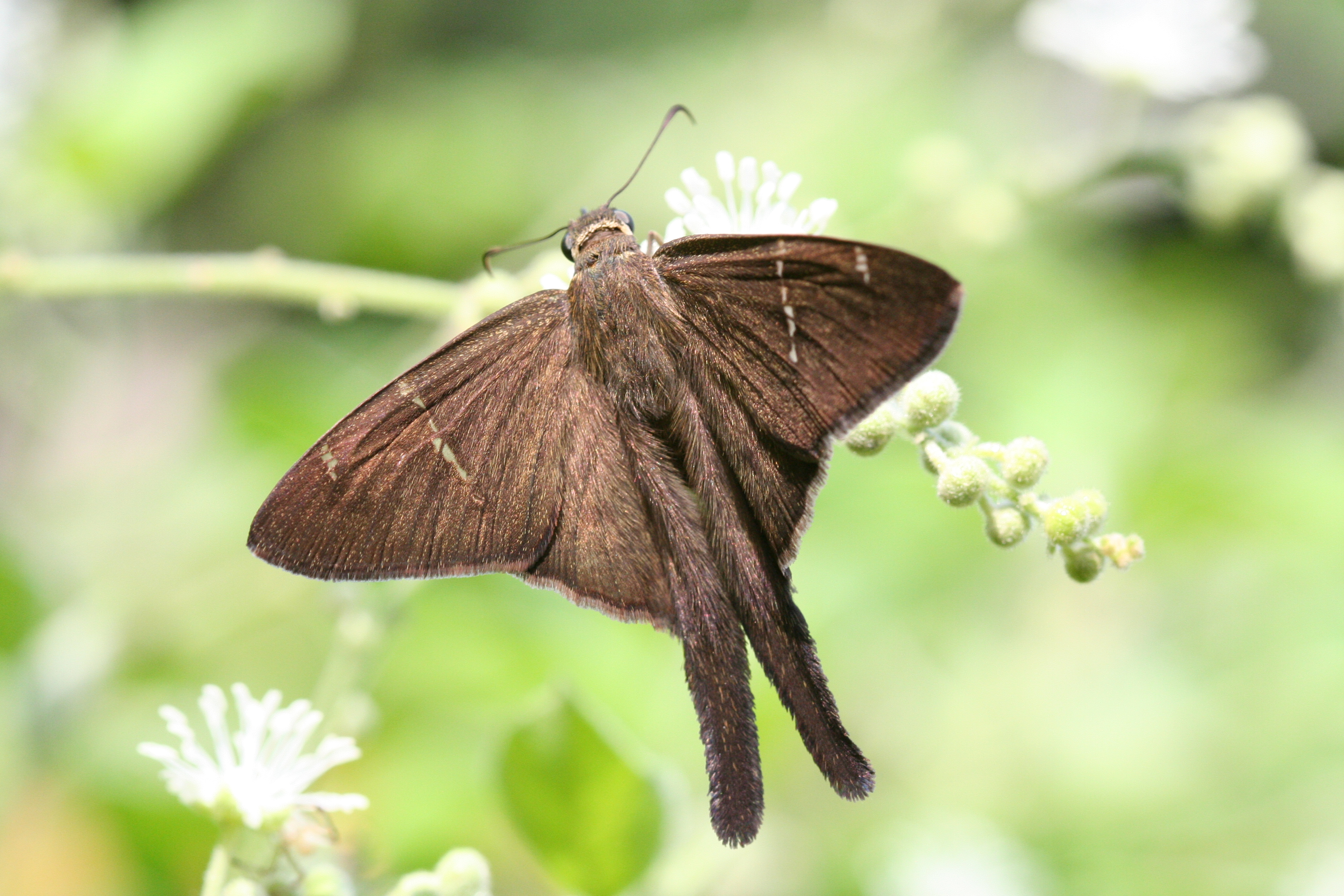

Scientific classification
- Kingdom: Animalia
- Phylum: Arthropoda
- Class: Insecta
- Order: Lepidoptera
- Family: Hesperiidae
- Genus: Spicauda
- Species: S. procne

Binomial name
- Spicauda procne (Plötz, 1880)

Synonyms
- Goniurus procne Plötz, 1880; Teleus procne (Plötz, 1880); Urbanus procne (Plötz, 1880)

= Spicauda procne =

Species of butterfly

Spicauda procne, the brown longtail, is a species of butterfly in the family Hesperiidae. It is found from Argentina, north through Central America and Mexico to southern Texas. Rare strays can be found up to southern New Mexico, southern Arizona and southern California.

The wingspan is 37–48 mm. There are three generations per year in southern Texas.

The larvae feed on various grasses, including Cynodon dactylon and Sorghum halepense.
