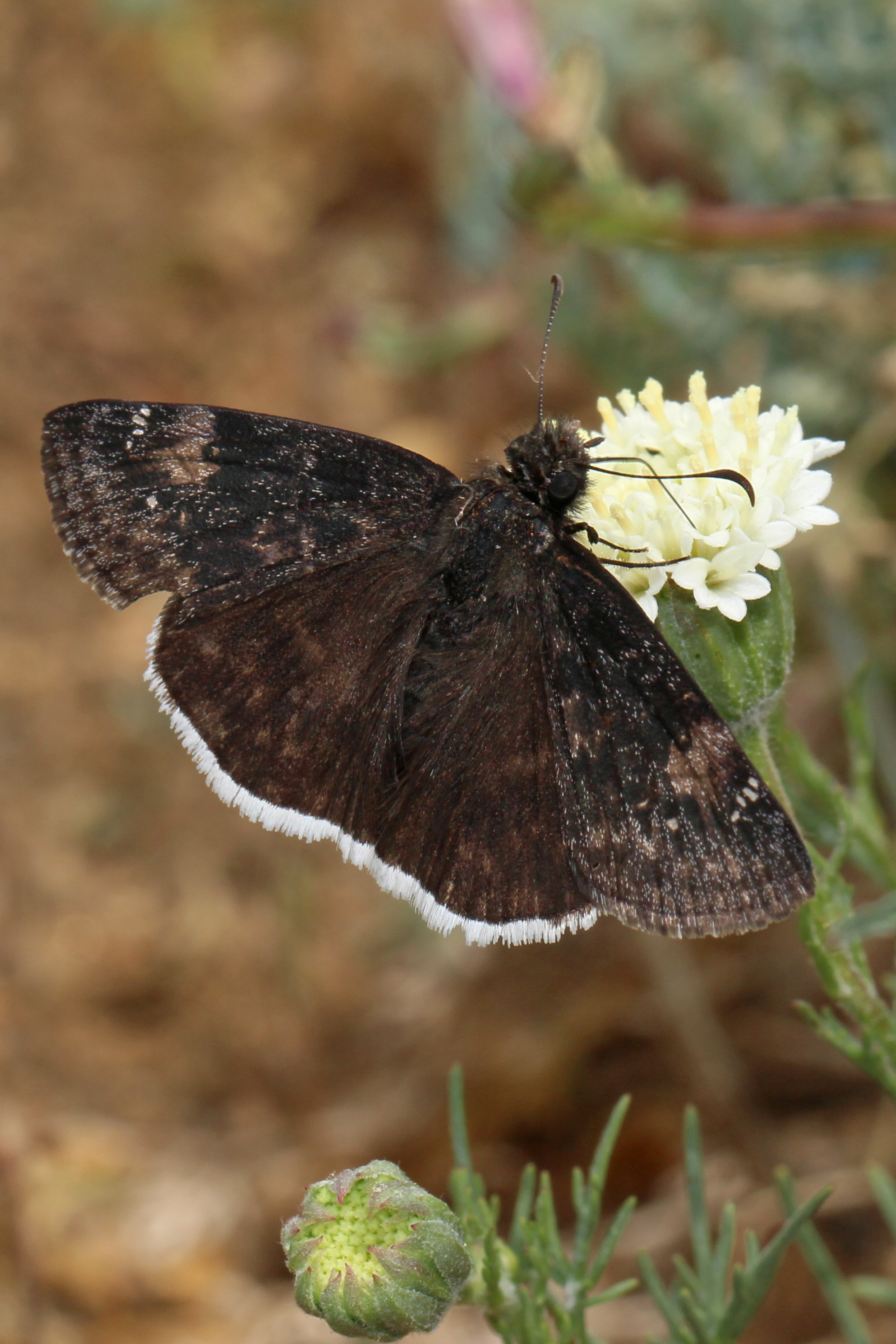
- Funereal duskywing (Erynnis funeralis)

Scientific classification
- Kingdom: Animalia
- Phylum: Arthropoda
- Class: Insecta
- Order: Lepidoptera
- Family: Hesperiidae
- Subfamily: Pyrginae
- Tribe: Erynnini; Brues & Melander, 1932

= Erynnini =

Tribe of butterflies

The Erynnini are a tribe in the skipper butterfly subfamily Pyrginae. They are a moderately diverse but quite plesiomorphic and inconspicuous group, and except for the Holarctic species of the type genus Erynnis occur only in the Neotropics.

Formerly, when only four tribes of Pyrginae were recognized, they were included in the Pyrgini, which at that time contained a massive number of genera. But the Pyrginae have since been reorganized to make them and their tribes monophyletic, leading most modern authors to treat the Erynnini as distinct tribe. However, the old circumscription of the Pyrgini was by and large just as correct from a phylogenetic perspective.

The tribe of the Pyrgini sensu lato most closely related to the Pyrgini sensu stricto are the strikingly different Achlyodidini. As many consider it desirable to treat this lineage as a distinct tribe, the Erynnini naturally need to be considered distinct too.

== Genera ==
The genera are listed here in the presumed phylogenetic sequence:

Subtribe Clitina
Subtribe Erynnina

- Anastrus
- Chiomara
- Sostrata
- Potamanaxas
- Gorgythion
- Anaxas
- Chiothion
- Crenda
- Echelatus
- Festivia
- Hoodus
- Tolius

Unplaced taxa

- Grais – hermit skipper
- Erynnis – duskywings
- Gesta
- Mylon
- Ebrietas
- Timochares
- Cycloglypha
- Ephyriades Hübner, [1819]
- Tosta
- Theagenes
- Helias
- Camptopleura
