= Papilio arcas =

The name Papilio arcas has been applied by authors to several different species of butterfly:

- Papilio arcas Drury, 1773 now referred to Ephyriades arcas (Hesperiidae)
- Papilio arcas Rottemburg, 1775 now referred to Phengaris nausithous (Lycaenidae)
- Papilio arcas Cramer, 1777 now referred to Pandemos pasiphae (Riodinidae)
- Papilio arcas Stoll, 1782 now referred to Parides eurimedes eurimedes (Papilionidae)
- Papilio arcas Fabricius, 1787 now referred to Lycaena orus (Lycaenidae)
