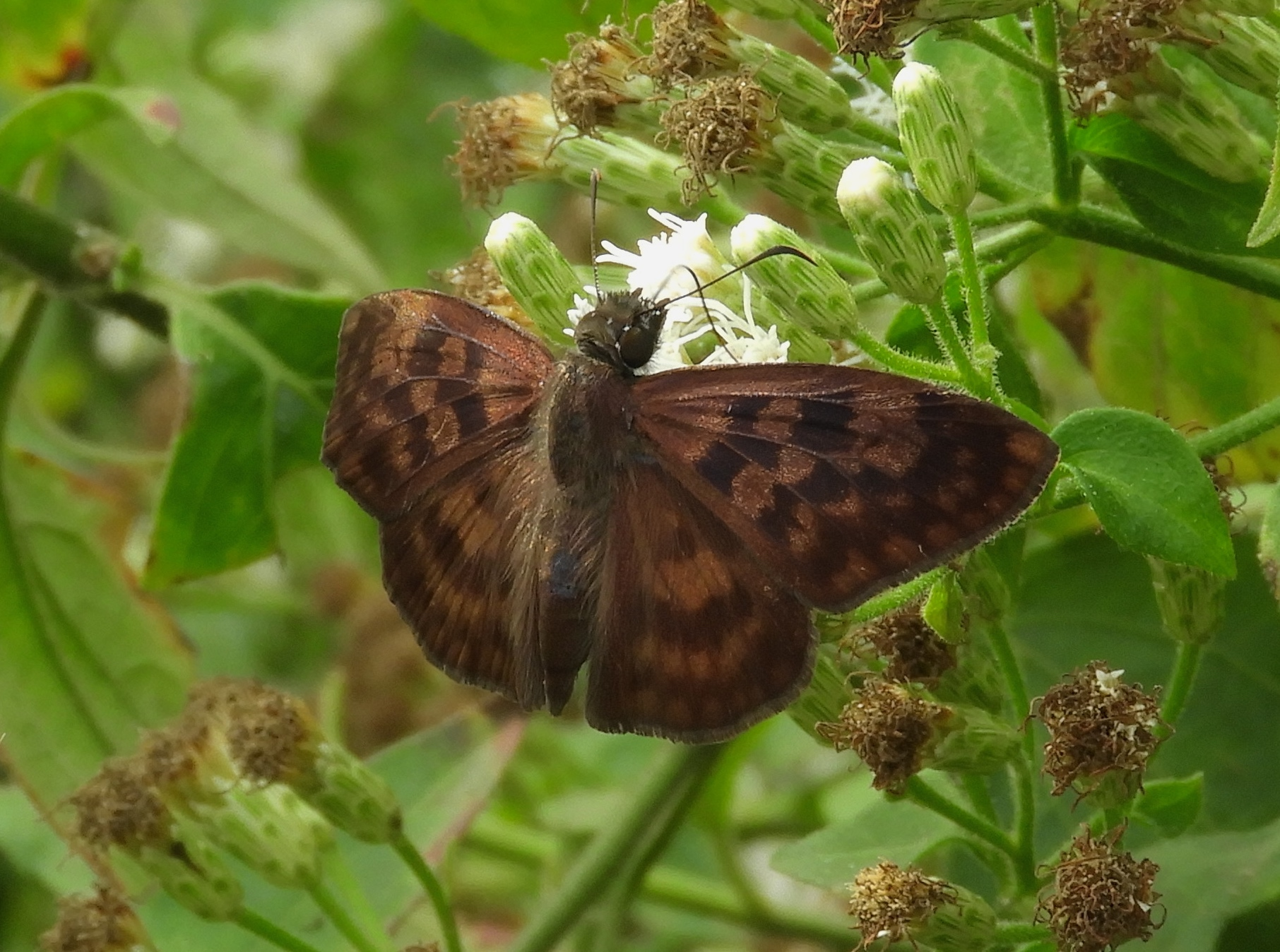
- Anastrus sempiternus

Scientific classification
- Kingdom: Animalia
- Phylum: Arthropoda
- Class: Insecta
- Order: Lepidoptera
- Family: Hesperiidae
- Tribe: Erynnini
- Genus: Anastrus; Hübner, [1824]

= Anastrus =

Genus of butterflies

Anastrus is a genus of skippers in the family Hesperiidae.

== Species ==
The following species are recognised in the genus Anastrus:

- Anastrus luctuosus
- Anastrus meliboea
- Anastrus neaeris
- Anastrus obscurus
- Anastrus peruvianus
- Anastrus tolimus
- Anastrus ulpianus
- Anastrus virens

=== Former species ===
- Anastrus sempiternus (Butler and Druce, 1872) - transferred to Echelatus sempiternus (Butler and Druce, 1872)
