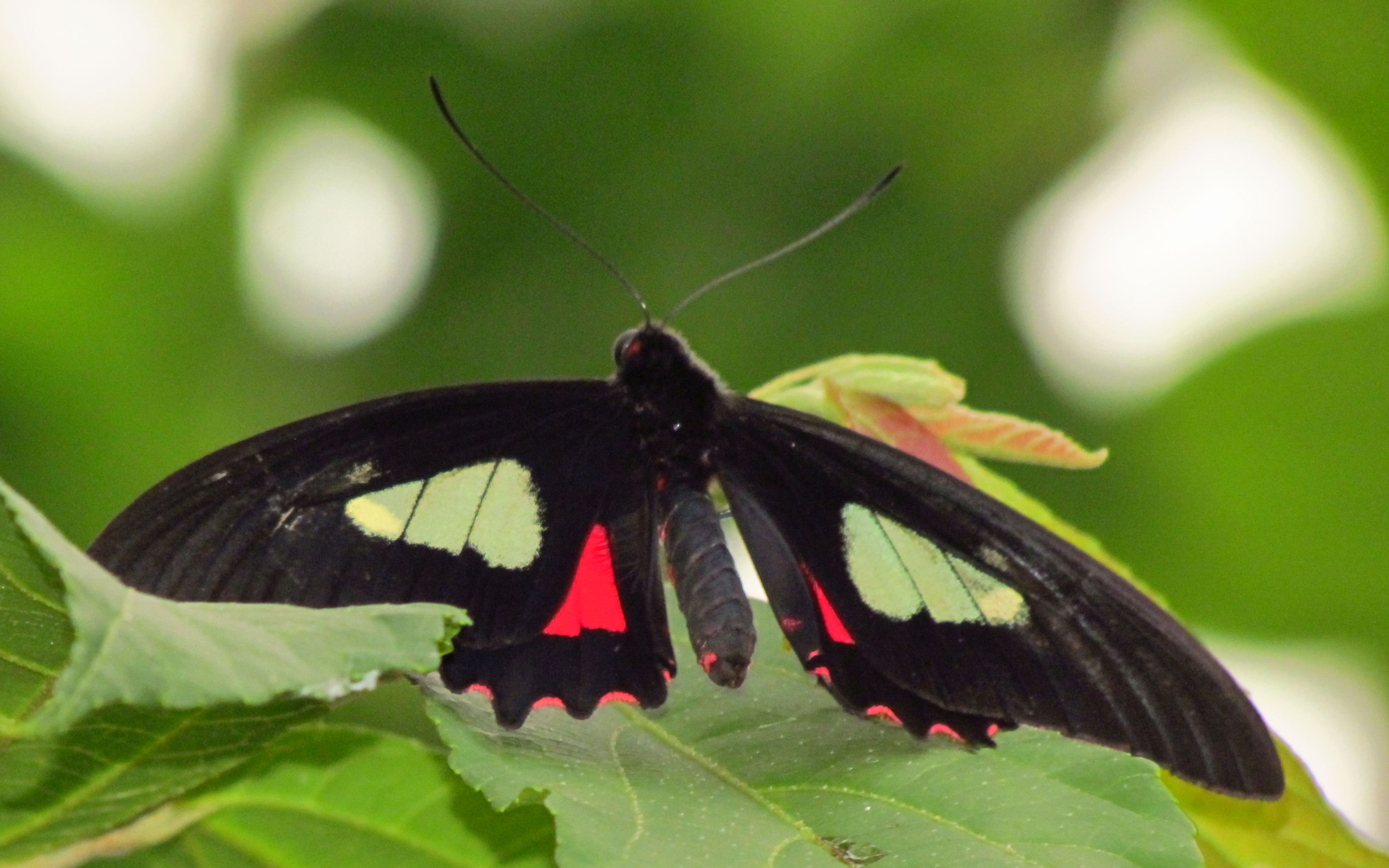
- Male
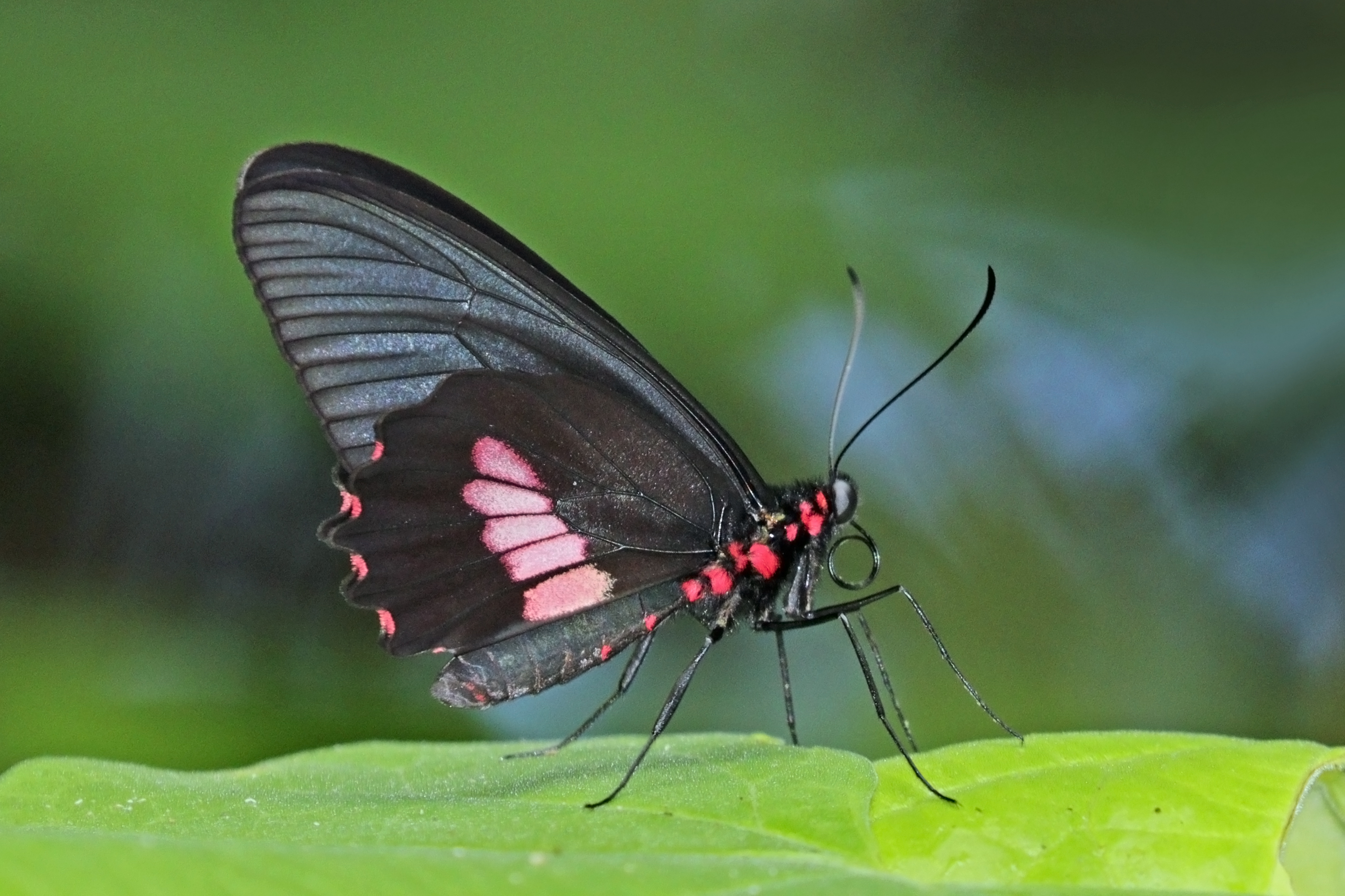
- male, P. e. mylotes, Costa Rica

Scientific classification
- Kingdom: Animalia
- Phylum: Arthropoda
- Class: Insecta
- Order: Lepidoptera
- Family: Papilionidae
- Genus: Parides
- Species: P. eurimedes

Binomial name
- Parides eurimedes (Stoll, 1782)

Synonyms
- Papilio eurimedes Stoll, 1782; Papilio arcas Stoll, 1781 non Drury, 1773 (preoccupied)

= Parides eurimedes =

Mylotes cattleheart

Species of butterfly

Parides eurimedes is a species of butterfly in the family Papilionidae. It is commonly known as the mylotes cattleheart, Arcas cattleheart, pink-checked cattleheart, and true cattleheart. It is native to the Americas.

== Subspecies ==
In 2004, Gerardo Lamas combined Parides arcas and Parides timias into Parides eurimedes. He lists the following subspecies:

- P. e. eurimedes (Stoll, 1782) (northern Colombia and northern Venezuela)
- P. e. agathokles (Kollar, 1850) (Colombia)
- P. e. antheas (Rothschild & Jordan, 1906) (Colombia)
- P. e. arriphus (Boisduval, 1836) (central Colombia)
- P. e. emilius Constantino, 1999 (western Colombia)
- P. e. mycale (Godman & Salvin, 1890) (Panama to northern Colombia)
- P. e. mylotes (H.W. Bates, 1861) (southern Mexico to Costa Rica)
- P. e. timias (Gray, [1853]) (western Ecuador)
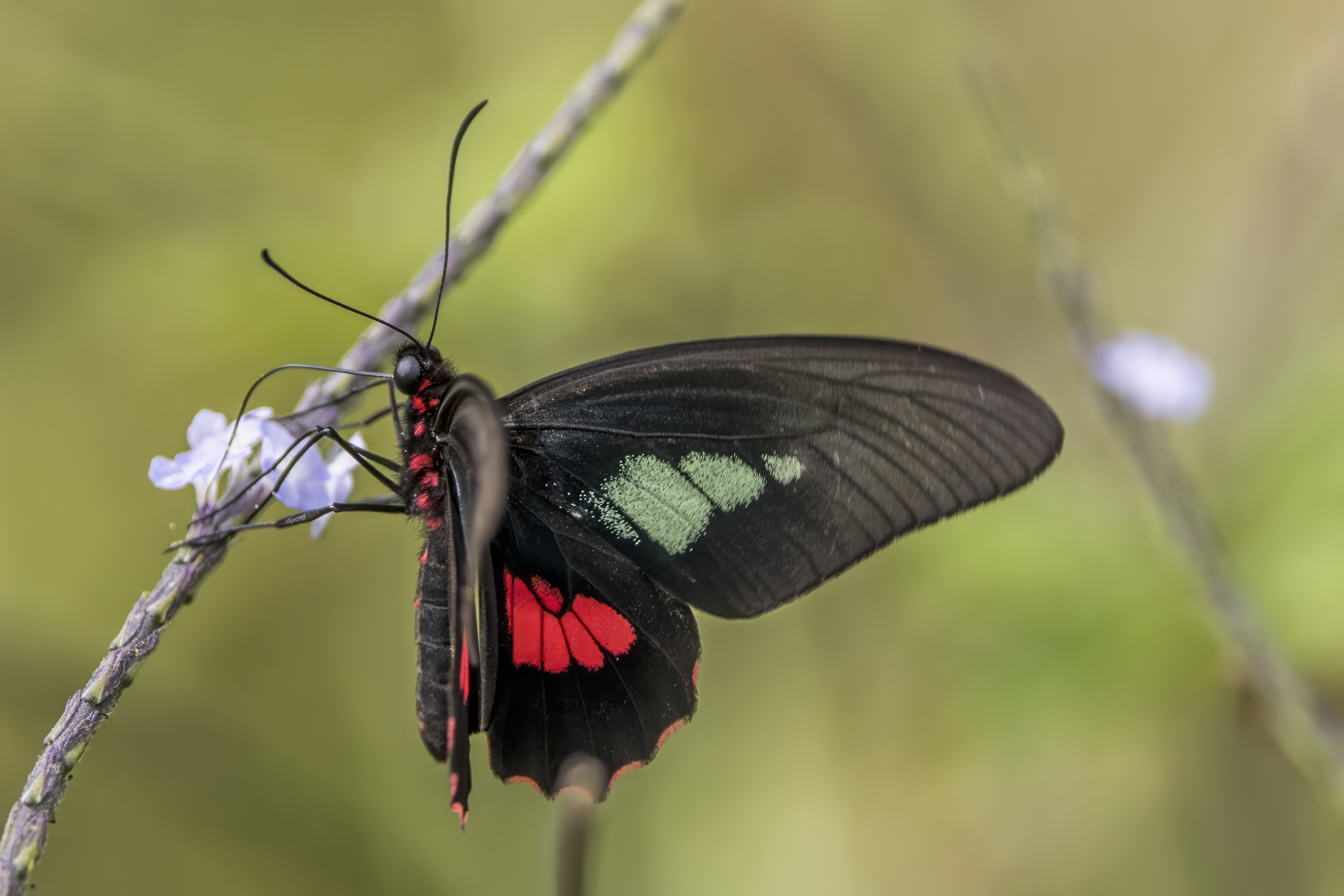
male P. e. timias
Colombia

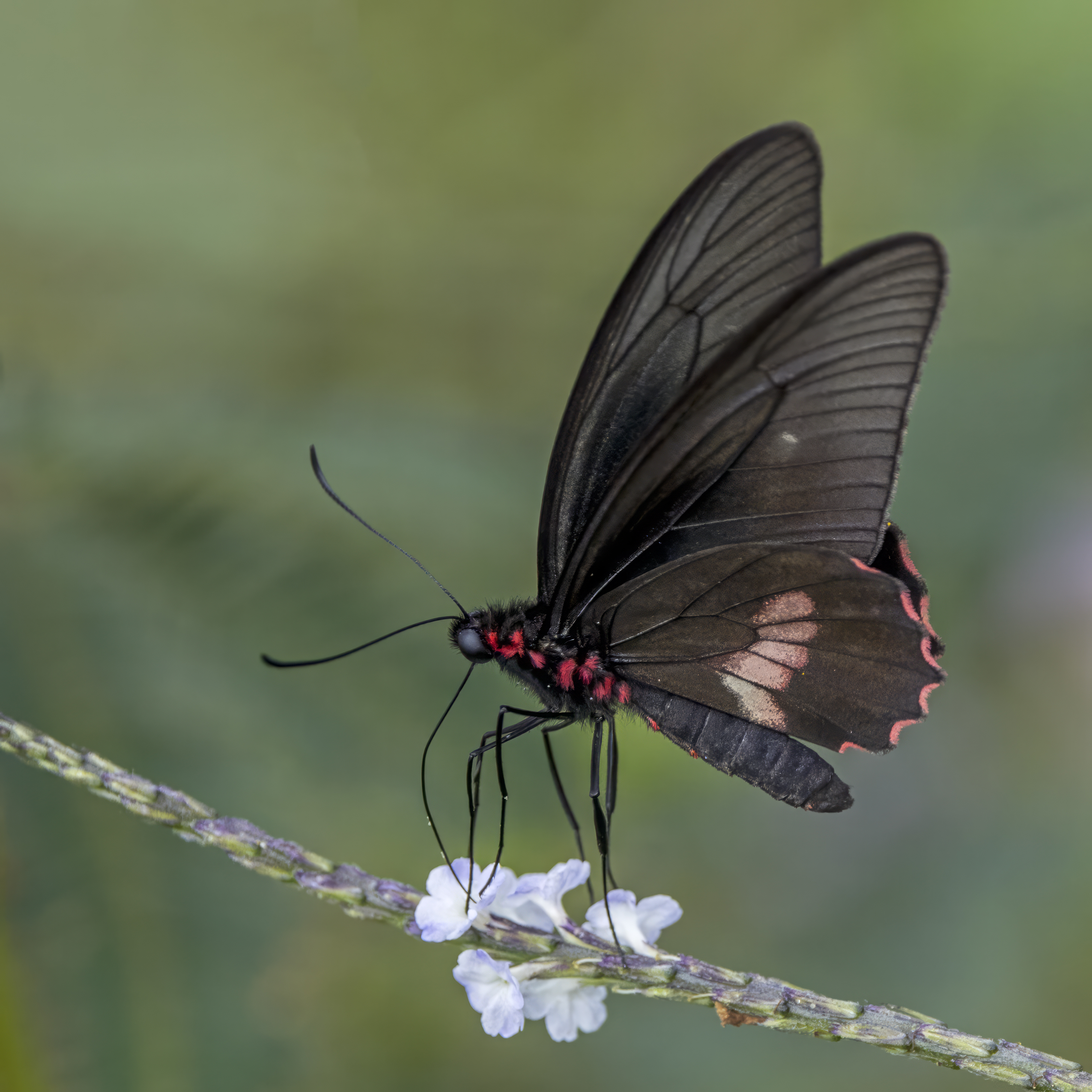
male P. e. timias
Colombia

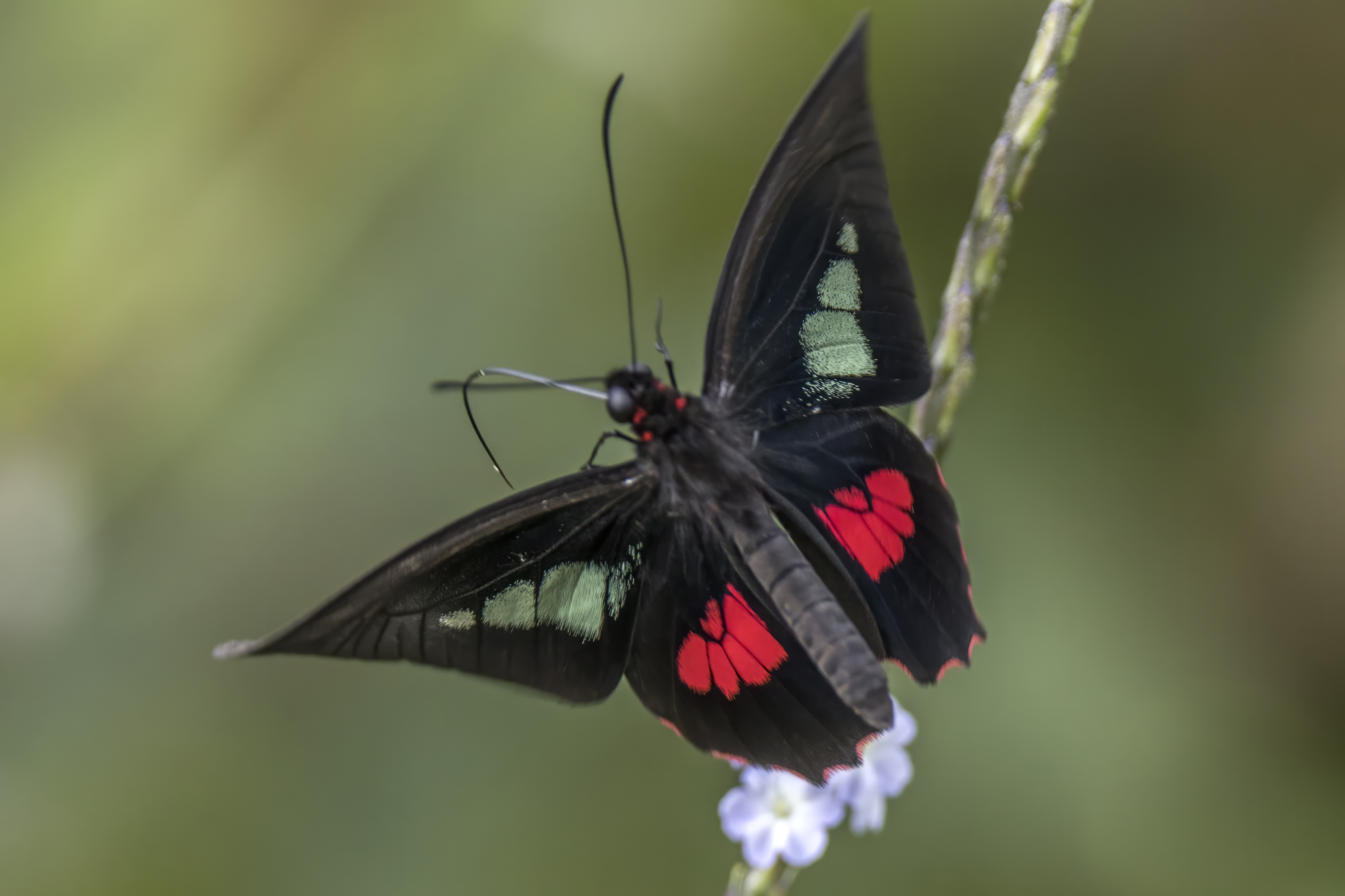
male P. e. timias
Colombia

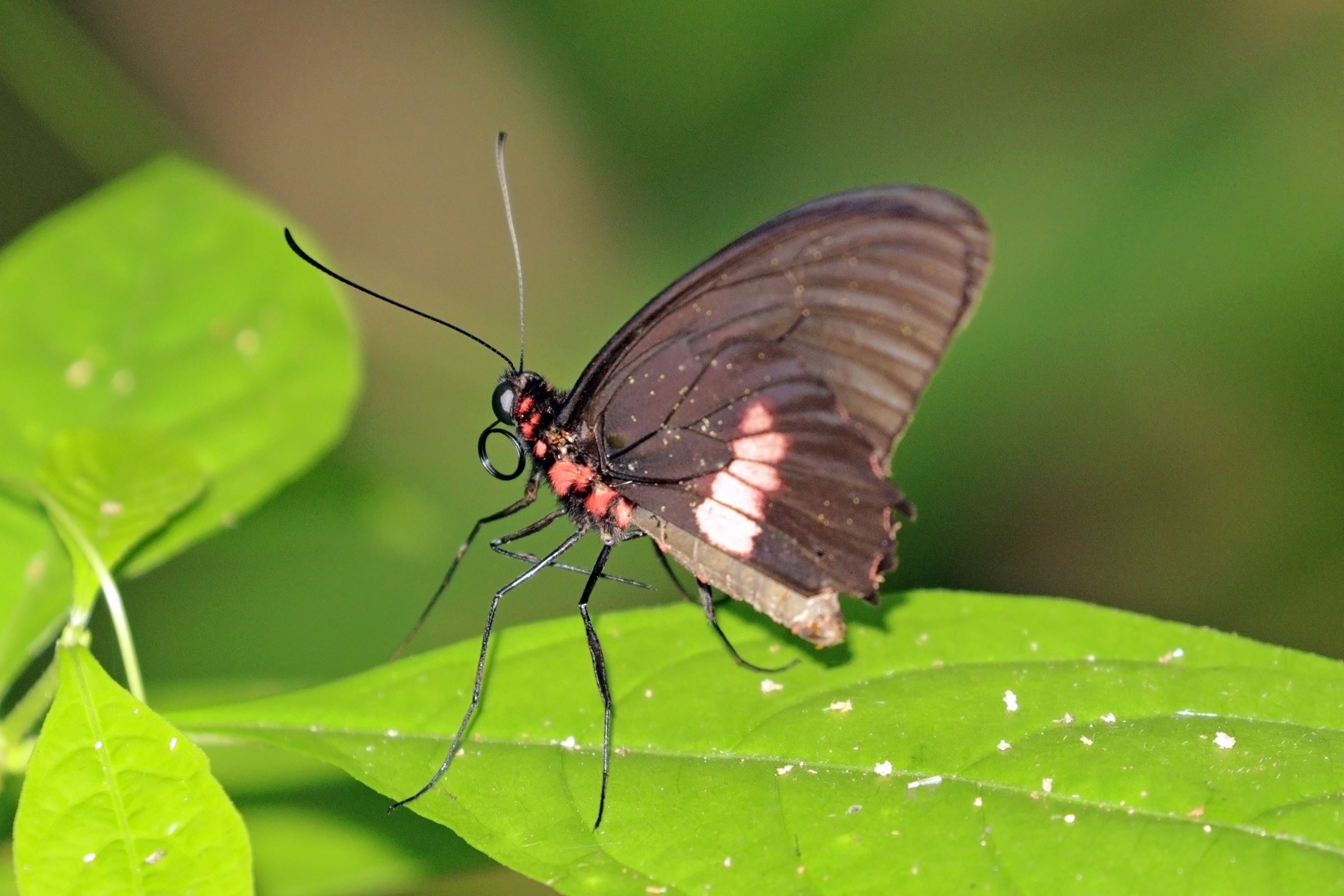
male P. e. mycale
Panama

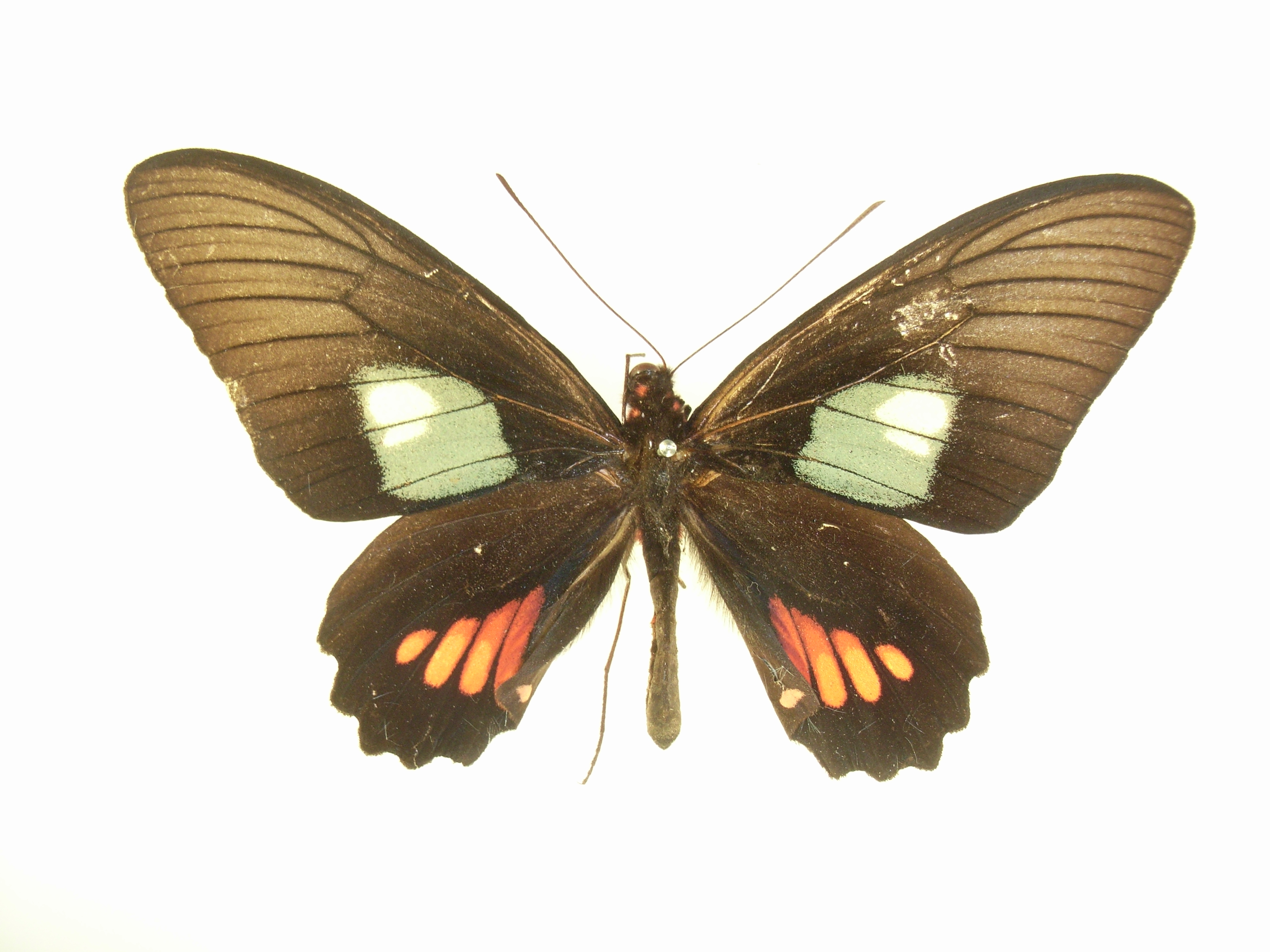
female Parides arcas form antheas

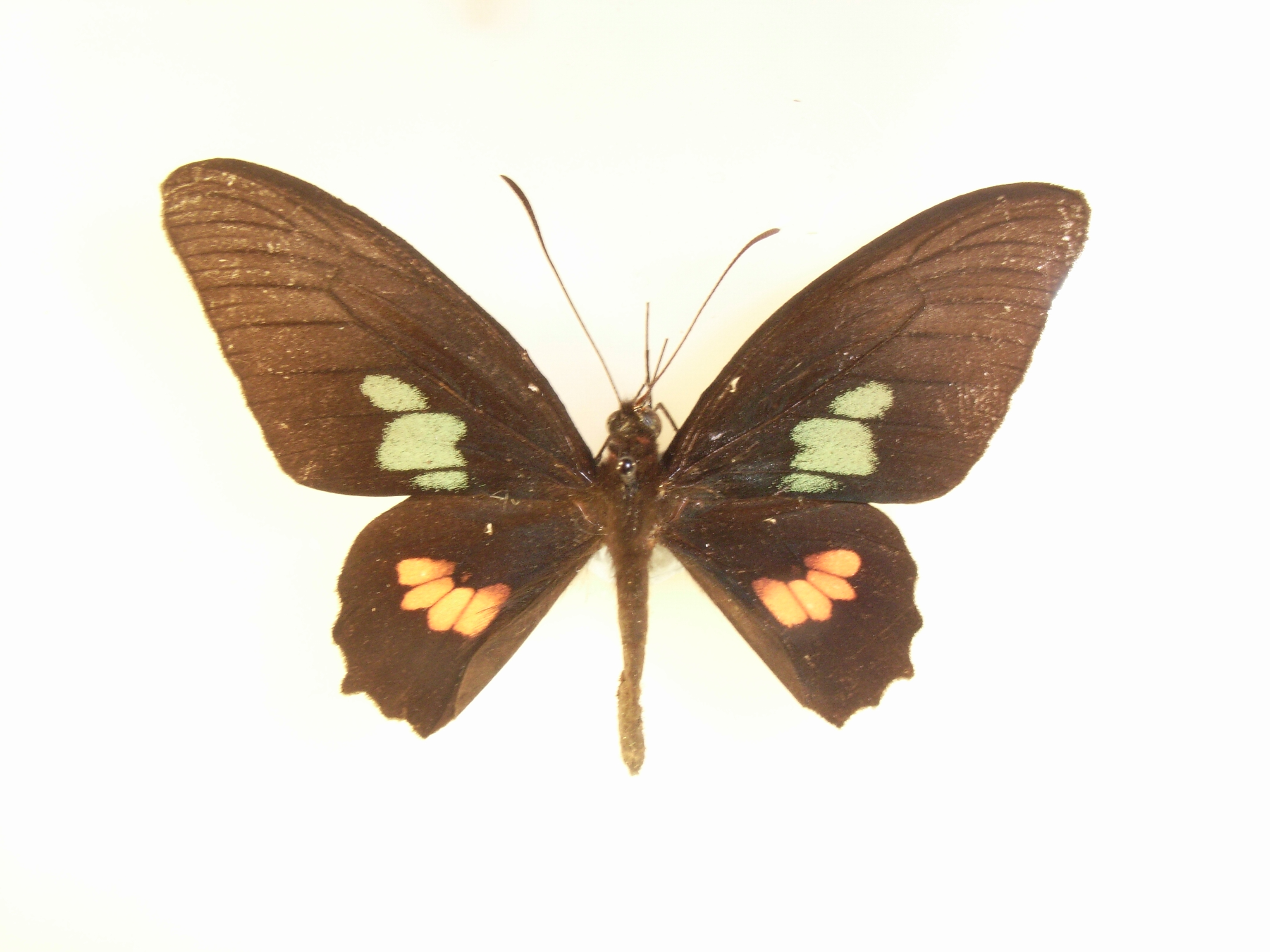
male Parides eurimedes antheas

== Description ==
The wingspan measures 7 to 8.5 cm (2.8 to 3.3 in). P. e. mylotes is black with both sexes having a red patch on the dorsal hindwing. The dorsal forewing of the male has a triangular green patch. The female has a white patch on the dorsal forewing. A full description (as P. arcas and P.timias) is provided by Rothschild, W. and Jordan, K. (1906)

== Distribution and habitat ==
P. eurimedes is found in the Neotropical realm from Mexico to northern South America, where it is commonly found in tropical forests.

== Life cycle ==
The purple-brown caterpillar is spotted with black. A white lateral stripe is found on each side of the body. The chrysalis is pale yellow green. Host plants include Aristolochia grandiflora, A. nummularfolia, A. odoratissima, A. pilosa, and A. tonduzii.

== Taxonomy ==
Parides eurimedes is a member of the aeneas species group

The members are

- Parides aeneas
- Parides aglaope
- Parides burchellanus
- Parides echemon
- Parides eurimedes
- Parides lysander – Lysander cattleheart
- Parides neophilus – spear-winged cattleheart
- Parides orellana
- Parides panthonus – panthonus cattleheart
- Parides tros
- Parides zacynthus
