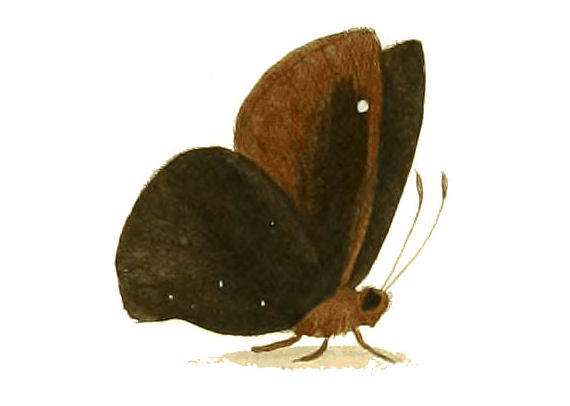
- Ephyriades arcas

Scientific classification
- Kingdom: Animalia
- Phylum: Arthropoda
- Class: Insecta
- Order: Lepidoptera
- Family: Hesperiidae
- Subfamily: Pyrginae
- Tribe: Erynnini
- Genus: Ephyriades; Hübner, 1829

Synonyms
- Brachycorynae Mabille, 1883; Brachycoryne Mabille, 1883; Melanthes Mabille, 1903; Brachycoryne Mabille, 1904

= Ephyriades =

Genus of butterflies

Ephyriades is a genus in the skippers (Hesperiidae) butterfly family. All the species are found in Central America and the Caribbean.

== Species ==
Recognised species in the genus Ephyriades include:

- Ephyriades arcas (Drury, 1773) - Caribbean duskywing
- Ephyriades brunnea (Herrich-Schäffer, 1865) - Florida duskywing
- Ephyriades dominicensis Bell & Comstock, 1948
- Ephyriades eugramma (Mabille, 1888) - Chiriqui skipper
- Ephyriades jamaicensis (Möschler, 1879)
- Ephyriades zephodes (Hübner, 1825) - zephodes duskywing

== References and external links ==
- Ephyriades from Markku Savela's Lepidoptera site.
