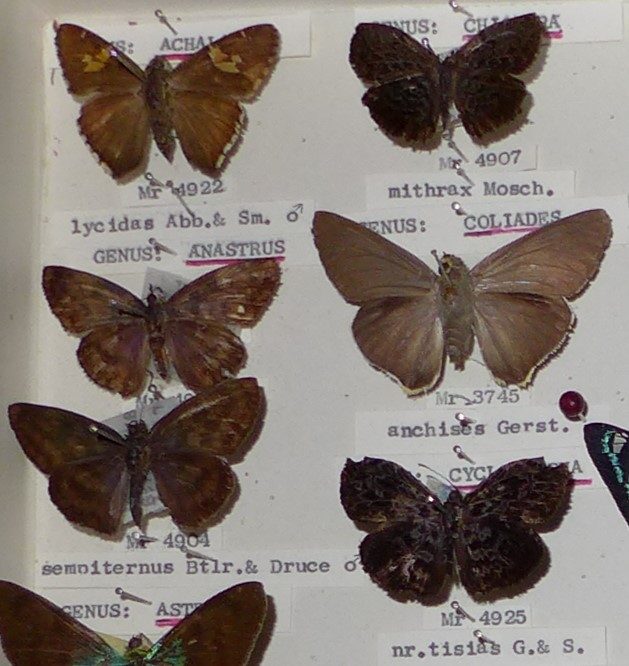

Scientific classification
- Kingdom: Animalia
- Phylum: Arthropoda
- Class: Insecta
- Order: Lepidoptera
- Family: Hesperiidae
- Tribe: Erynnini
- Genus: Chiomara; Godman & Salvin, [1899]

= Chiomara (butterfly) =

Genus of butterflies

Chiomara is a genus of skippers in the family Hesperiidae.

== Species ==
- Chiomara gundlachi Skinner & Ramsden, 1924
- Chiomara mithrax (Möschler, 1879)

=== Former species ===
- Chiomara asychis (Stoll, [1780]) - transferred to Chiothion asychis (Stoll, [1780])
- Chiomara basigutta (Plötz, 1884) - transferred to Chiothion basigutta (Plötz, 1884)
- Chiomara crenda Evans, 1953 - transferred to Crenda crenda (Evans, 1953)
- Chiomara georgina (Reakirt, 1868) - transferred to Chiothion georgina (Reakirt, 1868)
- Chiomara khalili Riley, 1934 - transferred to Chiothion khalili (Riley, 1934)
