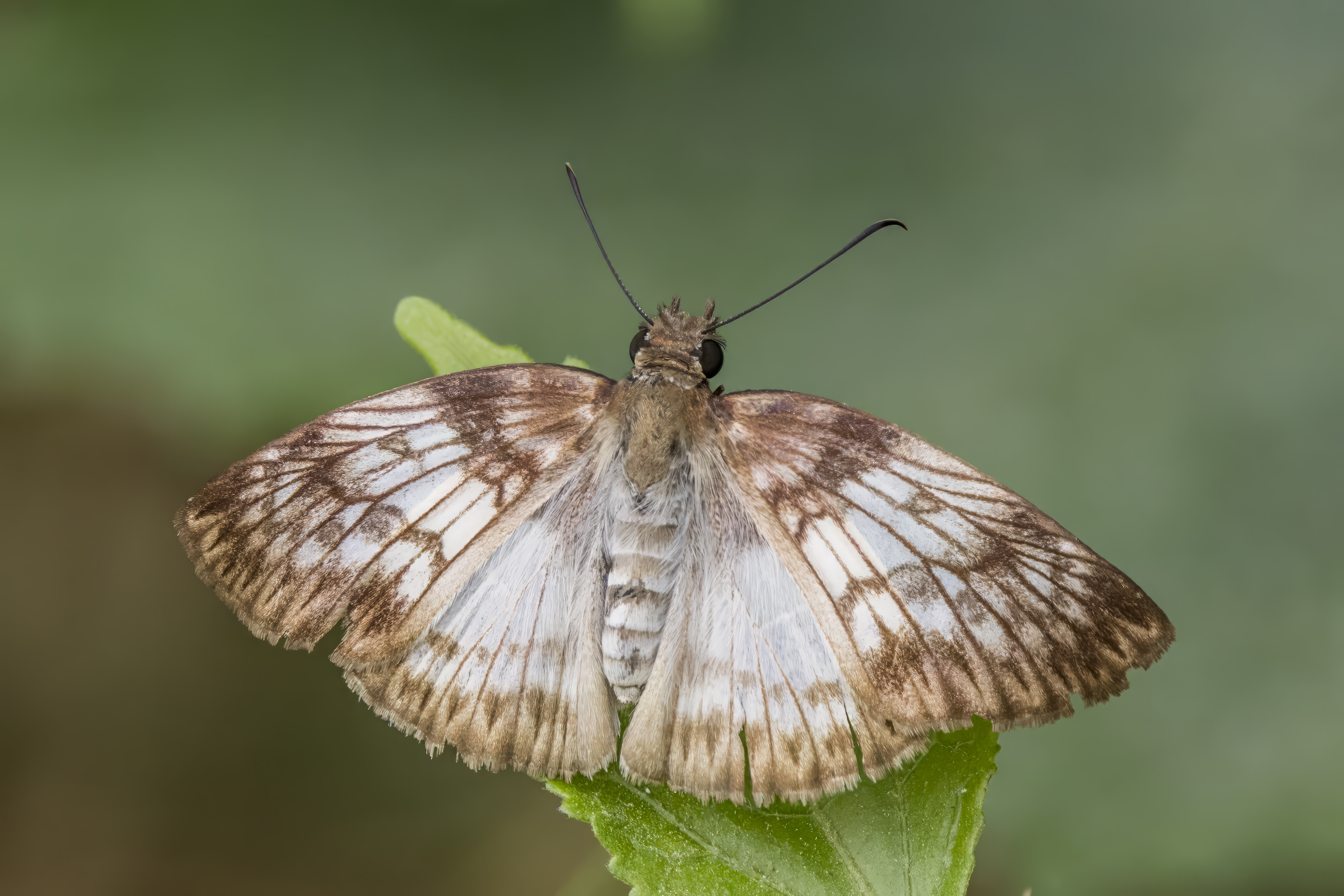
- In Colombia

Scientific classification
- Kingdom: Animalia
- Phylum: Arthropoda
- Class: Insecta
- Order: Lepidoptera
- Family: Hesperiidae
- Genus: Mylon
- Species: M. maimon

Binomial name
- Mylon maimon (Fabricius, 1775)

Synonyms
- List: Mylon menippus (Fabricius, 1777); Mylon melander (Cramer, [1780]); Papilio maimon Fabricius, 1775; Papilio menippus Fabricius, 1777; Papilio melander Cramer, [1780]; Eudamias melander

= Mylon maimon =

Species of butterfly

Mylon maimon, the common mylon or black-veined mylon, is a butterfly of the family Hesperiidae. It is found from Argentina to Colombia and Bolivia, and north to Mexico. It is found at heights ranging from sea level to about 1,800 meters.
