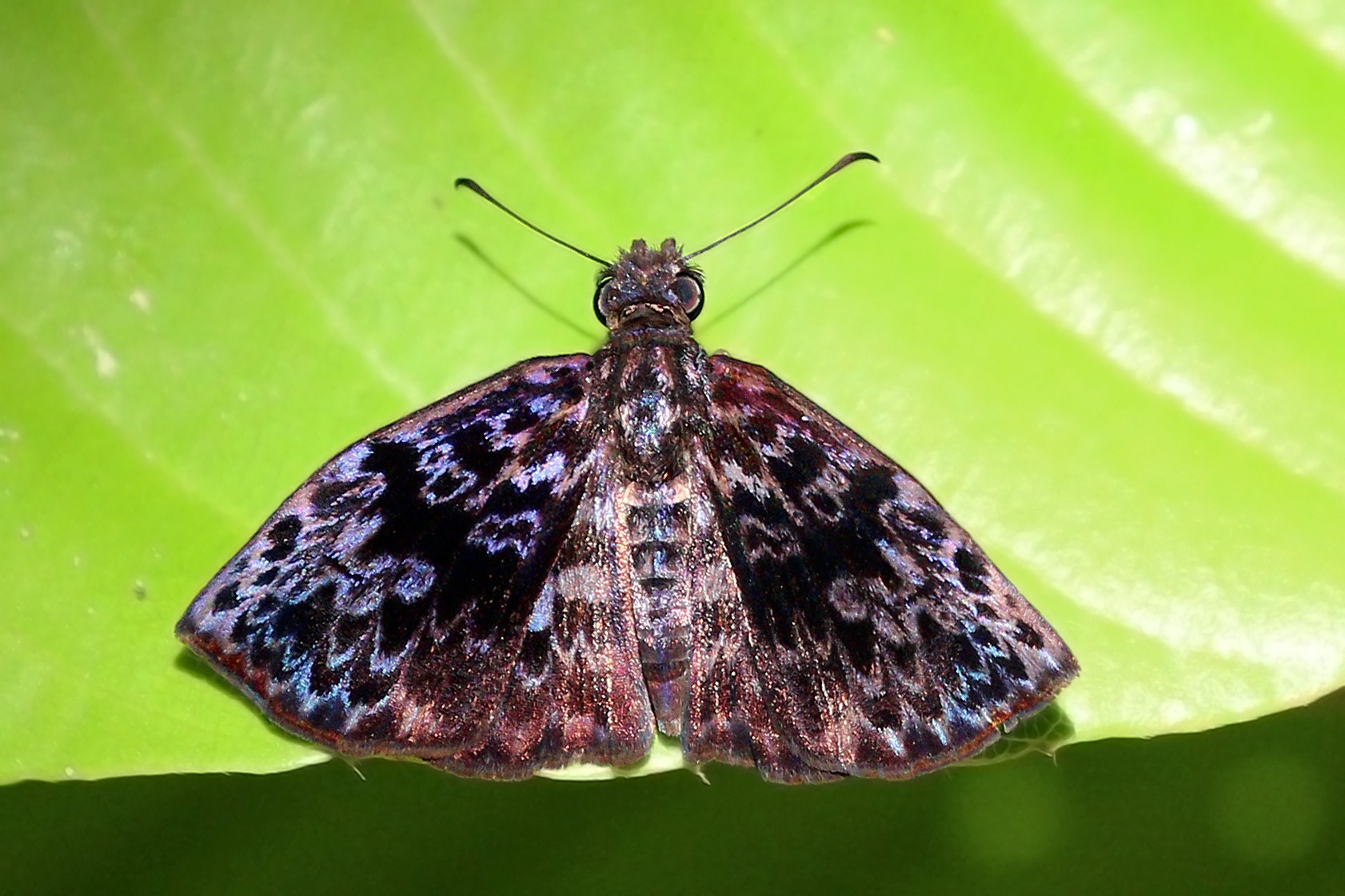
- Cycloglypha thrasibulus

Scientific classification
- Kingdom: Animalia
- Phylum: Arthropoda
- Class: Insecta
- Order: Lepidoptera
- Family: Hesperiidae
- Tribe: Erynnini
- Genus: Cycloglypha; Mabille, 1903

= Cycloglypha =

Genus of butterflies

Cycloglypha is a genus of skippers in the family Hesperiidae.

== Species ==
Recognised species in the genus Cycloglypha are:

- Cycloglypha thrasibulus (Fabricius, 1793)
- Cycloglypha tisias (Godman & Salvin, 1896)
- Cycloglypha caeruleonigra Mabille, 1903
- Cycloglypha stellita J. Zikán, 1938
- Cycloglypha enega (Möschler, 1877)
- Cycloglypha polax Evans, 1953
