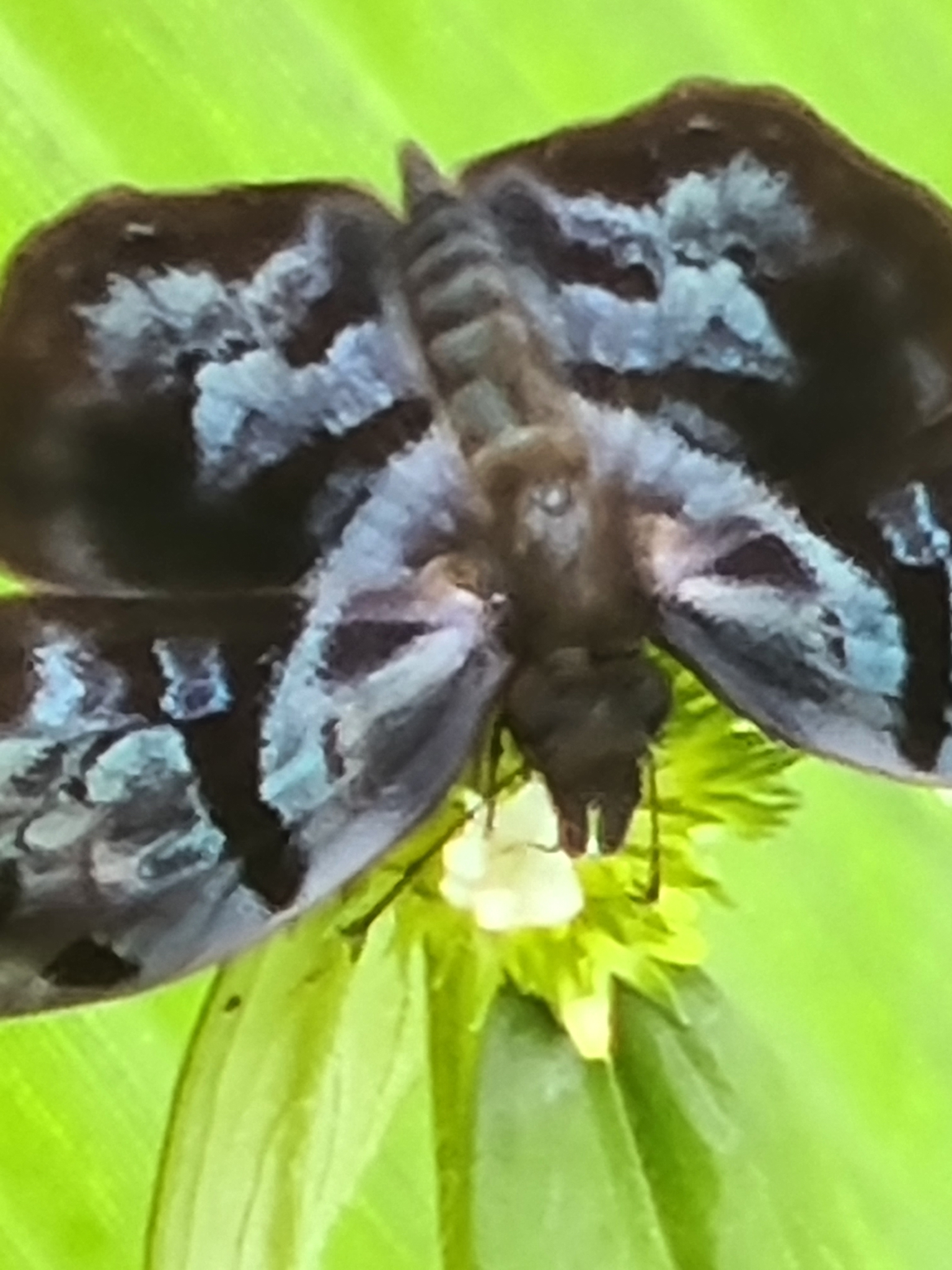

Scientific classification
- Kingdom: Animalia
- Phylum: Arthropoda
- Class: Insecta
- Order: Lepidoptera
- Family: Hesperiidae
- Genus: Helias
- Species: H. phalaenoides

Binomial name
- Helias phalaenoides Fabricius, 1807

= Helias phalaenoides =

Species of butterfly

Helias phalaenoides is a species of moth from the genus Helias.
