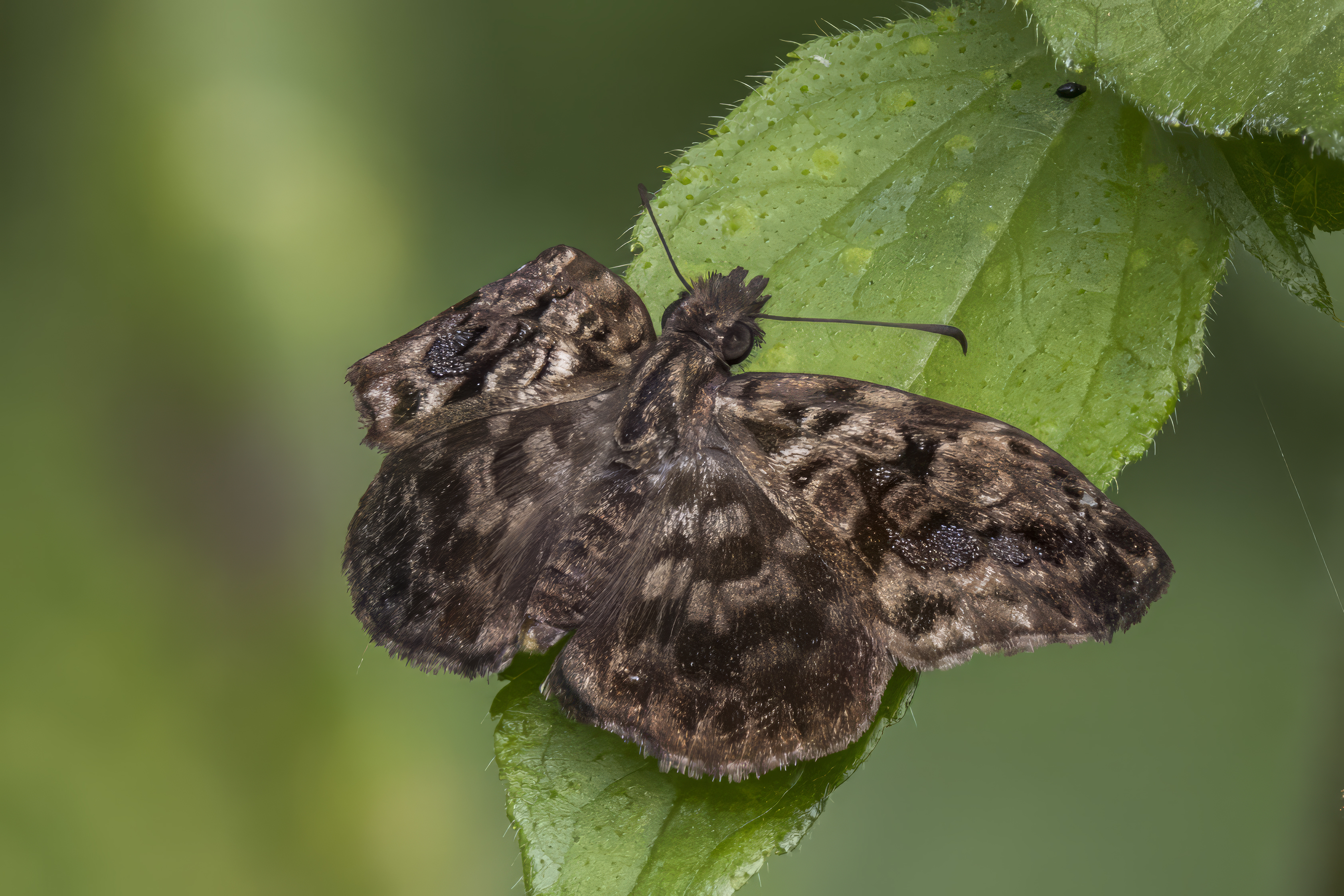
- Variegated skipper G. begga pyralina, Colombia

Scientific classification
- Kingdom: Animalia
- Phylum: Arthropoda
- Class: Insecta
- Order: Lepidoptera
- Family: Hesperiidae
- Subfamily: Pyrginae
- Tribe: Erynnini
- Genus: Gorgythion; Godman & Salvin, 1896

= Gorgythion (butterfly) =

Genus of butterflies

Gorgythion is a genus of skippers in the family Hesperiidae.

== Species ==
Recognised species in the genus Gorgythion include:

- Gorgythion begga (Prittwitz, 1868)
- Gorgythion beggina Mabille, 1897
- Gorgythion plautia (Möschler, 1877)
