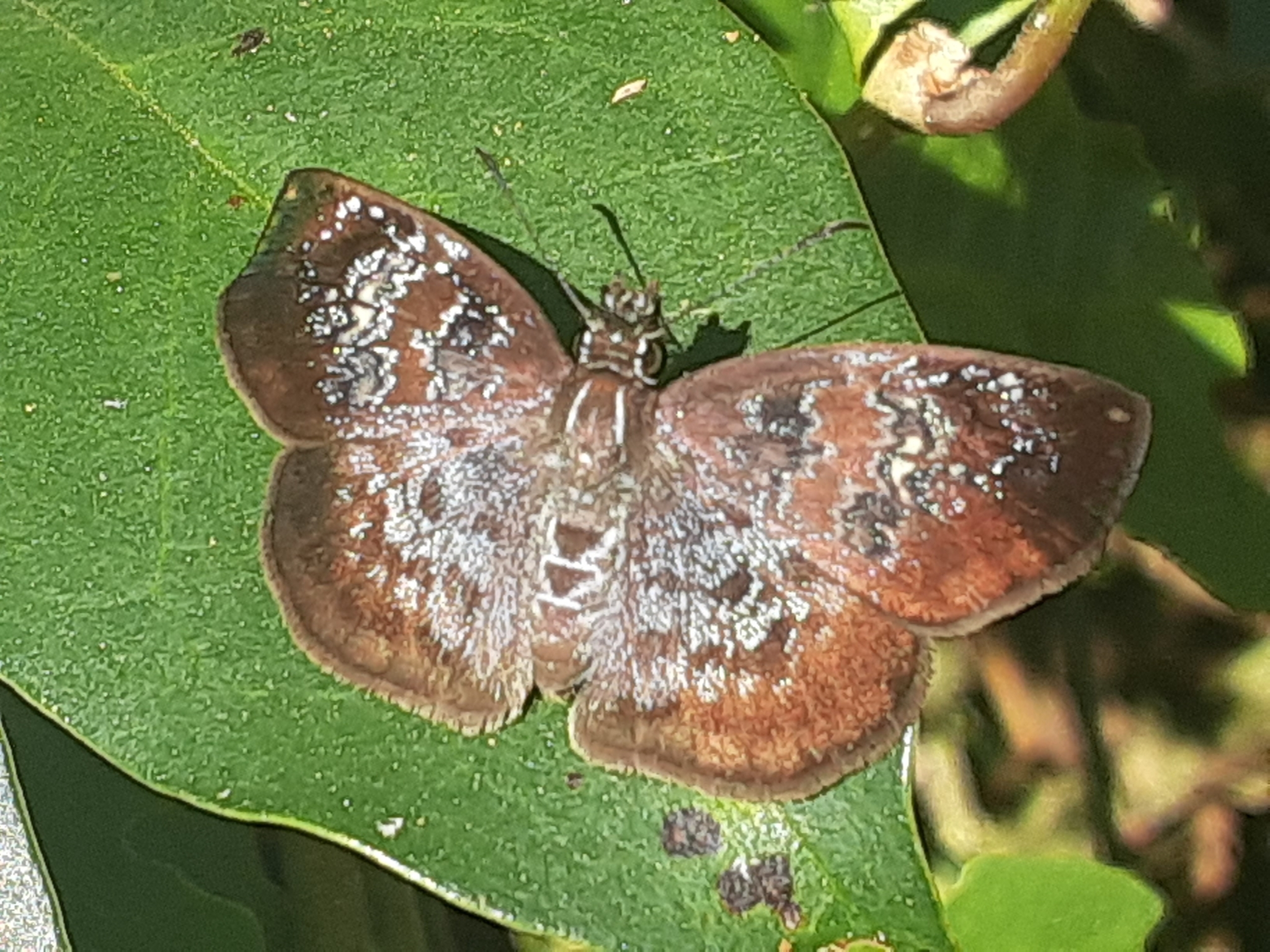
- Sostrata bifasciata

Scientific classification
- Kingdom: Animalia
- Phylum: Arthropoda
- Class: Insecta
- Order: Lepidoptera
- Family: Hesperiidae
- Tribe: Erynnini
- Genus: Sostrata; Godman & Salvin, [1895]

= Sostrata =

Genus of butterflies

Sostrata is a genus of skippers in the family Hesperiidae.

== Species ==
Recognised species in the genus Sostrata include:

- Sostrata bifasciata (Ménétriés, 1829)
- Sostrata nordica Evans, [1953]
- Sostrata pusilla Godman & Salvin, 1895

=== Former species ===
- Sostrata adamantinus Mabille, 1898 - transferred to Festivia adamantinus (Mabille, 1898)
- Sostrata caerulans Mabille and Boullet, 1917 - transferred to Festivia caerulans (Mabille and Boullet, 1917)
- Sostrata cronion C and R. Felder, 1867 - transferred to Festivia cronion (C and R. Felder, 1867)
- Sostrata festiva Erichson, [1849] - transferred to Festivia festiva (Erichson, [1849])
- Sostrata grippa Evans, 1953 - transferred to Festivia grippa (Evans, 1953)
- Sostrata jinna Evans, 1953 - transferred to Festivia jinna (Evans, 1953)
