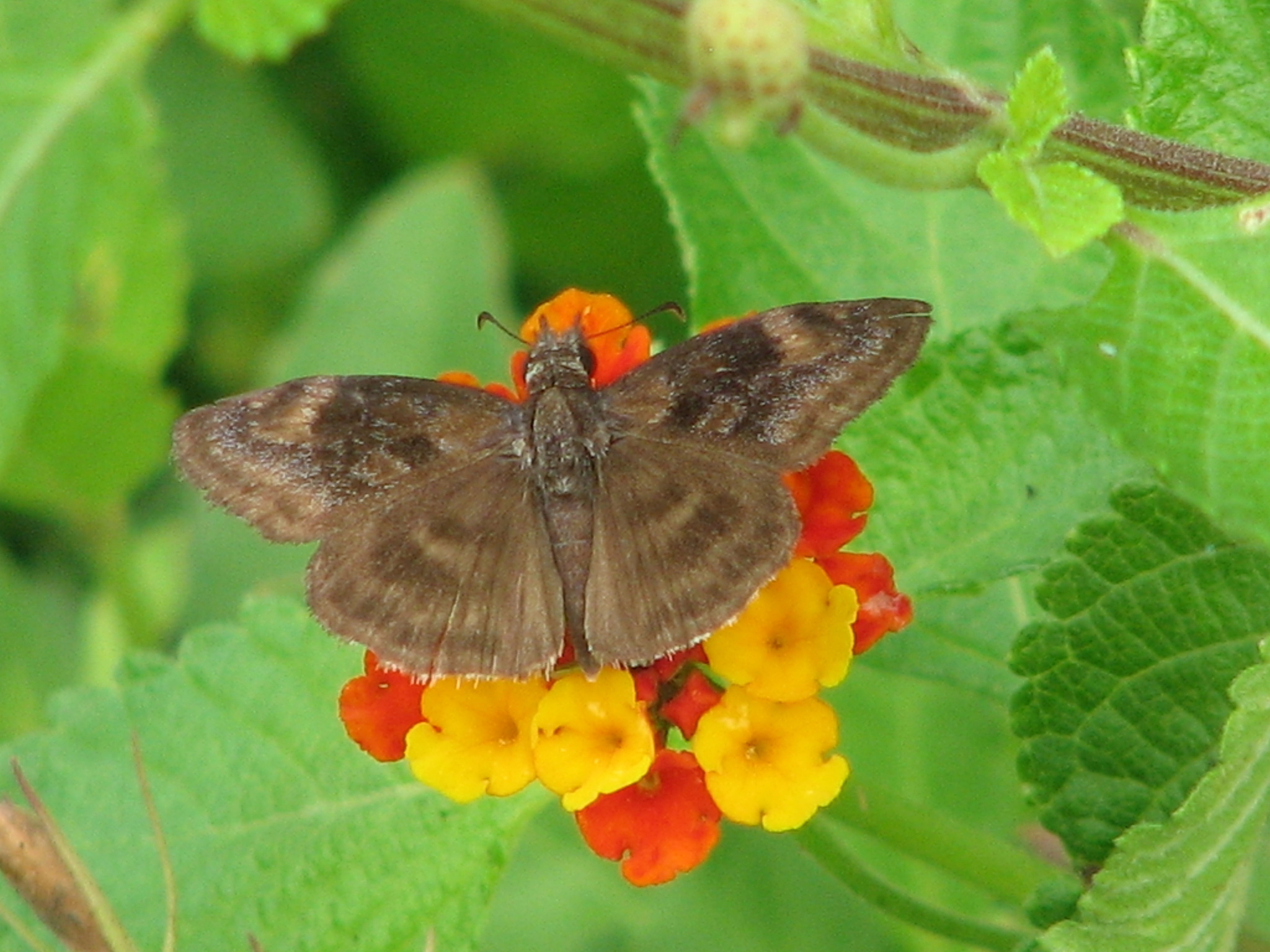
- Gesta invisus

Scientific classification
- Kingdom: Animalia
- Phylum: Arthropoda
- Clade: Pancrustacea
- Class: Insecta
- Order: Lepidoptera
- Family: Hesperiidae
- Subfamily: Pyrginae
- Tribe: Erynnini
- Genus: Gesta; Evans, 1953

= Gesta (butterfly) =

Genus of butterflies

Gesta is a genus of skippers in the family Hesperiidae.

Many species of the genus are attested under the name "Duskywing".

== Species ==
Recognised species in the genus Gesta without much dispute include:

- Gesta gesta (Herrich Schäffer, 1863)
- Gesta invisus (Butler & H. Druce, 1872), called False Duskywings, and native to an area stretching from Costa Rica to Texas.
- Gesta inga
- Gesta austerus
- Gesta heteropteus

Per, and in accordance with practice on some but not all sources, the subgenus Erynnides, previously accounted as part of Erynnis may be counted as a subgenus of Gesta.
