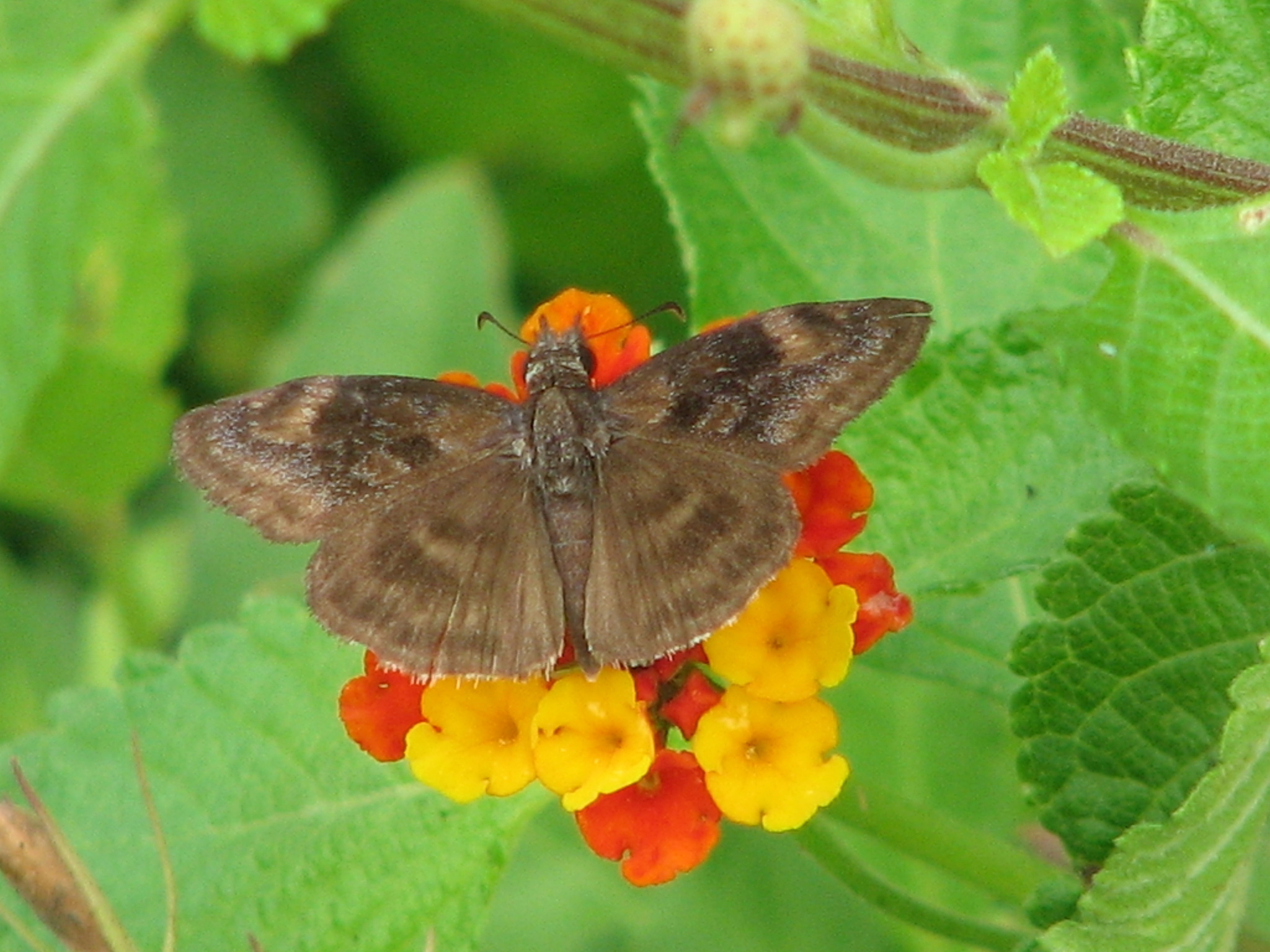

Scientific classification
- Kingdom: Animalia
- Phylum: Arthropoda
- Class: Insecta
- Order: Lepidoptera
- Family: Hesperiidae
- Genus: Gesta
- Species: G. invisus

Binomial name
- Gesta invisus (Butler & H. Druce, 1872)

Synonyms
- Achlyodes gorgona Plötz, 1884; Nisoniades llano Dodge, 1903; Thanaos invisus Butler and H. Druce, 1872

= Gesta invisus =

Species of butterfly

Gesta invisus, the false duskywing, is a species of spread-wing skipper in the family Hesperiidae. It was described by Arthur Gardiner Butler and Herbert Druce in 1872 and is found in Central and North America.

The MONA or Hodges number for Gesta invisus is 3943.
