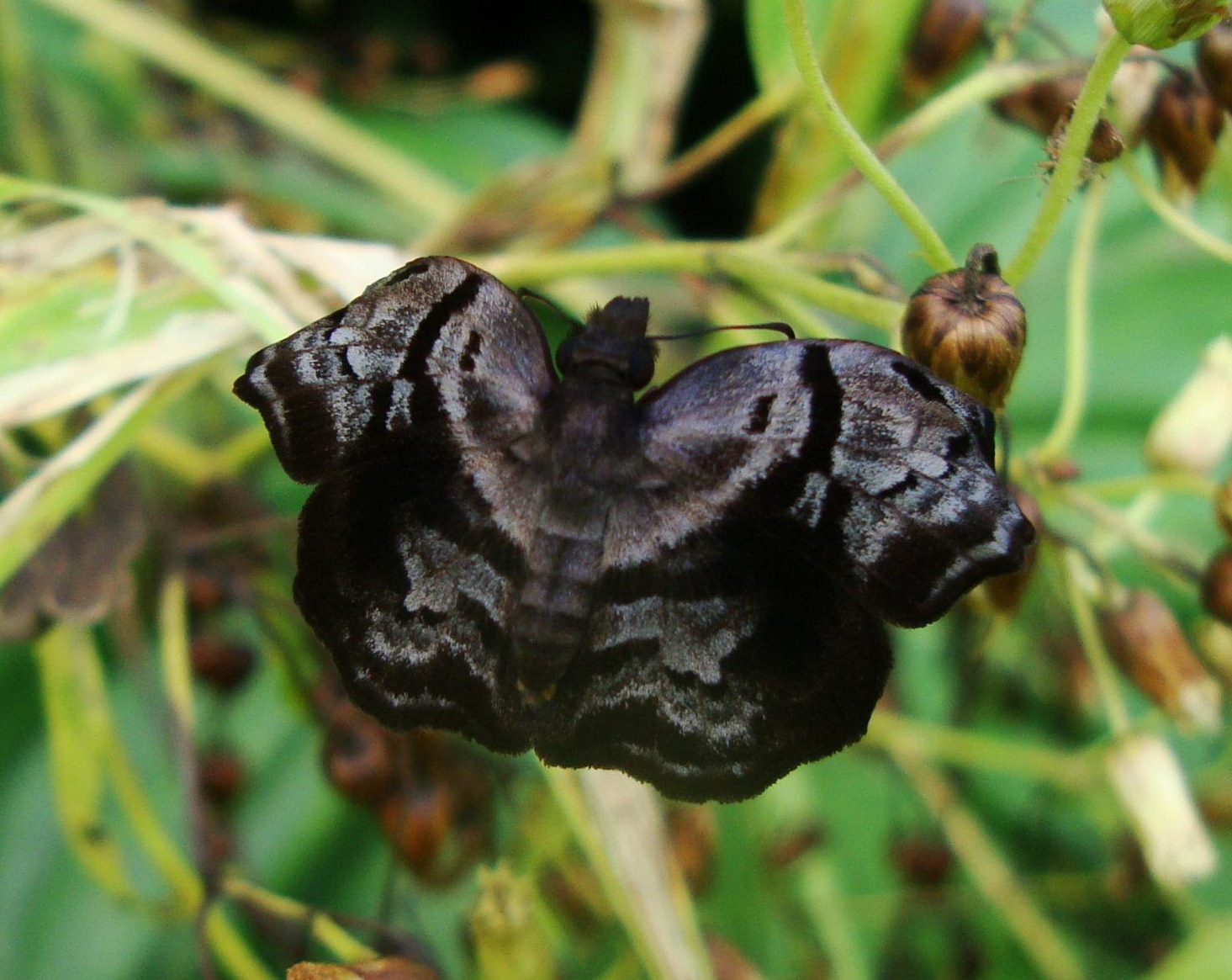
- Helias phalaenoides

Scientific classification
- Kingdom: Animalia
- Phylum: Arthropoda
- Class: Insecta
- Order: Lepidoptera
- Family: Hesperiidae
- Tribe: Erynnini
- Genus: Helias; Fabricius, 1807

= Helias =

Genus of butterflies

Helias is a genus of skippers in the family Hesperiidae.

== Species ==
Recognised species in the genus Helias include:

- Helias phalaenoides (Fabricius, 1807)

=== Former species ===
- Helias ascalaphus Staudinger, 1876 - transferred to Staphylus ascalaphus (Staudinger, 1876)
- Helias pallida Felder, 1869 - transferred to Eantis pallida (Felder, 1869)
- Helias satyrus C. and R. Felder, [1867] - transferred to Timochreon satyrus (C. and R. Felder, [1867])
