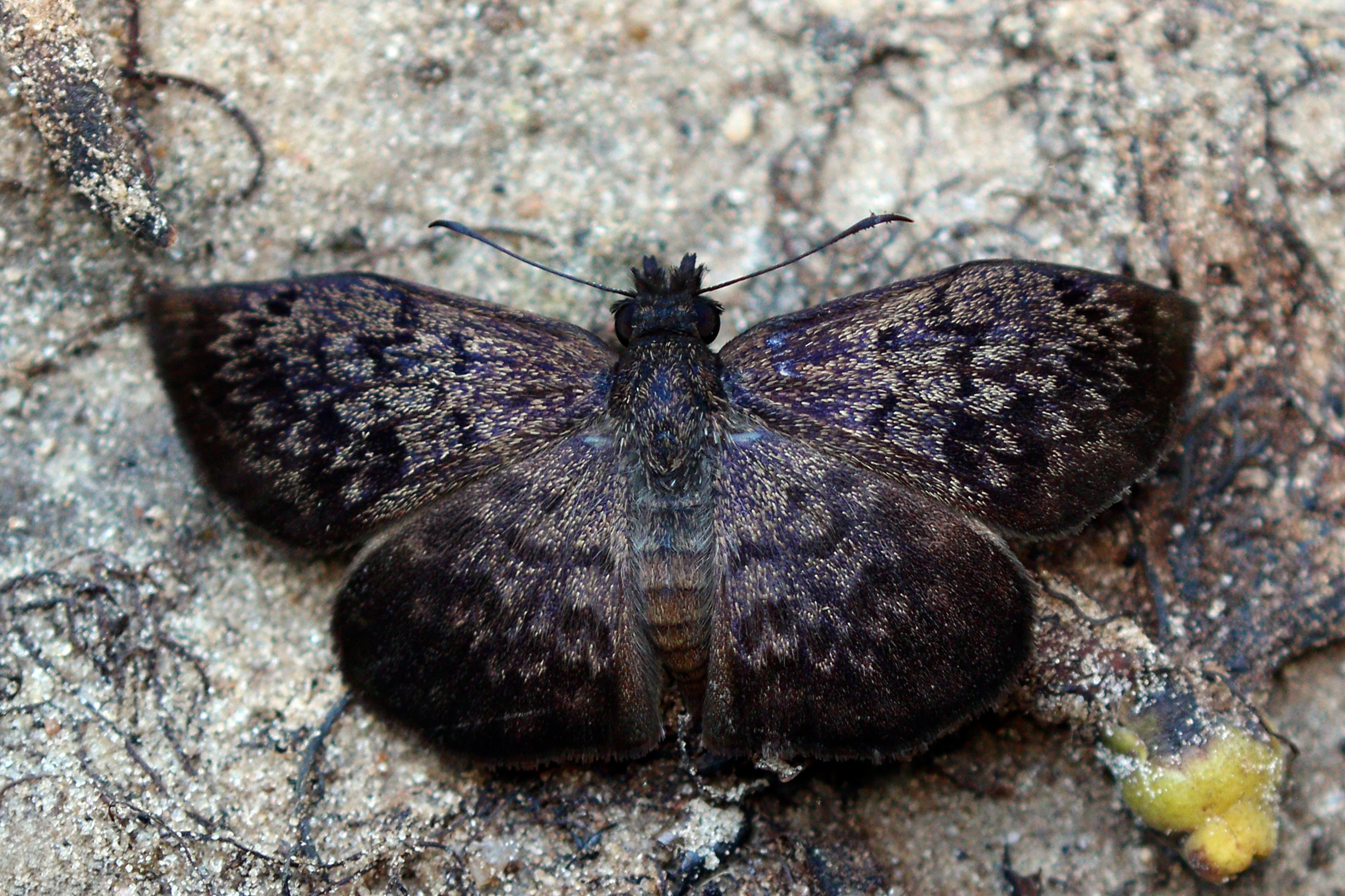
- C. theramenes (Mabille's bentwing); Cristalino River, Southern Amazon, Brazil

Scientific classification
- Kingdom: Animalia
- Phylum: Arthropoda
- Class: Insecta
- Order: Lepidoptera
- Family: Hesperiidae
- Tribe: Erynnini
- Genus: Camptopleura; Mabille, 1877

= Camptopleura =

Genus of butterflies

Camptopleura is a genus of skippers in the family Hesperiidae.

== Species ==
- Camptopleura auxo (Möschler, 1879) – Auxo skipper
- Camptopleura cincta Mabille and Boullet, 1917
- Camptopleura janthinus (Capronnier, 1874)
- Camptopleura oaxaca Freeman, 1969 – Oaxacan bent-skipper
- Camptopleura orsus (Mabille, 1889)
- Camptopleura termon (Hopffer, 1874) – Termon skipper
- Camptopleura theramenes Mabille, 1877 - Mabille's bentwing
