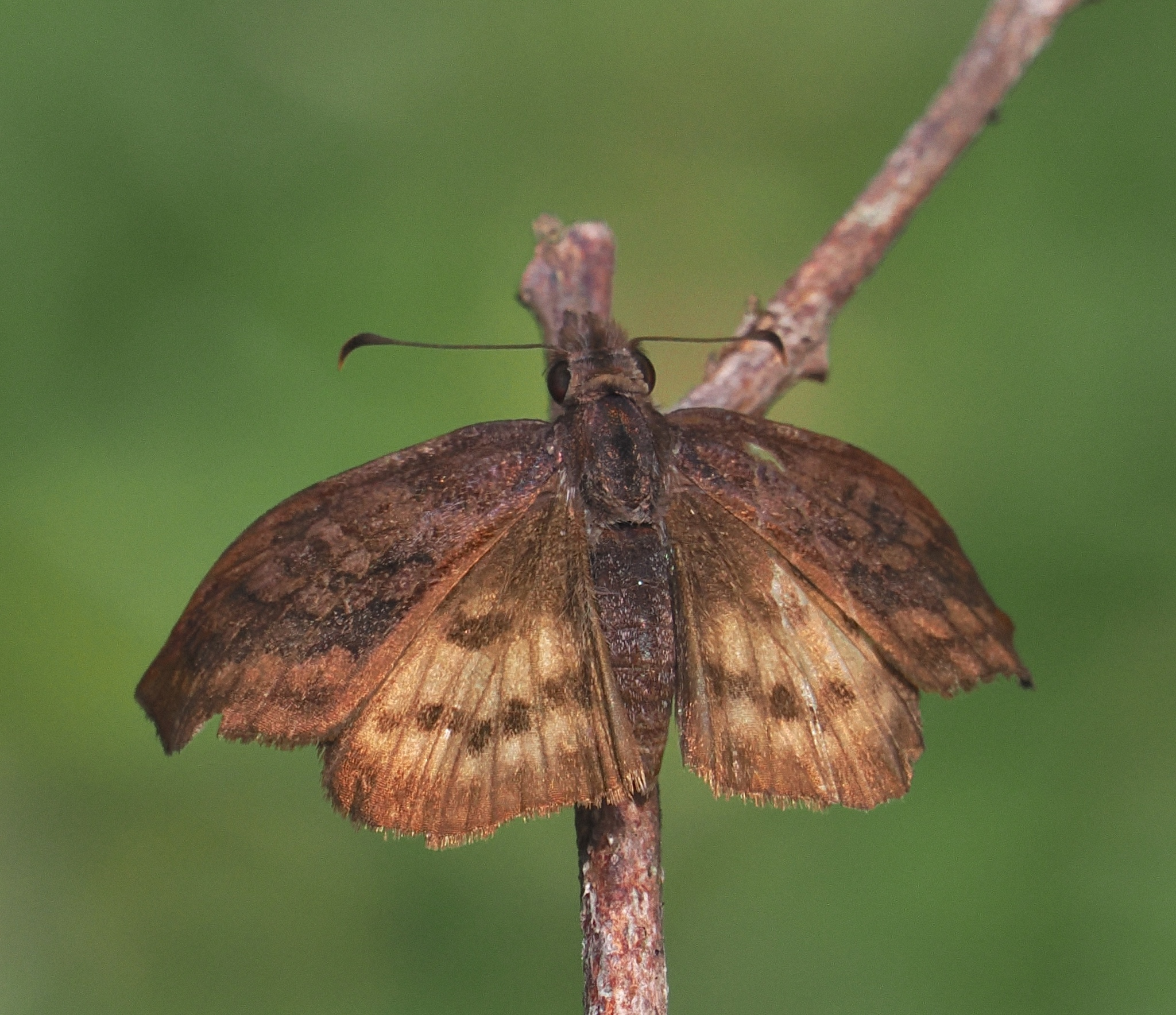
- Theagenes dichrous

Scientific classification
- Kingdom: Animalia
- Phylum: Arthropoda
- Class: Insecta
- Order: Lepidoptera
- Family: Hesperiidae
- Tribe: Erynnini
- Genus: Theagenes; Godman & Salvin, [1896]

= Theagenes (butterfly) =

Genus of butterflies

Theagenes is a genus of skippers in the family Hesperiidae.
