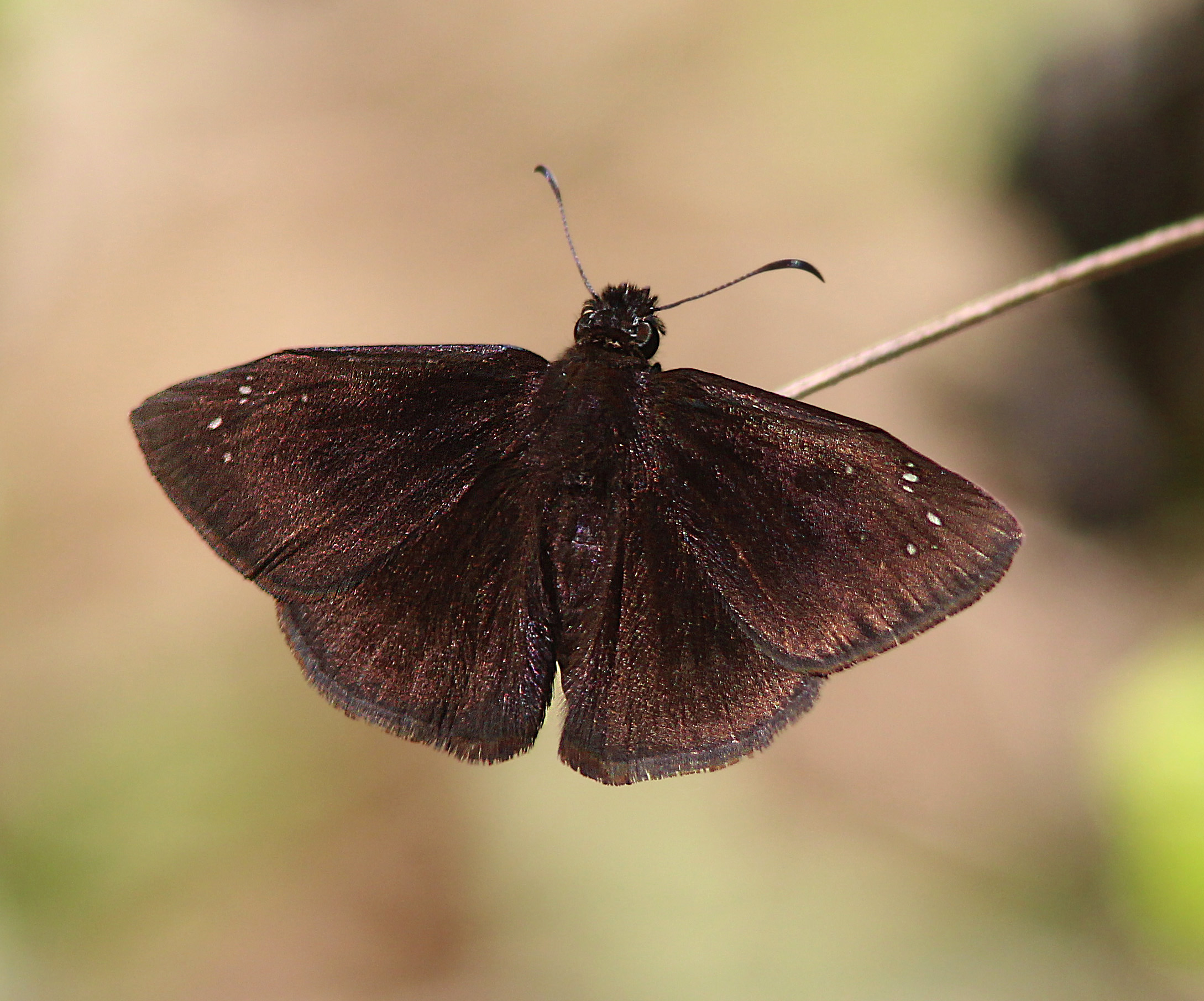
- In Key West Tropical Forest, Florida, United States

Scientific classification
- Kingdom: Animalia
- Phylum: Arthropoda
- Class: Insecta
- Order: Lepidoptera
- Family: Hesperiidae
- Genus: Ephyriades
- Species: E. brunnea

Binomial name
- Ephyriades brunnea (Herrich-Schäffer, 1865)

Synonyms
- Nisodiades brunnea Herrich-Schäffer, 1865

= Ephyriades brunnea =

Species of butterfly

Ephyriades brunnea, the Florida duskywing skipper, is a butterfly in the family Hesperiidae. It was first described by Gottlieb August Wilhelm Herrich-Schäffer in 1865. The larvae feed on Barbados cherry (Malpighia emarginata), while wild coffee (Psychotria ligustrifolia) has been noted as an important adult nectar source, along with Bidens alba, Croton granduosus, and Lantana involucrata. The larvae are known to be parasitized by two species of parasitic wasp. It is found in South Florida, inhabiting pine rockland habitats. The species is of conservation concern.

== Description ==
The duskywing skipper has a wingspan of around 1 7/8 inches (48 mm). The dorsal side of the male's wing is dark brown with a sheen, and a circle of white transparent spots near the apex with a broad lighter brown margin on the hindwing. The dorsal side of the female's wing is brown with dark mottling and dark outer margins. Females have larger and more numerous dorsal spots than males. When freshly emerged, both sexes have a purplish sheen on the dorsal side of the forewing. The caterpillar is a small and translucent green. The head is black with orange patches on the sides and upper face. A dark line bordered in yellow is on the back with yellow lines along the sides and multiple small yellow spots.

== Conservation ==
In recent years, populations of the butterfly have noticeably declined. By virtue of its specialized habitat requirement, and location in habitats that face threats from sea level rise, the butterfly is considered threatened by climate change. It is listed as a Species of Greatest Conservation Need (SGCN) in Florida's State Wildlife Action Plan. Despite small population sizes and habitat fragmentation, populations of the butterfly do exhibit moderate genetic diversity and interpopulation gene flow.

The species appears not to be infected by the bacterial reproductive parasite Wolbachia.
