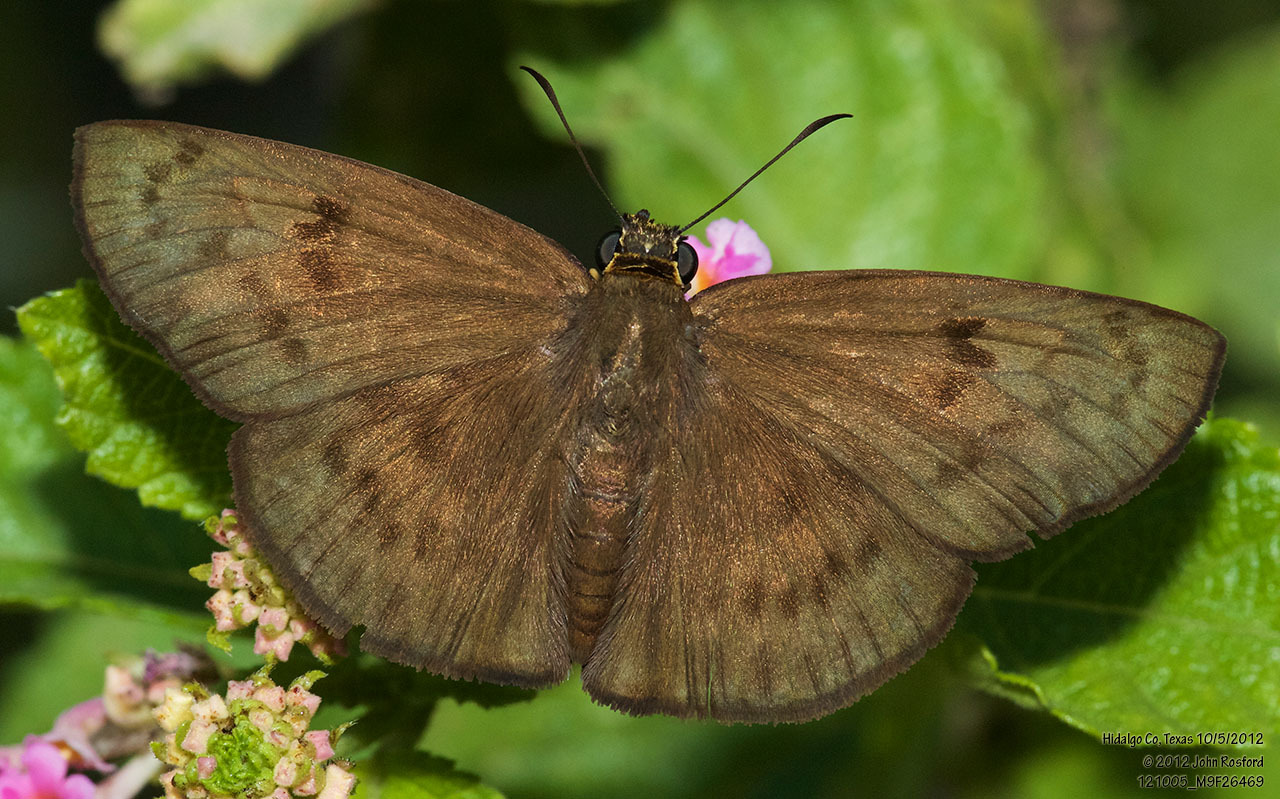

Scientific classification
- Kingdom: Animalia
- Phylum: Arthropoda
- Class: Insecta
- Order: Lepidoptera
- Family: Hesperiidae
- Genus: Grais; Godman & Salvin, [1894]
- Species: G. stigmaticus

Binomial name
- Grais stigmaticus (Mabille, 1883)

Synonyms
- Anastrus stigmaticus Mabille, 1883

= Grais stigmaticus =

Species of butterfly

Grais is a genus of skipper butterflies in the family Hesperiidae. It is monotypic, with the only species, Grais stigmaticus, commonly known as the hermit skipper, found from the south-western US (Texas) to Argentina, and Jamaica in the Caribbean
