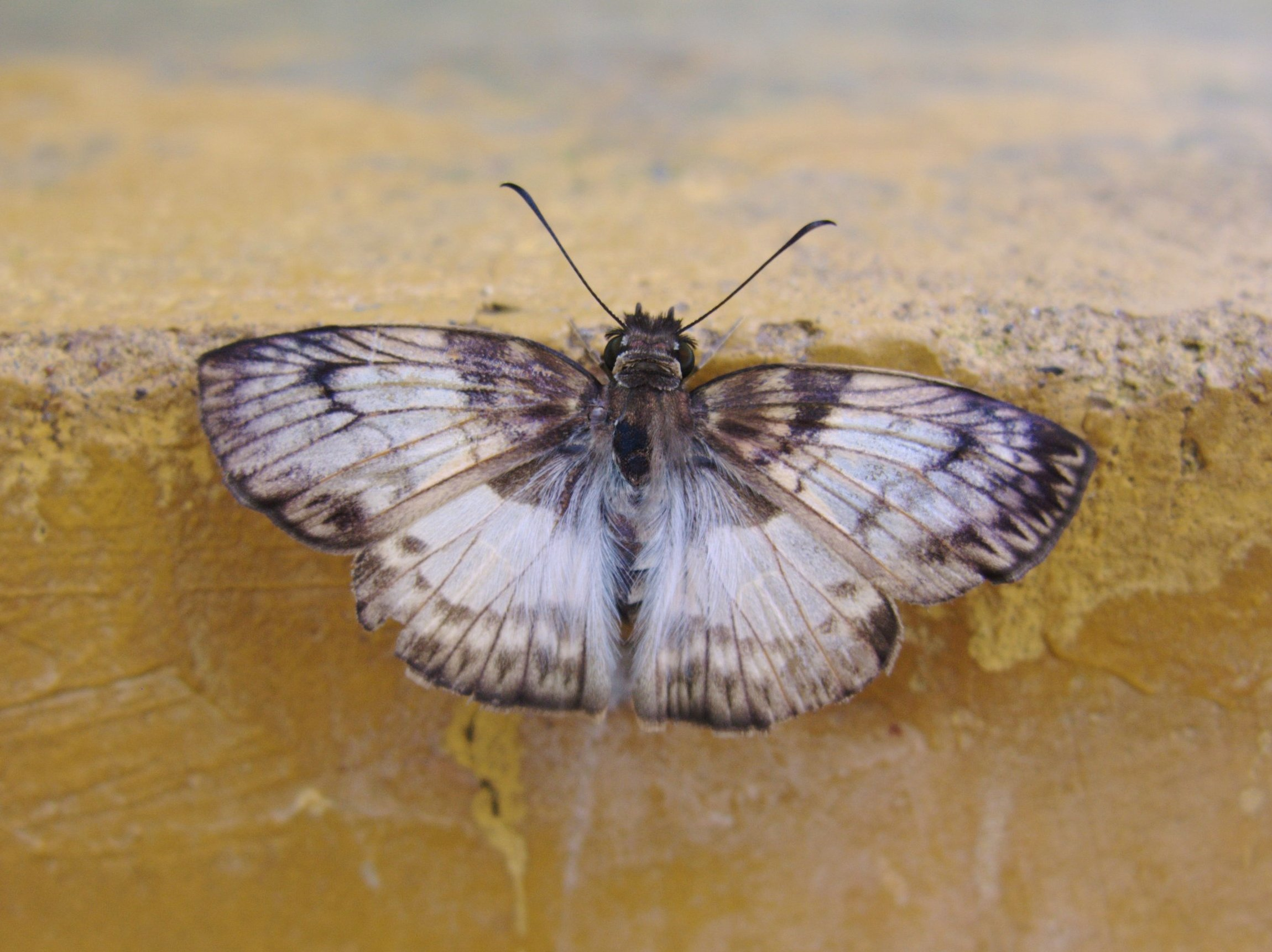
- Mylon maimon

Scientific classification
- Kingdom: Animalia
- Phylum: Arthropoda
- Class: Insecta
- Order: Lepidoptera
- Family: Hesperiidae
- Subtribe: Erynnina
- Genus: Mylon; Godman & Salvin, [1894]

= Mylon =

Genus of butterflies

Mylon is a genus of skippers in the family Hesperiidae.

== Species ==
- Mylon lassia (Hewitson, 1868)
- Mylon illineatus Mabille & Boullet, 1917
- Mylon orsa Evans, 1953
- Mylon mestor Evans, 1953
- Mylon ander Evans, 1953
- Mylon maimon (Fabricius, 1775)
- Mylon cajus (Plötz, 1884)
- Mylon salvia Evans, 1953
- Mylon zephus (Butler, 1870)
