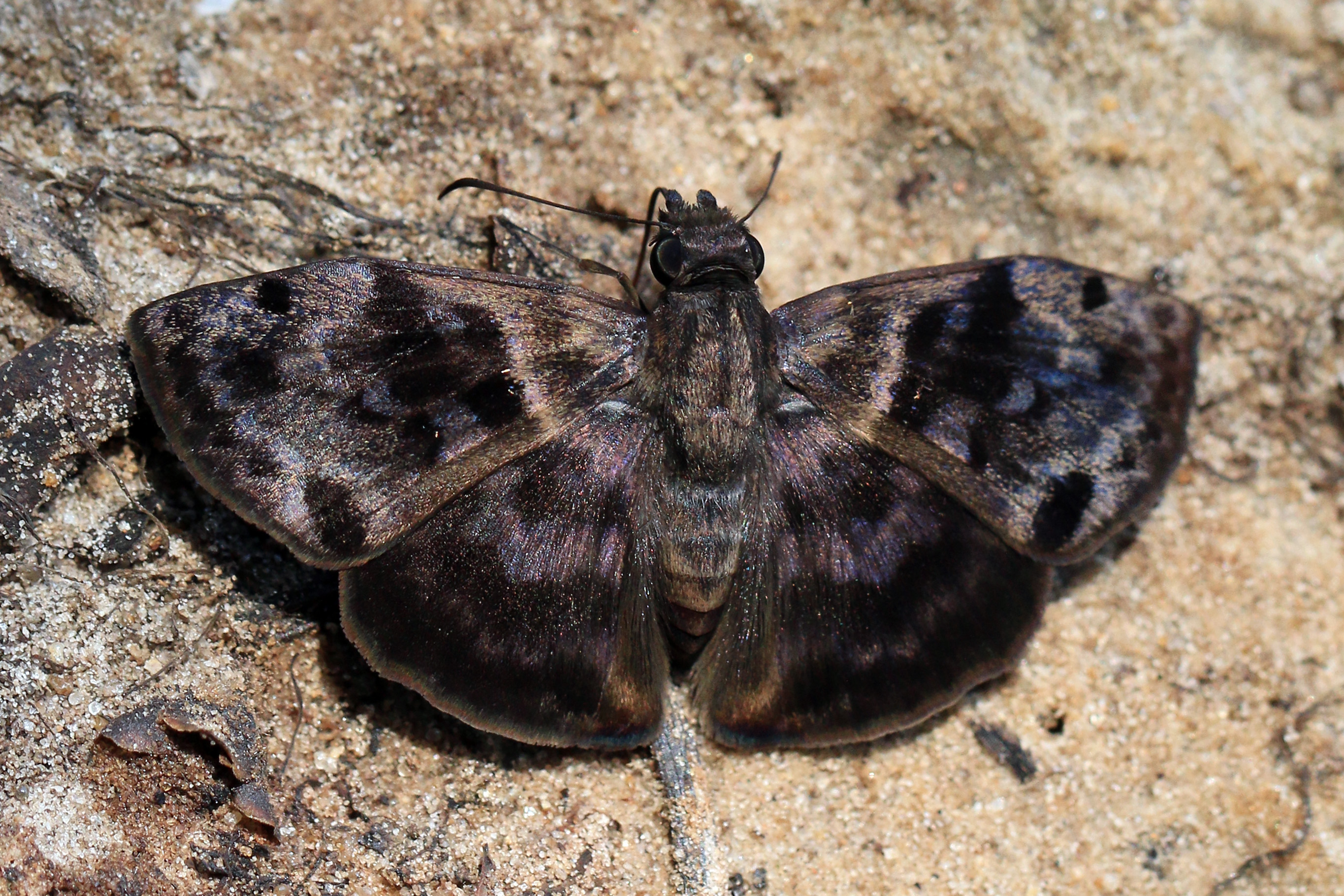
- E. anacreon, Cristalino River; Southern Amazon, Brazil

Scientific classification
- Kingdom: Animalia
- Phylum: Arthropoda
- Class: Insecta
- Order: Lepidoptera
- Family: Hesperiidae
- Subtribe: Erynnina
- Genus: Ebrietas; Godman & Salvin, [1896]

Species
- See text

= Ebrietas =

Genus of butterflies

Ebrietas is a genus of skippers in the family Hesperiidae found in the Neotropical ecozone.

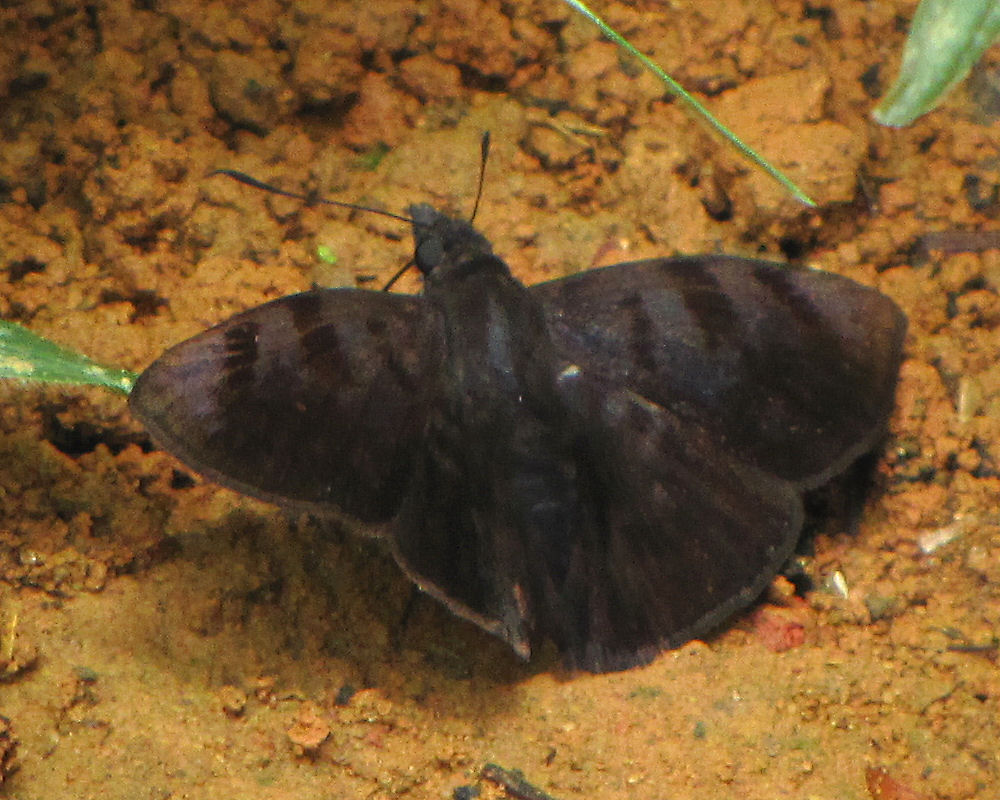
Blurred bentwing (E. evanidus)

== Species ==
Listed alphabetically.

- Ebrietas anacreon (Staudinger, 1876) – common bentwing
- Ebrietas badia (Plötz, 1884)
- Ebrietas elaudia (Plötz, 1884) – plain bentwing
- Ebrietas evanidus Mabille, 1898 – blurred bentwing
- Ebrietas infanda (Butler, 1877)
- Ebrietas osyris (Staudinger, 1876) – great bentwing
- Ebrietas sappho Steinhauser, 1974 – Sappho bentwing
