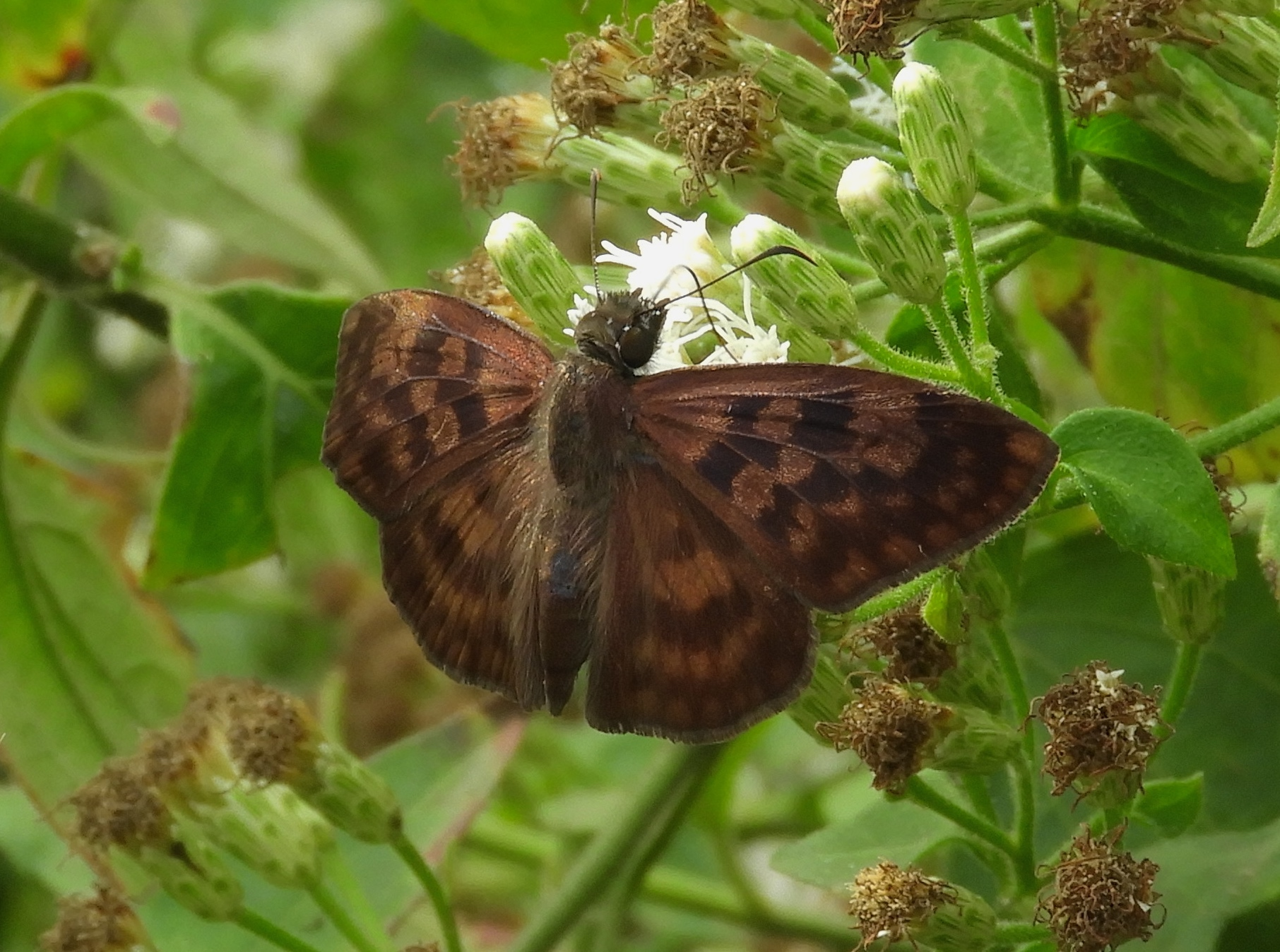
- E. sempiternus ssp. sempiternus

Scientific classification
- Kingdom: Animalia
- Phylum: Arthropoda
- Class: Insecta
- Order: Lepidoptera
- Family: Hesperiidae
- Genus: Echelatus; Godman & Salvin, [1894]
- Species: E. sempiternus

Binomial name
- Echelatus sempiternus (Butler & Druce, 1872)

Synonyms
- (Species): Achlyodes sempiternus Butler & Druce, 1872; Anastrus sempiternus (Butler & Druce, 1872)

= Echelatus =

Echelatus sempiternus

Genus of butterflies

Echelatus is a genus of spread-wing skippers in the family Hesperiidae. It is monotypic, being represented by the single species Echelatus sempiternus, the common bluevent, which is found in North America.

== Subspecies ==
The following subspecies are recognised:

- Echelatus sempiternus dilloni Bell & Comstock, 1948
- Echelatus sempiternus sempiternus (Butler & H. Druce, 1872)
- Echelatus sempiternus simplicior Möschler, 1876
