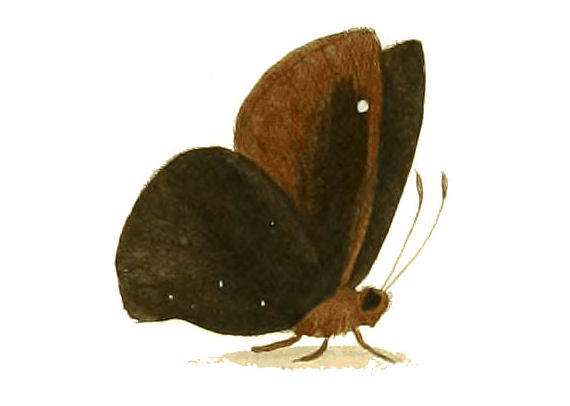

Scientific classification
- Domain: Eukaryota
- Kingdom: Animalia
- Phylum: Arthropoda
- Class: Insecta
- Order: Lepidoptera
- Family: Hesperiidae
- Genus: Ephyriades
- Species: E. arcas

Binomial name
- Ephyriades arcas (Drury, 1773)

Synonyms
- Papilio arcas Drury, 1773; Papilio fusco-nigricans Goeze, 1779; Papilio philemon Fabricius, 1775; Papilio otreus Stoll, [1780]; Papilio flyas Stoll, [1780]; Hesperia clericus Fabricius, 1793; Nisoniades astur Plötz, 1884

= Ephyriades arcas =

Species of butterfly

Ephyriades arcas, the Caribbean duskywing, is a butterfly of the family Hesperiidae. It is found in Central America and the Caribbean, the type specimen being described from Saint Kitts.

== Description ==
Upper side: Thorax and abdomen black. Wings very dark brownish black, immaculate. Margins entire. Under side: Legs, breast, and abdomen dark brown, but rather lighter than on the upper side, immaculate, except a small white spot on the anterior, placed near the anterior edge towards the tip.

== Subspecies ==
- Ephyriades arcas arcas
- Ephyriades arcas philemon (Fabricius, 1775) (Cuba, Bahamas)
