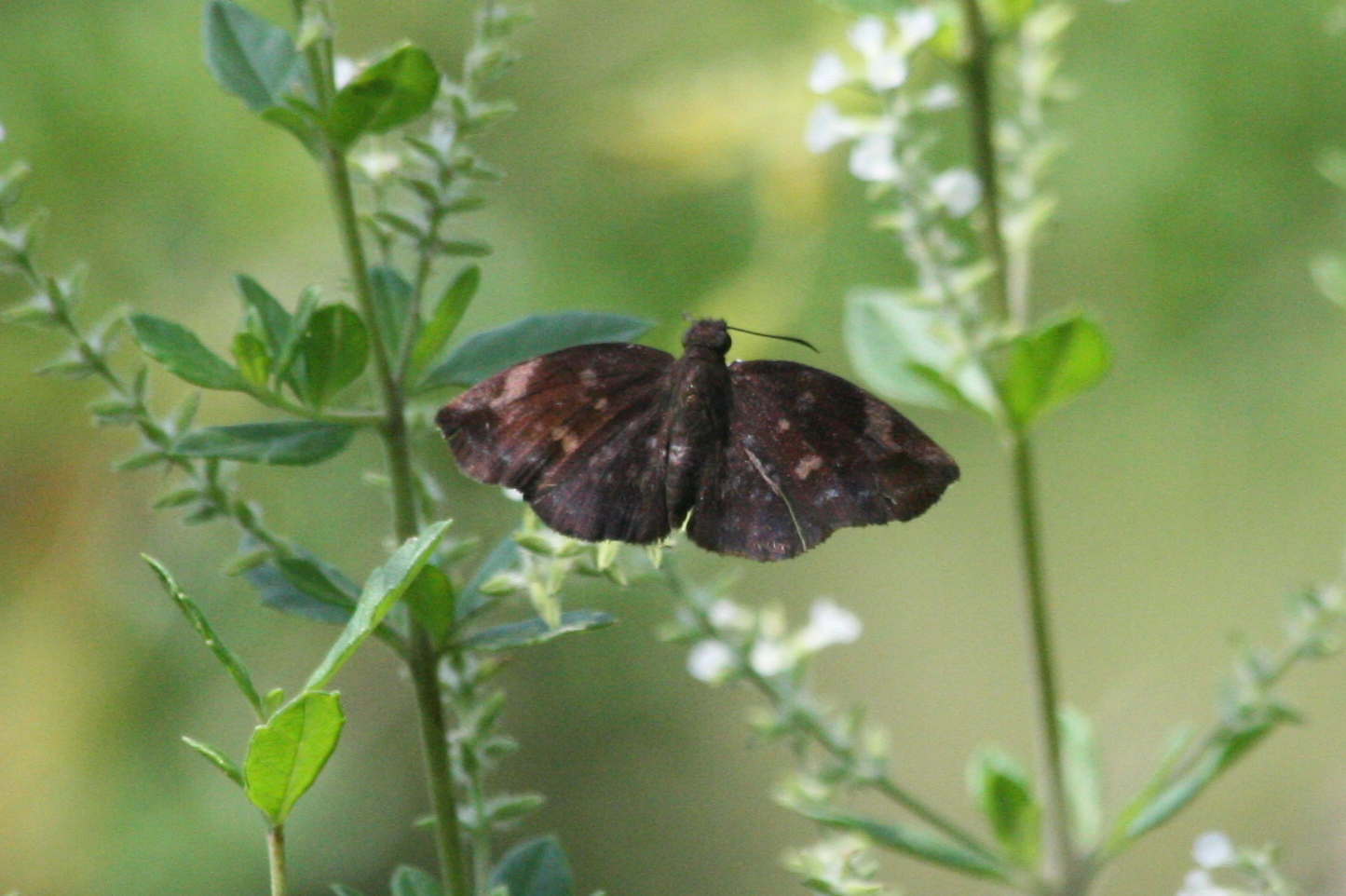
- Male Eantis mithridates

Scientific classification
- Kingdom: Animalia
- Phylum: Arthropoda
- Class: Insecta
- Order: Lepidoptera
- Family: Hesperiidae
- Subfamily: Pyrginae
- Tribe: Achlyodidini; Burmeister, 1878

Diversity
- 15 genera

Synonyms
- Achylodidini (lapsus); Achylodini (lapsus)

= Achlyodidini =

Tribe of butterflies

The Achlyodidini (sometimes – but apparently in error – spelled Achylodidini) are a tribe in the skipper butterfly subfamily Pyrginae. Many species of them are notable for their (by skipper butterfly standards) gaudy colors and the unusually-shaped wings, which look as if the forewing tips have been squarely cut off. They are only found in the Americas, with few occurring out of tropical areas.

Formerly, when only four tribes of Pyrginae were recognized, they were included in the Pyrgini, which at that time contained a massive number of genera. But the Pyrginae have since been reorganized to make them and their tribes monophyletic, leading most modern authors to treat the Achlyodidini as distinct tribe. However, they are the tribe most closely related to the Pyrgini sensu stricto, and the old circumscription of the Pyrgini was by and large just as correct from a phylogenetic perspective.

The other two tribes of the Pyrgini sensu lato – the Carcharodini and Erynnini – are not as strikingly autapomorphic as the Achlyodidini, but they are more distant relatives of the Pyrgini sensu stricto than the present tribe. Thus, they cannot be included in the Pyrgini without also including the Achlyodidini, and consequently the four-way split of the Pyrgini is more informative than to lump half the known evolutionary diversity of Pyrginae into one huge tribe.

== Genera ==
The genera are listed in the presumed phylogenetic sequence:

- Achlyodes
- Aethilla Hewitson, 1868
- Doberes
- Eantis – sicklewings
- Atarnes
- Charidia
- Paramimus
- Milanion
- Haemactis
- Gindanes
- Pythonides
- Quadrus
- Ouleus
- Livida
- Zera
- Eburuncus Grishin, 2012
