= Zera =

Zera may refer to:

- Zera (butterfly), a genus of skipper butterflies
- Zera (character), a supervillain in the Spawn comic book series
- Zera (musician) (born 2002), stage name of Serbian-Austrian singer, rapper and songwriter Marina Pezerović
