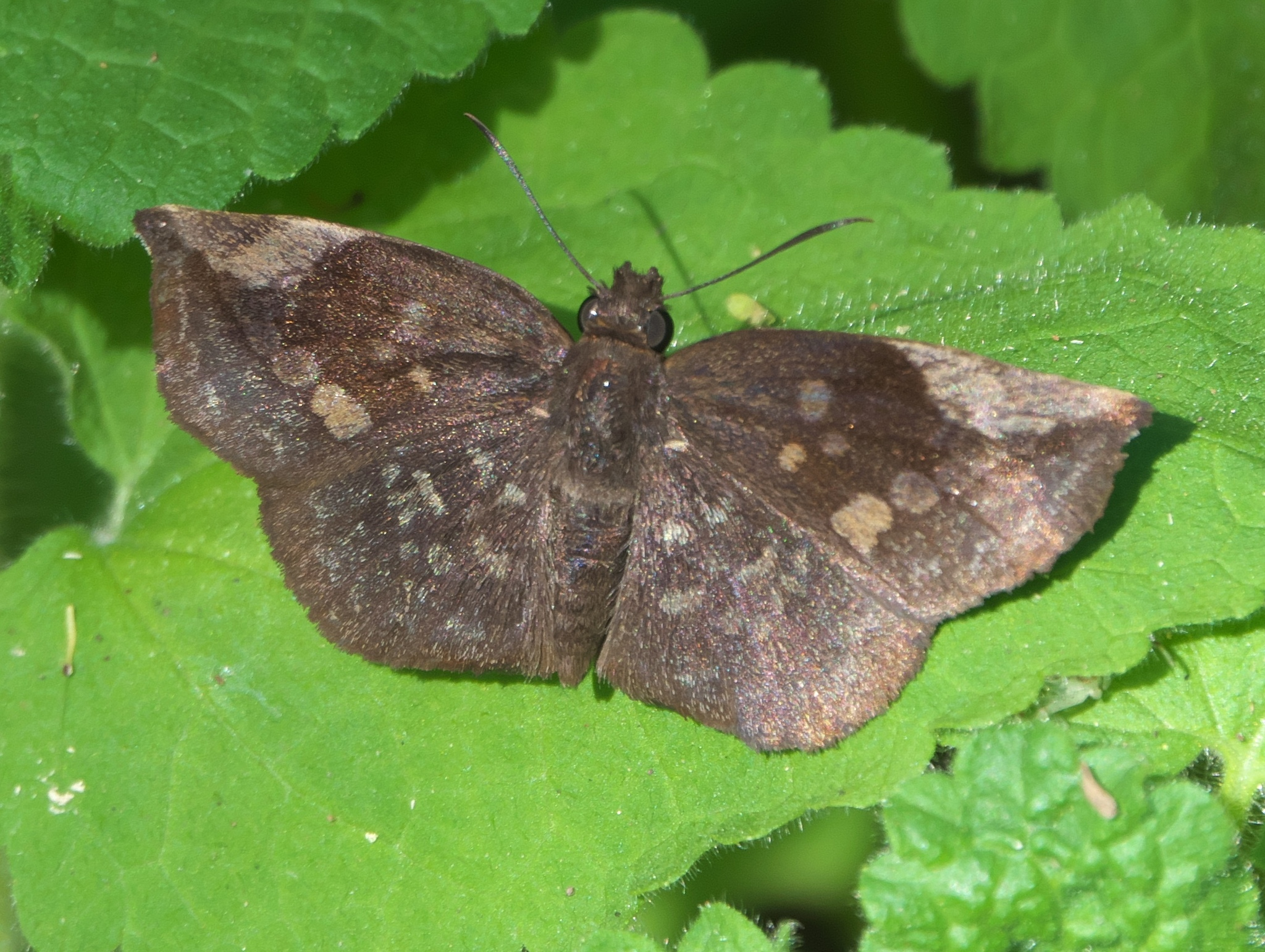
- Eantis tamenund, Texas

Scientific classification
- Kingdom: Animalia
- Phylum: Arthropoda
- Class: Insecta
- Order: Lepidoptera
- Family: Hesperiidae
- Subfamily: Pyrginae
- Tribe: Achylodidini
- Genus: Eantis
- Species: E. tamenund

Binomial name
- Eantis tamenund (W. H. Edwards, 1871)

= Eantis tamenund =

Species of butterfly

Eantis tamenund, the sickle-winged skipper, is a species of spread-wing skipper in the butterfly family Hesperiidae. It is found in Central America, Mexico, the south central United States, and Caribbean countries.
