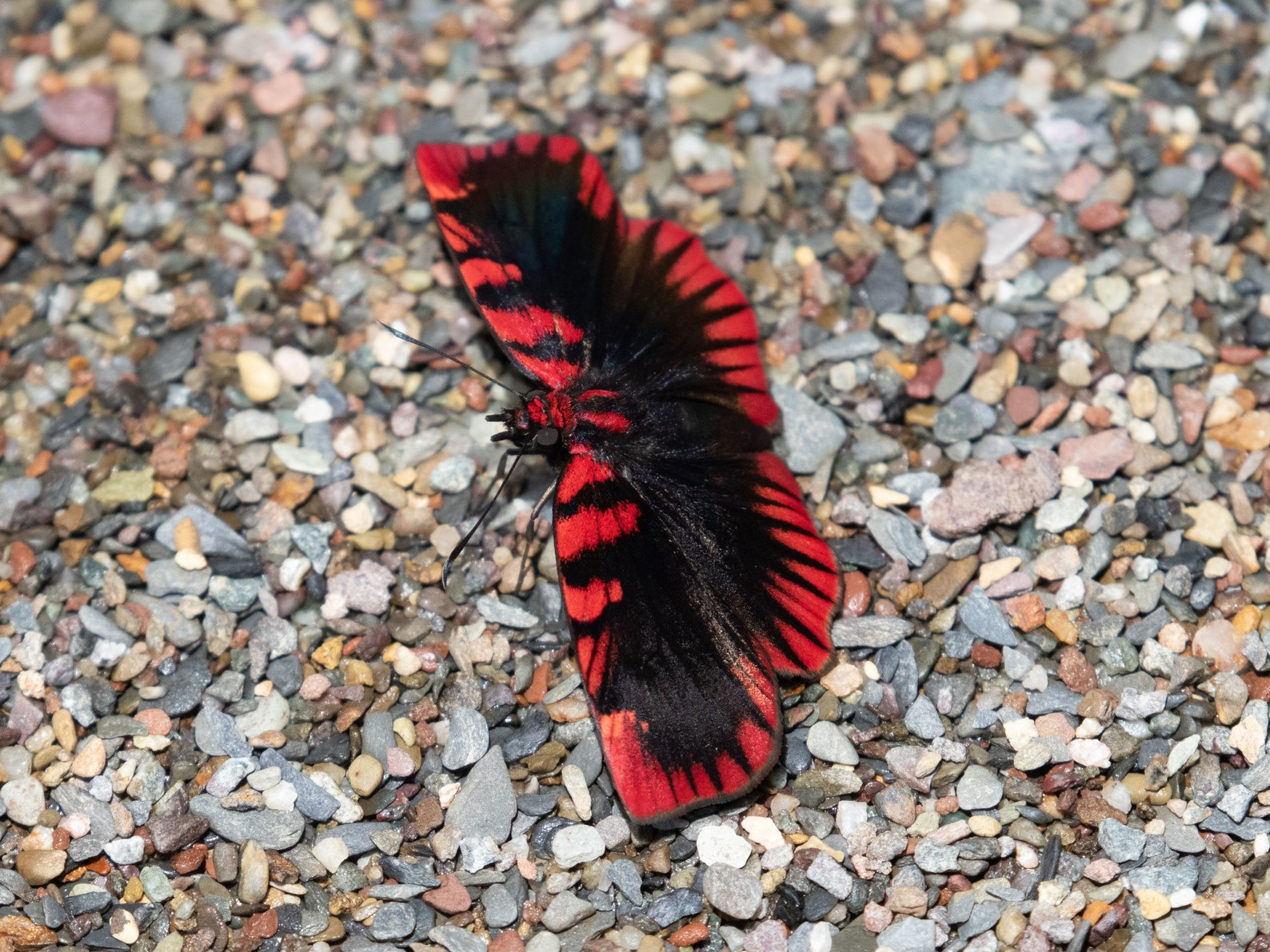
- Haemactis sanguinalis

Scientific classification
- Kingdom: Animalia
- Phylum: Arthropoda
- Class: Insecta
- Order: Lepidoptera
- Family: Hesperiidae
- Tribe: Achlyodidini
- Genus: Haemactis; Mabille, 1903

= Haemactis =

Genus of butterflies

Haemactis is a genus of skippers in the family Hesperiidae.

== Species ==
Recognised species in the genus Haemactis include:

- Haemactis sanguinalis (Westwood, [1852])
