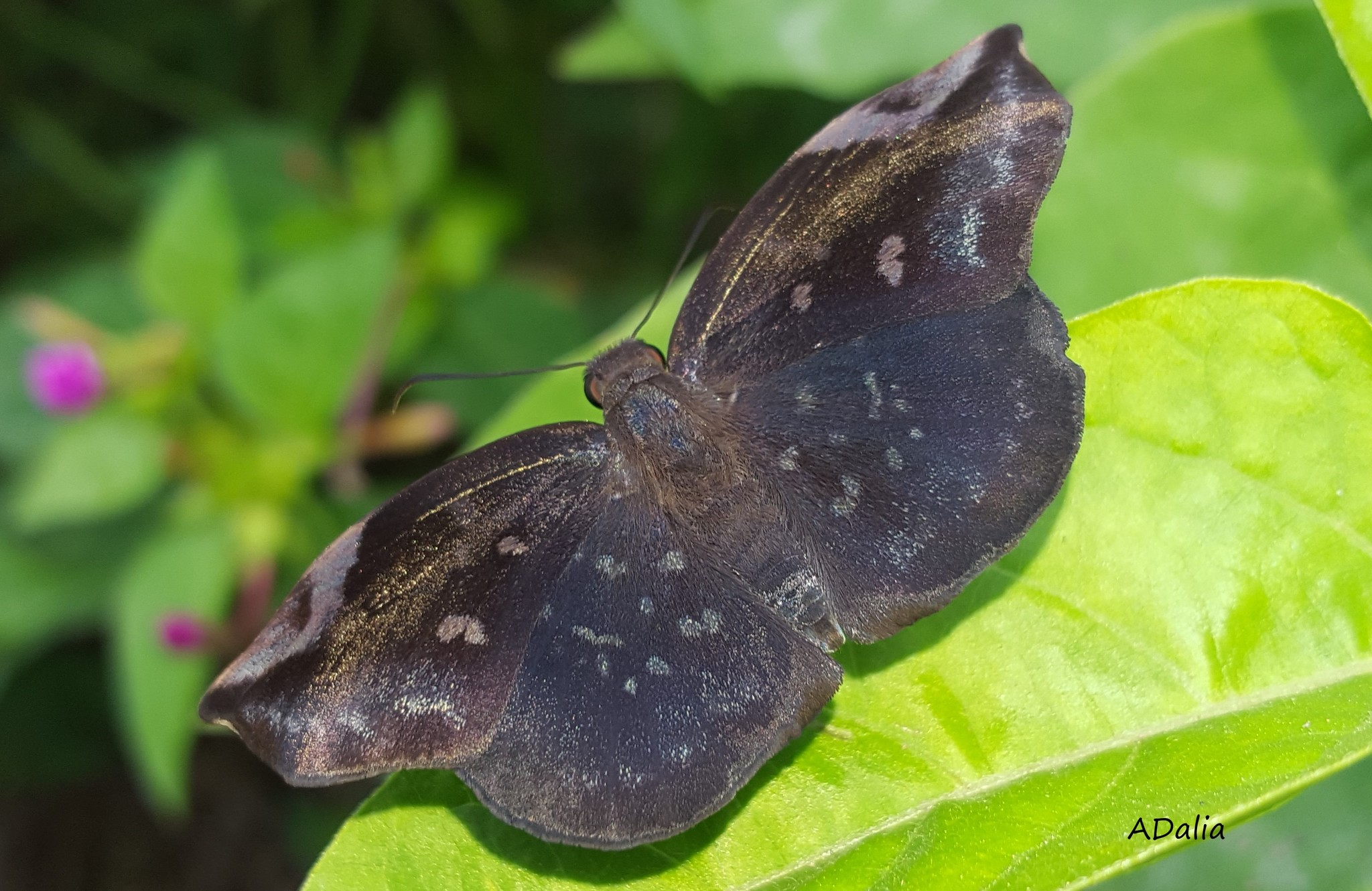
- Eantis thraso, Brazil

Scientific classification
- Kingdom: Animalia
- Phylum: Arthropoda
- Class: Insecta
- Order: Lepidoptera
- Family: Hesperiidae
- Genus: Eantis
- Species: E. thraso

Binomial name
- Eantis thraso (Hübner, 1807)

= Eantis thraso =

Species of butterfly

Eantis thraso is a species of spread-wing skipper in the butterfly family Hesperiidae. It is found in Central America, South America, and the Caribbean.
