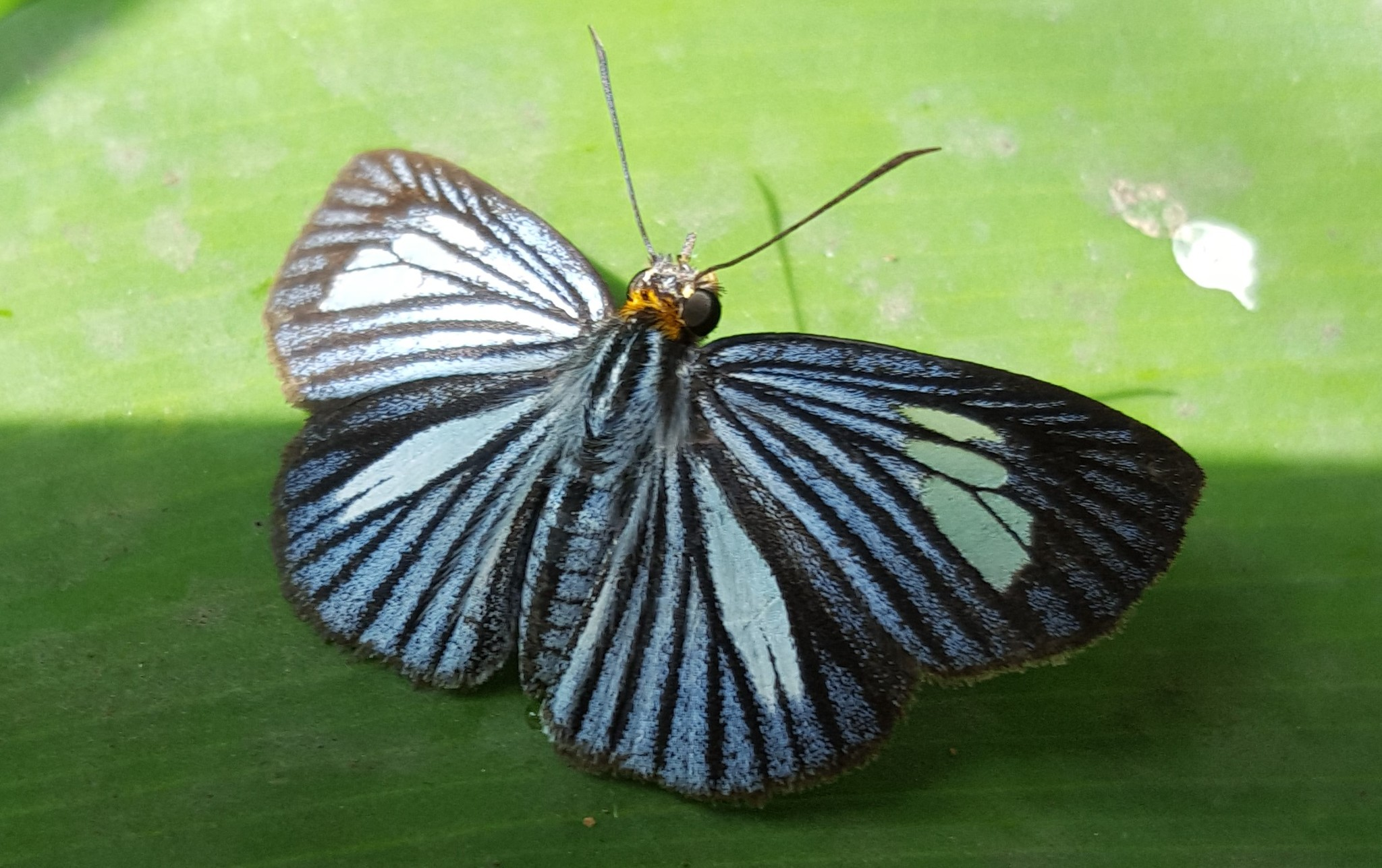
- Pythonides lancea observed in Brazil in 2018

Scientific classification
- Kingdom: Animalia
- Phylum: Arthropoda
- Class: Insecta
- Order: Lepidoptera
- Family: Hesperiidae
- Genus: Pythonides
- Species: P. lancea

Binomial name
- Pythonides lancea (Hewitson, 1868)

Synonyms
- Leucochitonea lancea 1868

= Pythonides lancea =

Species of butterfly

Pythonides lancea is a species of butterfly in the skipper family, found in Brazil and in Argentina.

Pythonides lancea was first described in 1868 by William Chapman Hewitson and named Leucochitonea lancea, after realizing this species was different from P. jovianus previously described by Pieter Cramer.

== Gallery ==
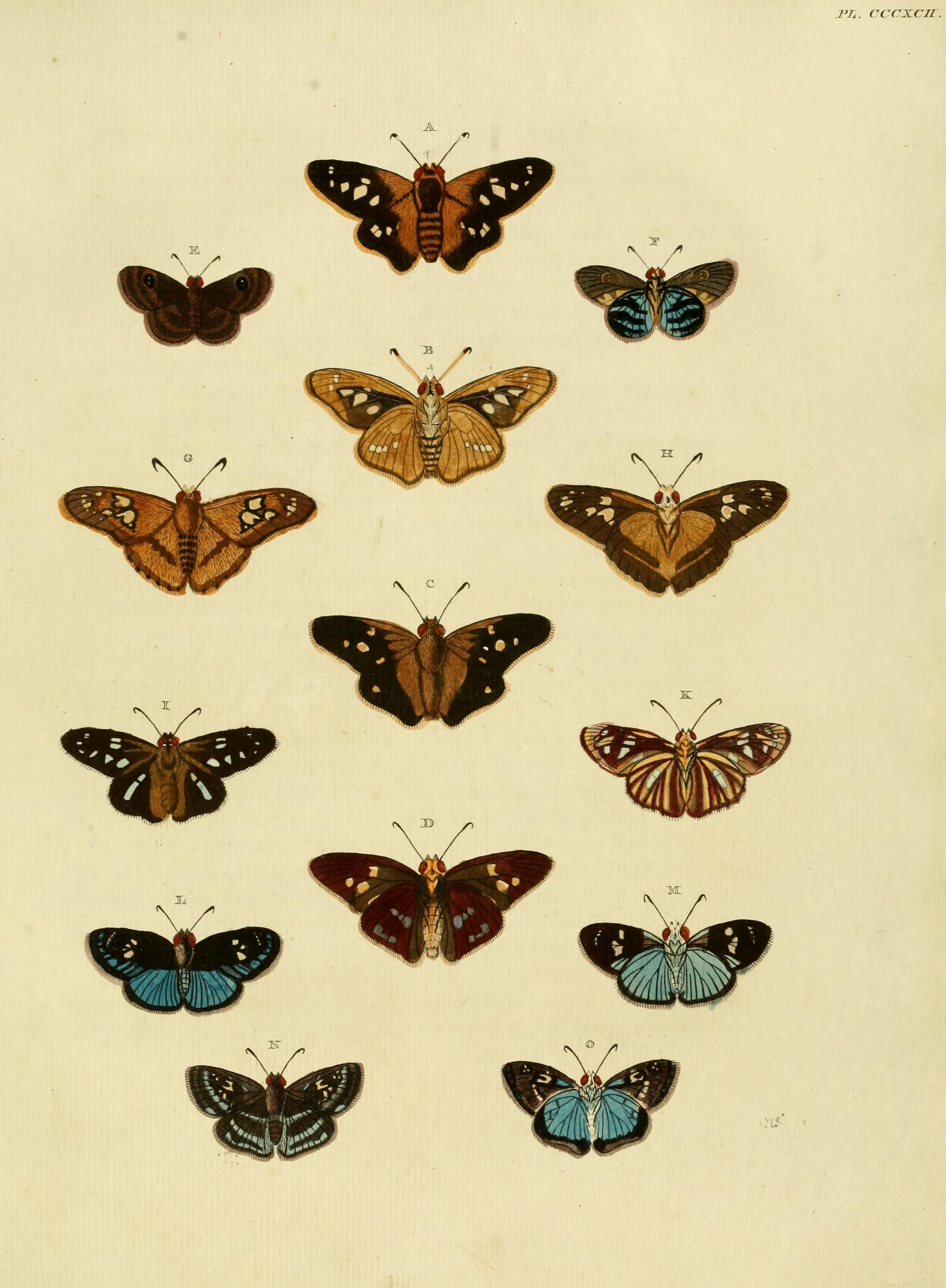
P. jovianus (L,M) in a plate from Cramer & Stoll (1782).

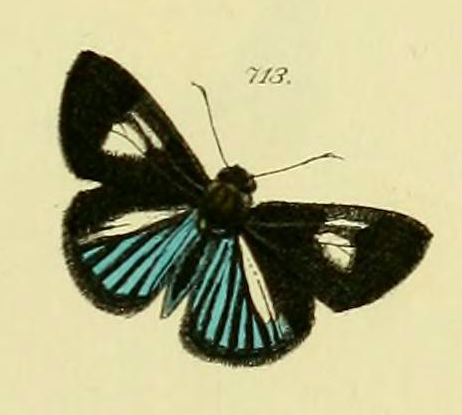
P. lancea from Hübner & Geyer (1908).

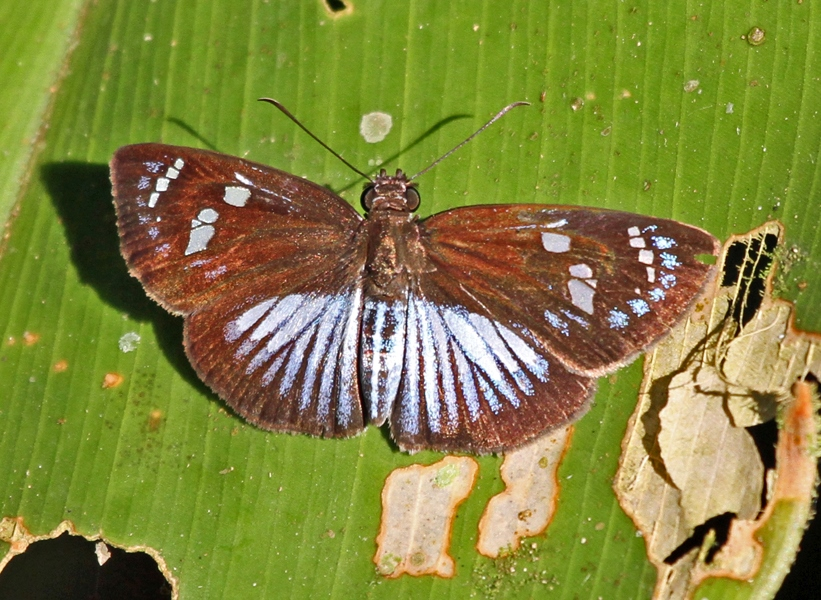
P. jovianus observed in Cacoal, Brazil.

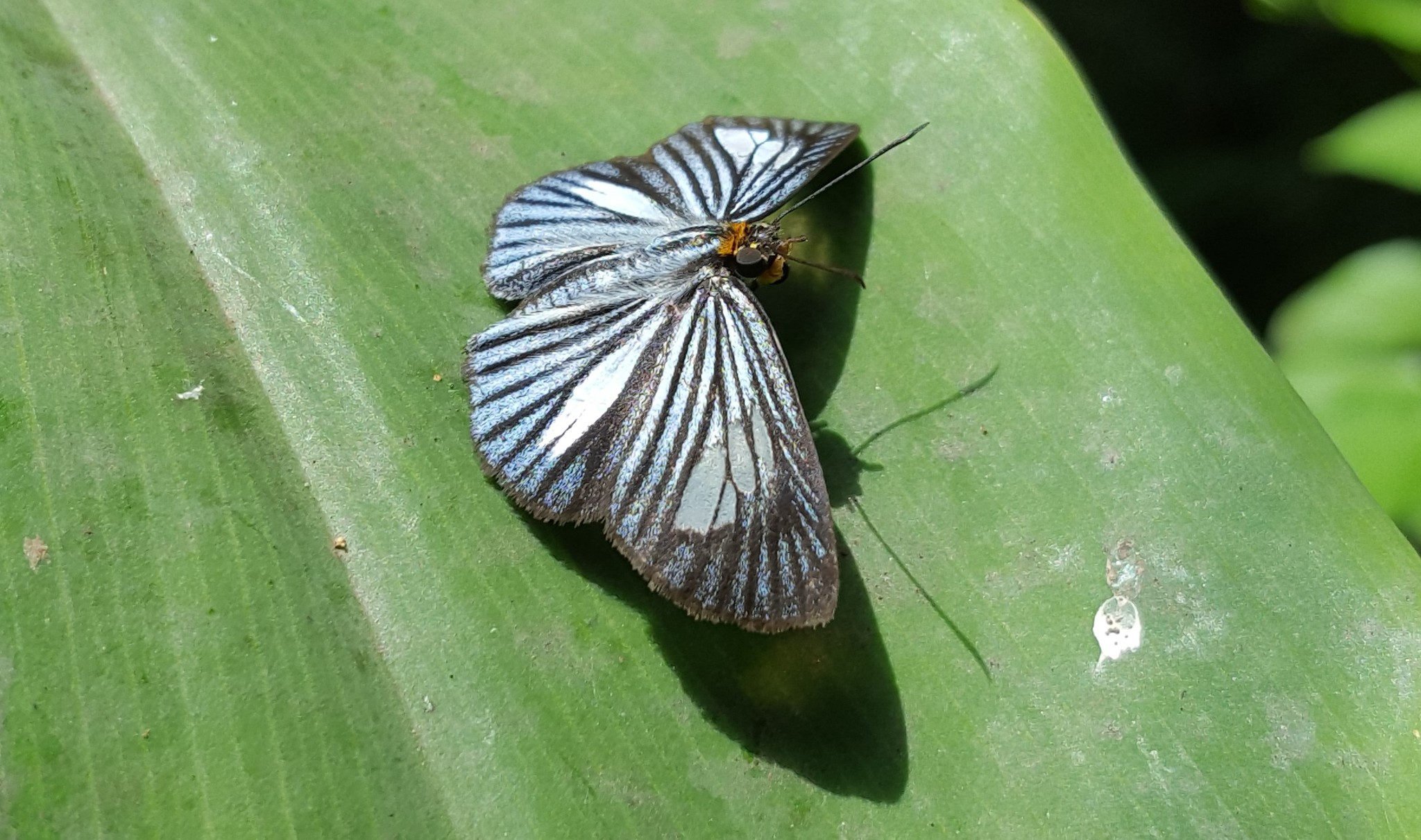
P. lancea observed in Guarapiranga, Brazil.
