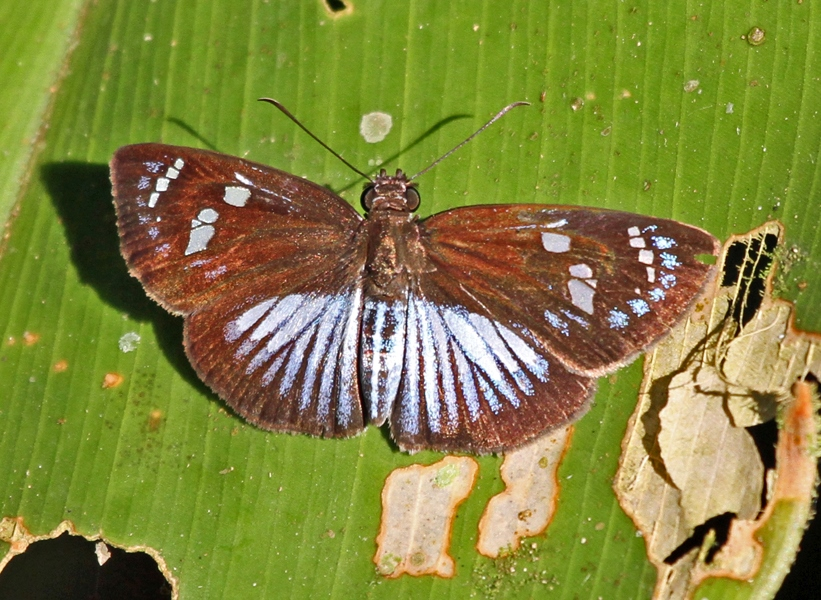
- Pythonides jovianus in Cacoal, Rondônia, Brazil

Scientific classification
- Kingdom: Animalia
- Phylum: Arthropoda
- Class: Insecta
- Order: Lepidoptera
- Family: Hesperiidae
- Subfamily: Pyrginae
- Tribe: Achylodidini
- Genus: Pythonides; Hübner, [1819]

= Pythonides =

Genus of butterflies

Pythonides is a genus of skippers.

== Species ==
Recognised species include:

- Pythonides amaryllis Staudinger, 1876
- Pythonides jovianus Stoll, 1782
- Pythonides lancea Hewitson, 1868
- Pythonides lerina Hewitson, 1868
