= Charidia =

Scientific classification
- Kingdom: Animalia
- Phylum: Arthropoda
- Class: Insecta
- Order: Lepidoptera
- Family: Hesperiidae
- Tribe: Achlyodidini
- Genus: Charidia; Mabille, 1903

Genus of butterflies

Charidia is a genus of skippers in the family Hesperiidae.

== Species ==
Recognised species in the genus Charidia include:

- Charidia lucaria (Hewitson, 1868)
