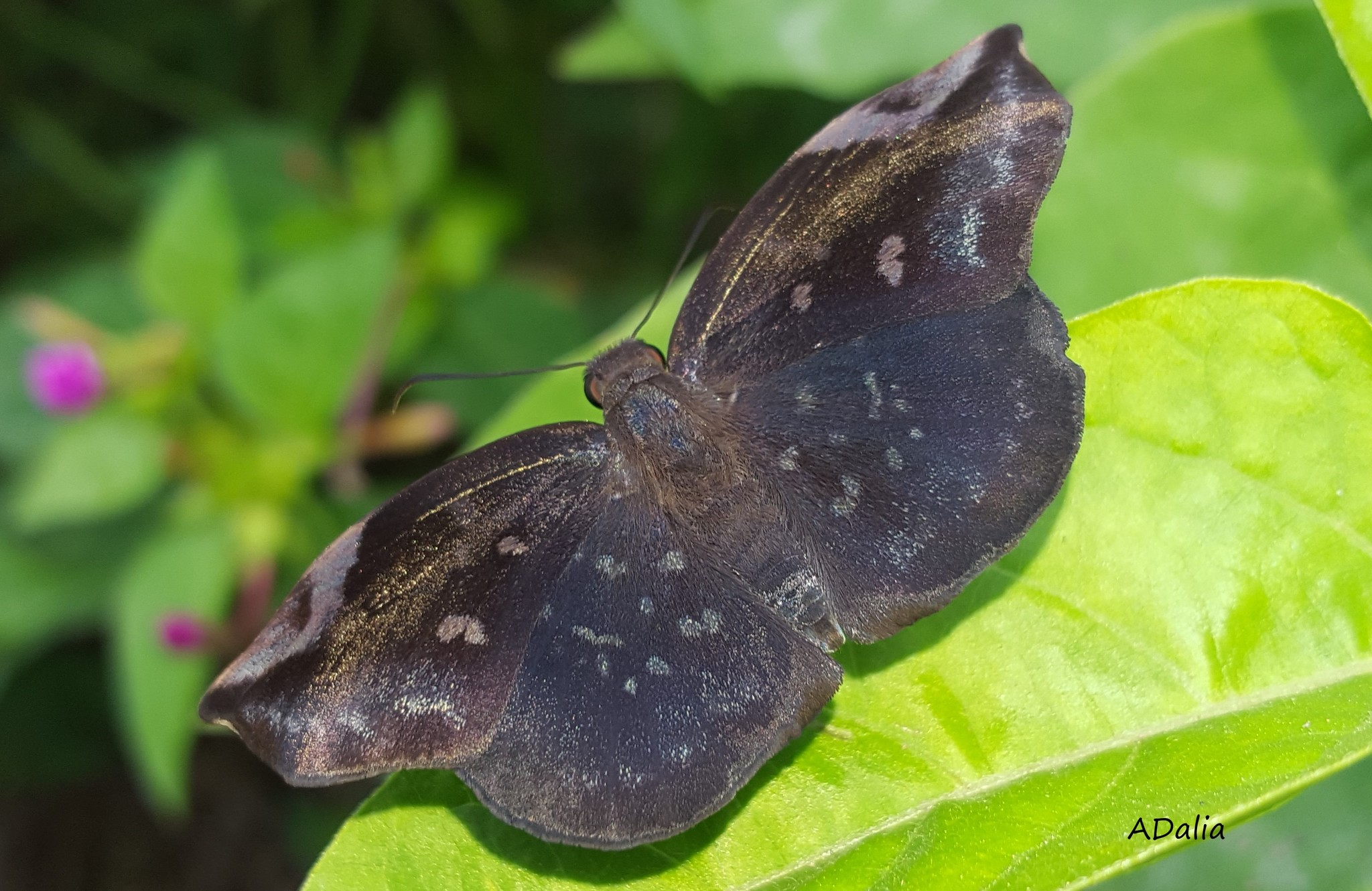
- E. thraso, Brazil
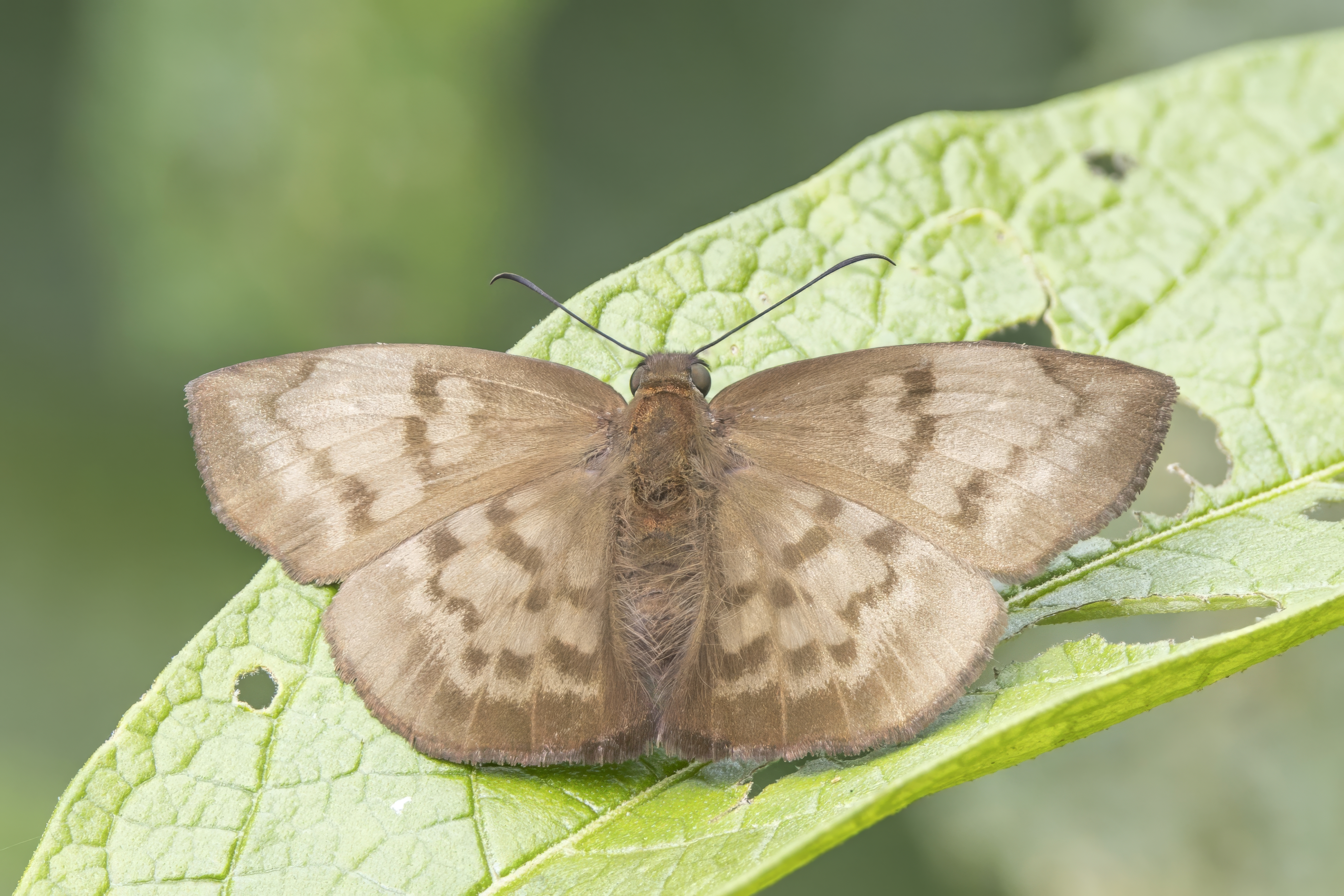
- E. pallida, Ecuador

Scientific classification
- Kingdom: Animalia
- Phylum: Arthropoda
- Class: Insecta
- Order: Lepidoptera
- Family: Hesperiidae
- Tribe: Achylodidini
- Genus: Eantis; Boisduval, 1836

Synonyms
- Tosta Evans, 1953

= Eantis =

Genus of butterflies

Eantis is a genus of skippers in the family Hesperiidae.

== Species ==
Recognised species in the genus Eantis include:

- Eantis minna Evans, 1953
- Eantis minor Comstock, 1944
- Eantis mithridates (Fabricius, 1793)
- Eantis munroei Bell, 1956
- Eantis pallida (R. Felder, 1869)
- Eantis tamenund Edwards, 1871
- Eantis thraso Hübner, [1807]
- Eantis tosta (Evans, 1953)
