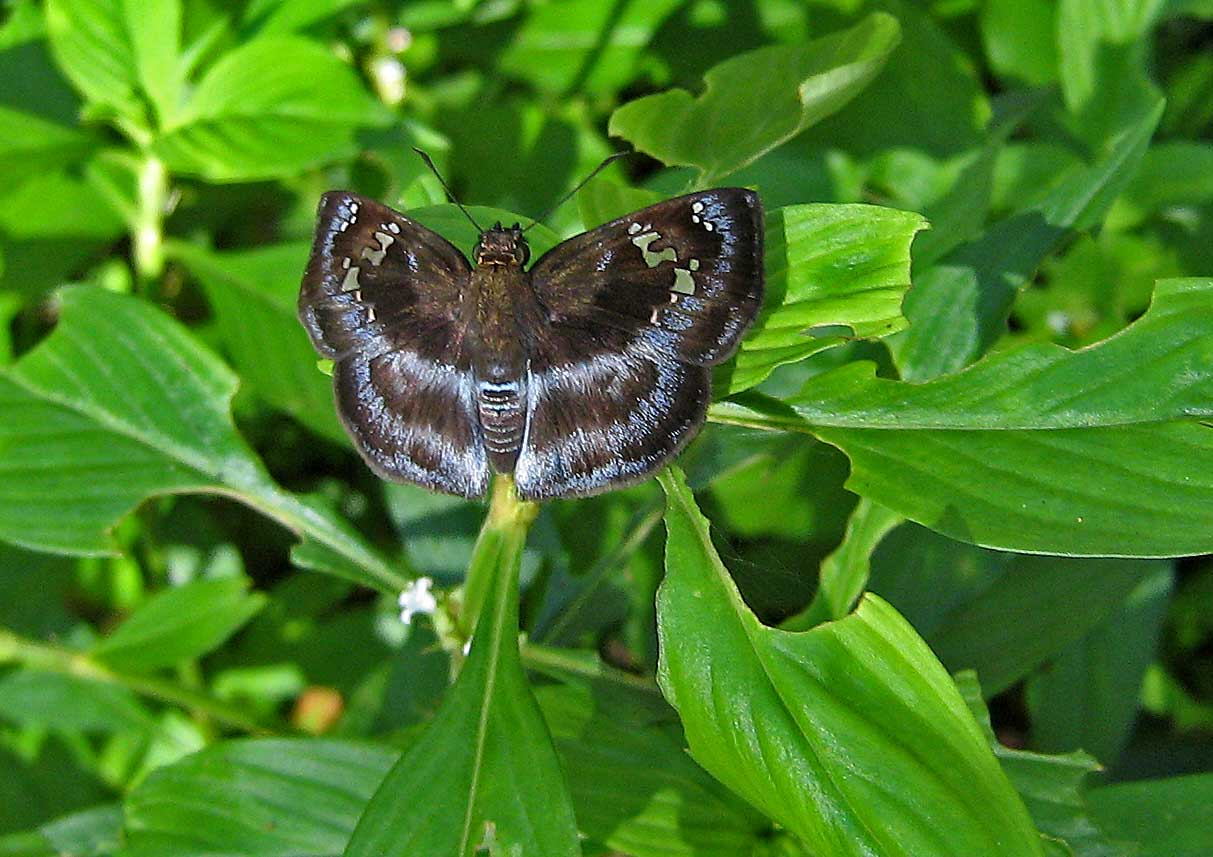
- Male, dorsal
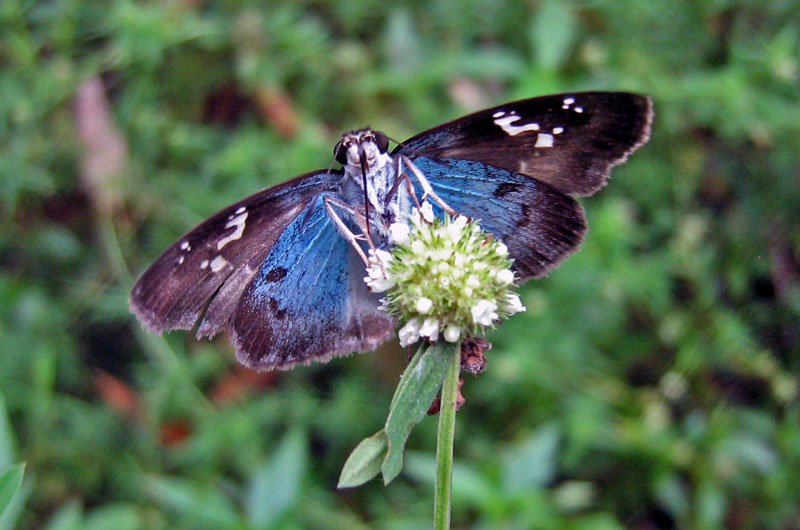
- Male, ventral

Scientific classification
- Kingdom: Animalia
- Phylum: Arthropoda
- Class: Insecta
- Order: Lepidoptera
- Family: Hesperiidae
- Genus: Quadrus
- Species: Q. cerialis

Binomial name
- Quadrus cerialis (Stoll, [1782])

Synonyms
- Papilio cerialis Stoll, [1782]; Pythonides cerialis; Hesperia orcus Fabricius, 1793; Pythonides cerberus Hübner, [1819]; Pythonides cerialis f. majorinus Draudt, 1922

= Quadrus cerialis =

Species of butterfly

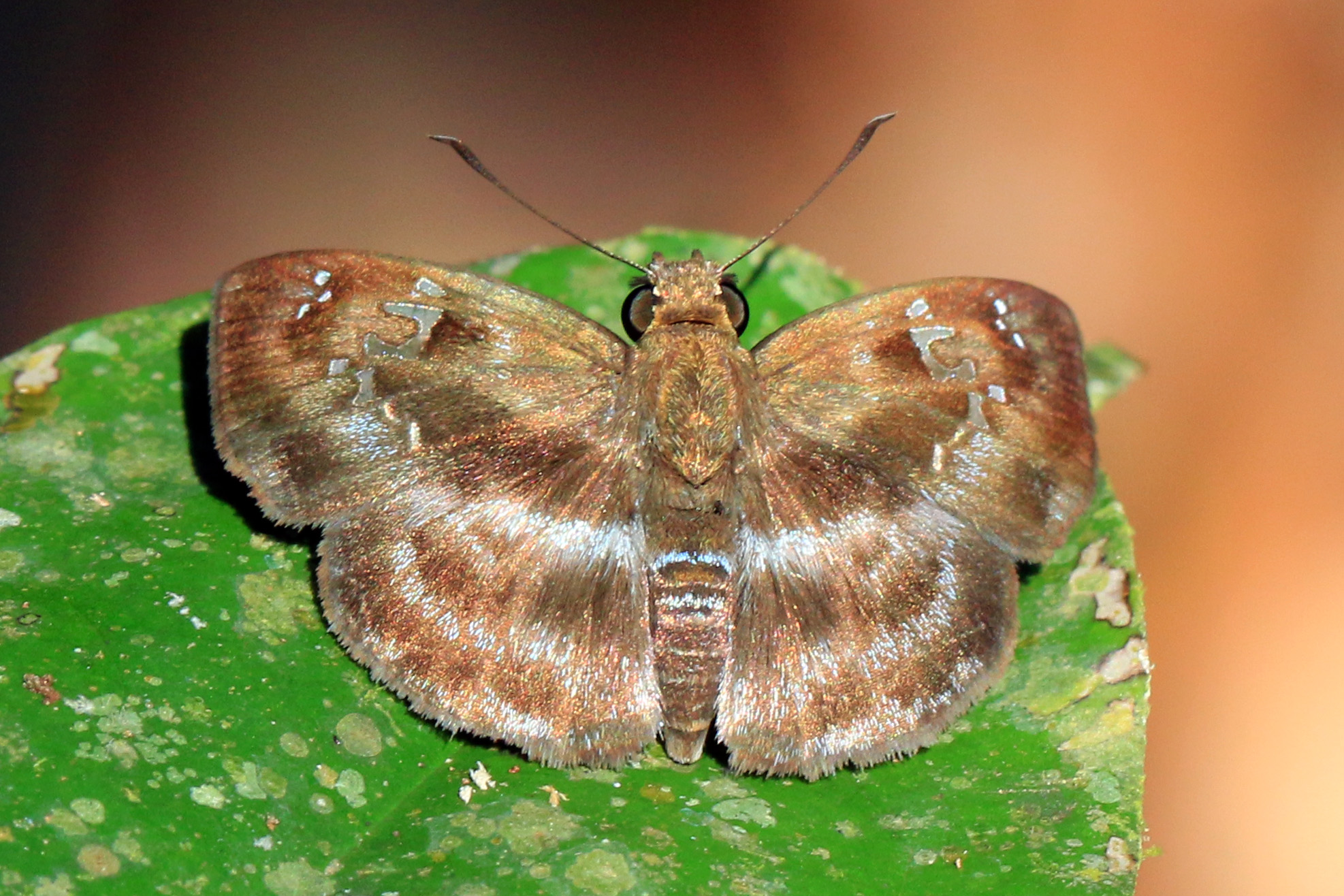
Female, dorsal side Cristalino River, Southern Amazon, Brazil

Quadrus cerialis, the common blue-skipper or peppered blue skipper, is a butterfly of the family Hesperiidae. It is found from Panama to Bolivia. The habitat consists of rainforests, cloud forests and humid deciduous forests at altitudes up to 1,400 metres.
