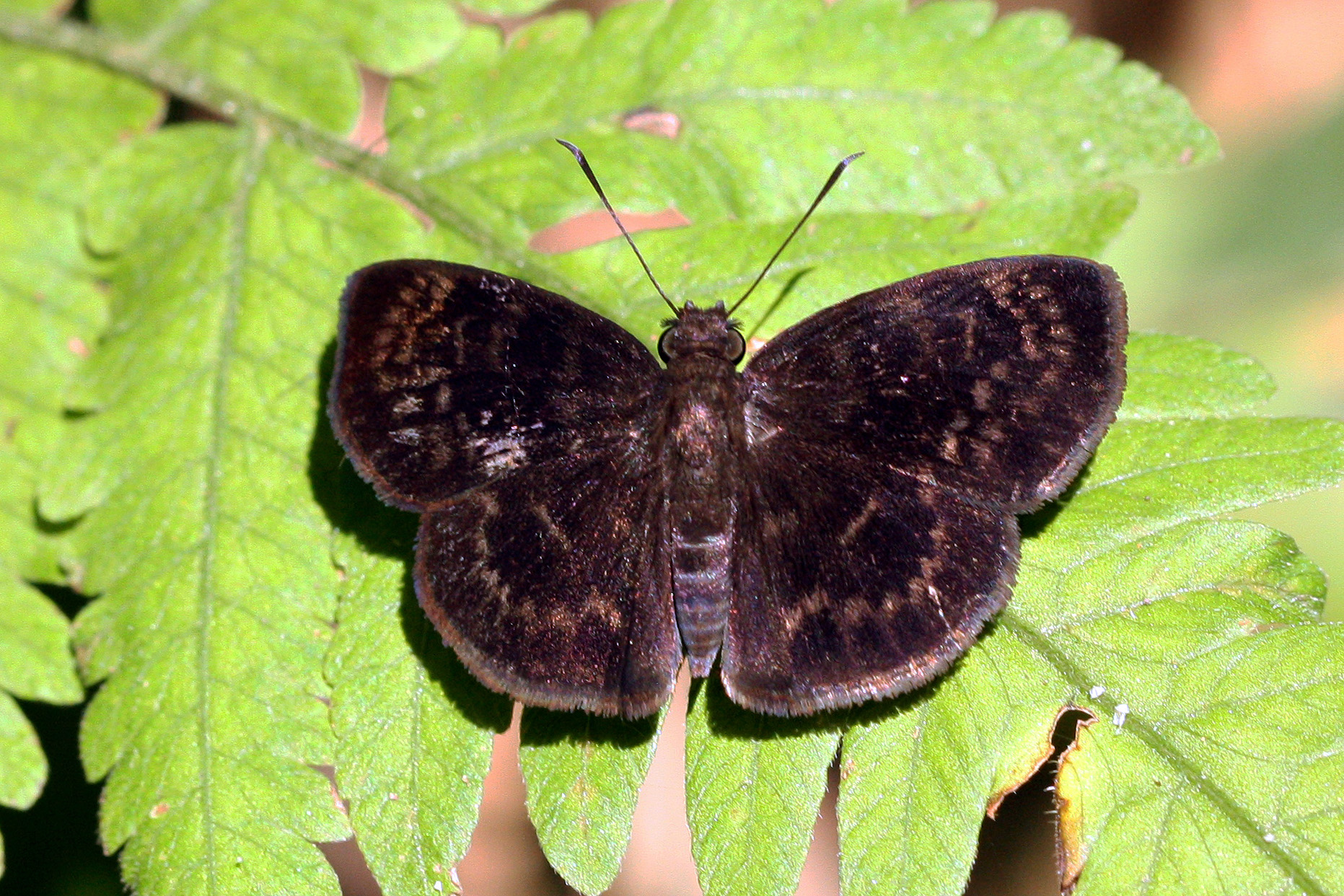
- O. fridericus, Trinidad

Scientific classification
- Kingdom: Animalia
- Phylum: Arthropoda
- Class: Insecta
- Order: Lepidoptera
- Family: Hesperiidae
- Tribe: Achlyodidini
- Genus: Ouleus; Lindsey, 1925

= Ouleus =

Genus of butterflies

Ouleus is a genus of skippers in the family Hesperiidae.
