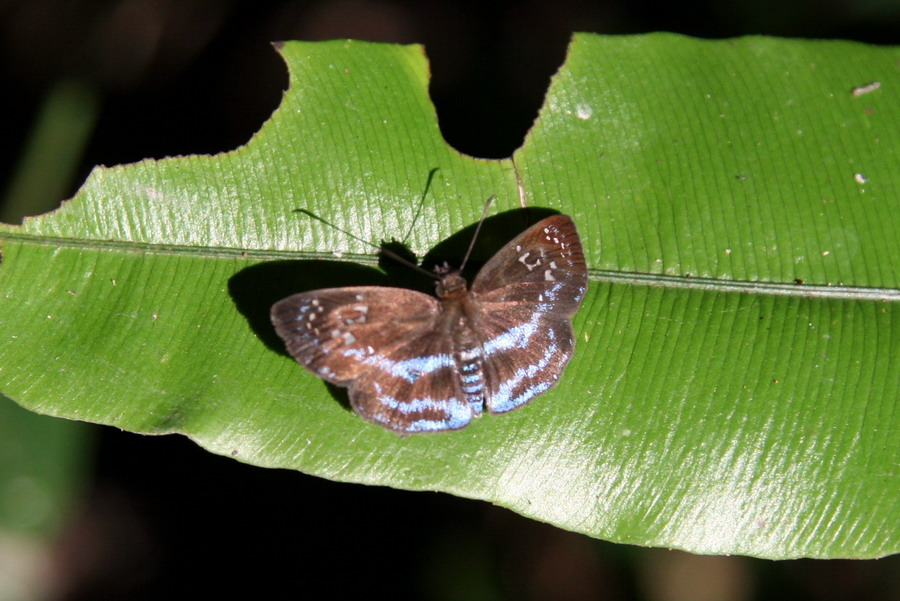
- Quadrus contubernalis contubernalis

Scientific classification
- Kingdom: Animalia
- Phylum: Arthropoda
- Clade: Pancrustacea
- Class: Insecta
- Order: Lepidoptera
- Family: Hesperiidae
- Genus: Quadrus
- Species: Q. contubernalis

Binomial name
- Quadrus contubernalis Mabille, 1883

Synonyms
- Pythonides contubernalis Pythonides praxis

= Quadrus contubernalis =

Species of butterfly

Quadrus contubernalis is a species of skipper. It was first described by Paul Mabille in 1883.

== Description ==
The wings of Quadrus contubernalis are brown, with two blue stripes on the hindwings. The larvae can range from 10 to 35 millimeters long, and are known to feed on the pepper Piper pseudolindenii.

== Distribution ==
The species is found throughout Central America and northern South America, being found as far north as Mexico and as far south as Brazil.

== Subspecies ==
Two subspecies, Quadrus contubernalis contubernalis (Plötz, 1884) and Quadrus contubernalis anicius (Godman & Salvin, 1894), are known to exist.
