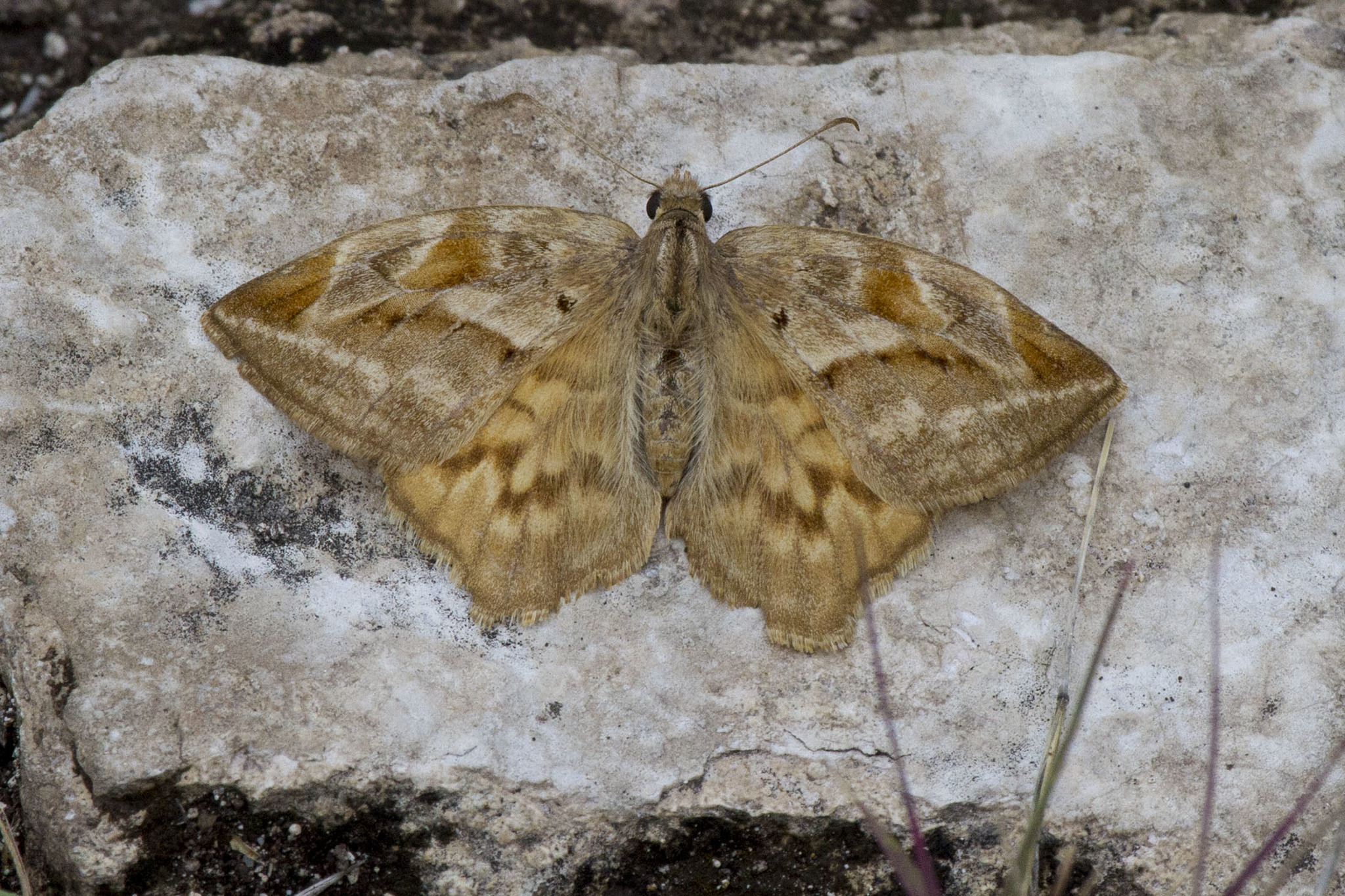
- Doberes hewitsonius

Scientific classification
- Kingdom: Animalia
- Phylum: Arthropoda
- Class: Insecta
- Order: Lepidoptera
- Family: Hesperiidae
- Tribe: Achlyodidini
- Genus: Doberes; Godman & Salvin, [1895]

= Doberes =

Genus of butterflies

Doberes is a genus of butterflies in the family Hesperiidae.

== Species ==
Recognised species in the genus Doberes include:

- Doberes anticus (Plötz, 1884)
