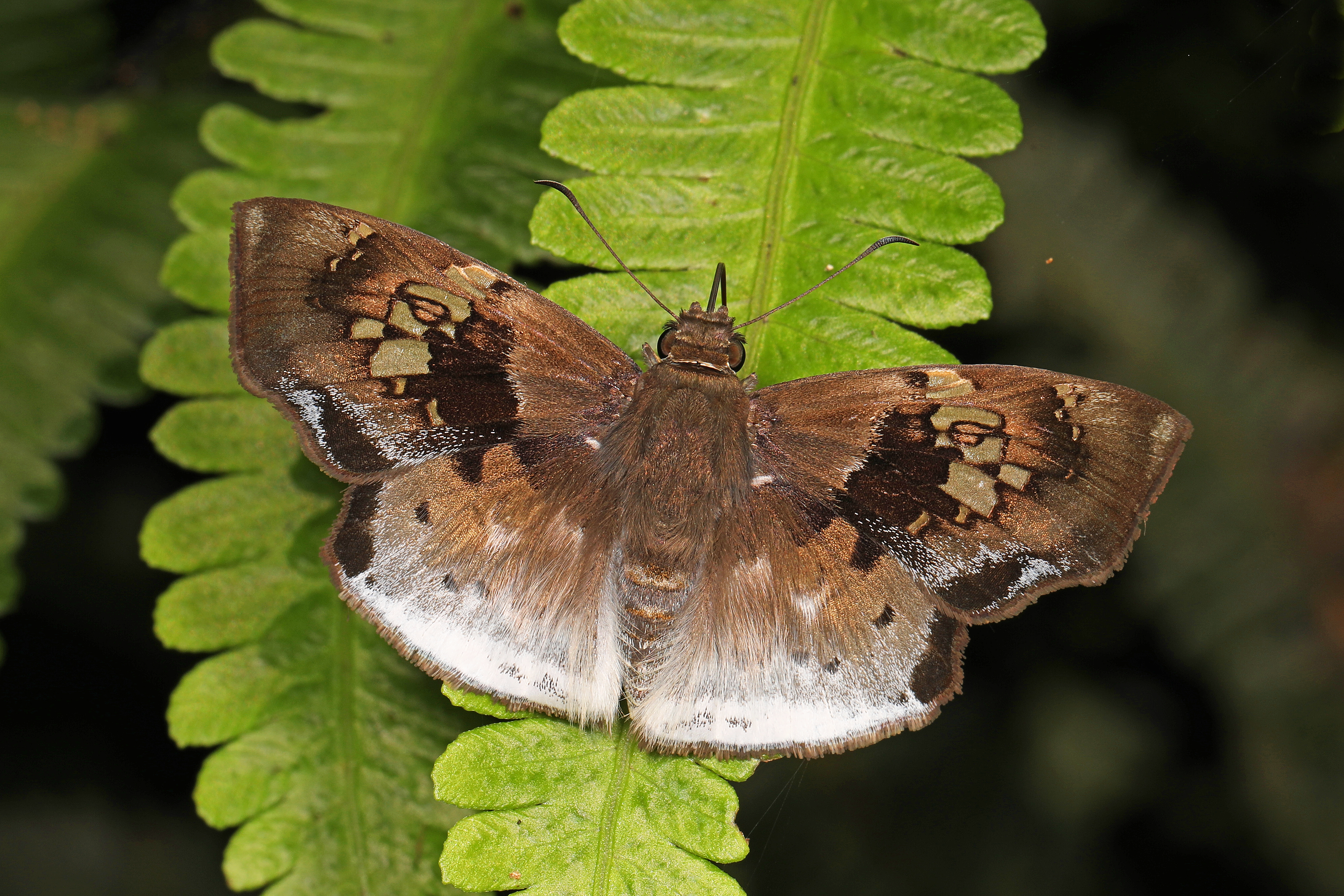
- Gindanes brebisson

Scientific classification
- Kingdom: Animalia
- Phylum: Arthropoda
- Class: Insecta
- Order: Lepidoptera
- Family: Hesperiidae
- Tribe: Achylodidini
- Genus: Gindanes; Godman & Salvin, [1895]

= Gindanes =

Genus of butterflies

Gindanes is a genus of skippers in the family Hesperiidae.

== Species ==
Recognised species in the genus Gindanes include:

- Gindanes brebisson Latreille, [1824]
- Gindanes brontinus Godman & Salvin, [1895]
- Gindanes kelso (Evans, 1953)
