= Paramimus =

Scientific classification
- Kingdom: Animalia
- Phylum: Arthropoda
- Class: Insecta
- Order: Lepidoptera
- Family: Hesperiidae
- Tribe: Achylodidini
- Genus: Paramimus; Hübner, [1819]

Genus of butterflies

Paramimus is a genus of skippers in the family Hesperiidae.
