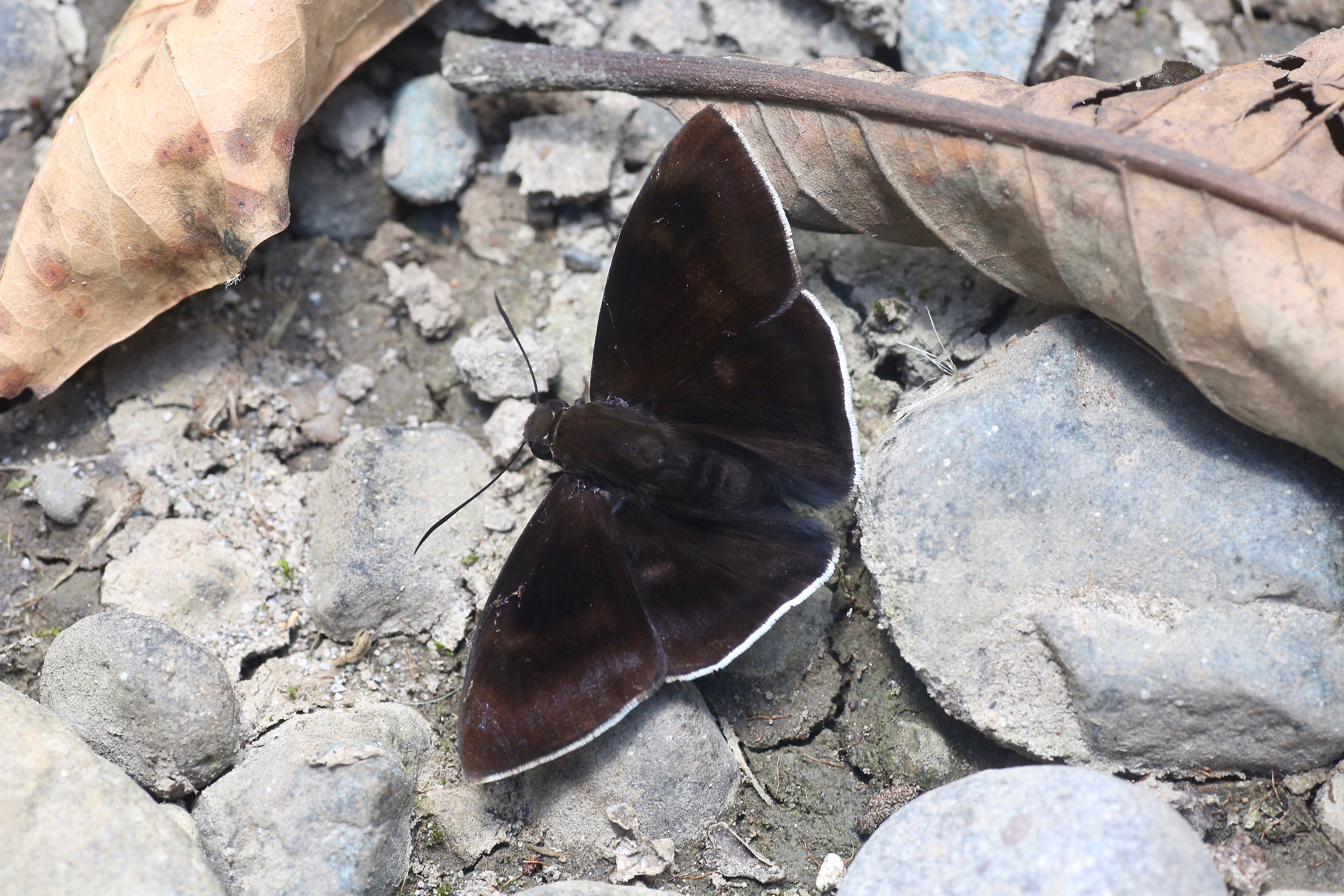
- Aethilla epicra from Ecuador, Mindo

Scientific classification
- Kingdom: Animalia
- Phylum: Arthropoda
- Class: Insecta
- Order: Lepidoptera
- Family: Hesperiidae
- Tribe: Achlyodidini
- Genus: Aethilla; Hewitson, 1868

Synonyms
- Eurypterus Mabille, 1877

= Aethilla (butterfly) =

Genus of butterflies

Aethilla is a Neotropical genus of spread-winged skippers in the family Hesperiidae.

== Species ==
- Aethilla chiapa (Freeman, 1969) — Mexico
- Aethilla echina (Hewitson, 1870) — Mexico to Colombia
  - A. echina echina — Ecuador
  - A. echina coracina (Butler, 1870) — Brazil
- Aethilla eleusinia (Hewitson, 1868) — Ecuador
- Aethilla epicra (Hewitson, 1870) — Ecuador, Colombia
- Aethilla gigas (Mabille, 1877) — Ecuador, Peru
- Aethilla haber (Mabille, 1891) — Peru
- Aethilla later (Mabille, 1891) — Peru
- Aethilla lavochrea (Butler, 1872) — Mexico, Costa Rica, Panama
- Aethilla melas (Plötz, 1882) — Brazil
- Aethilla memmius (Butler, 1870) — Venezuela
