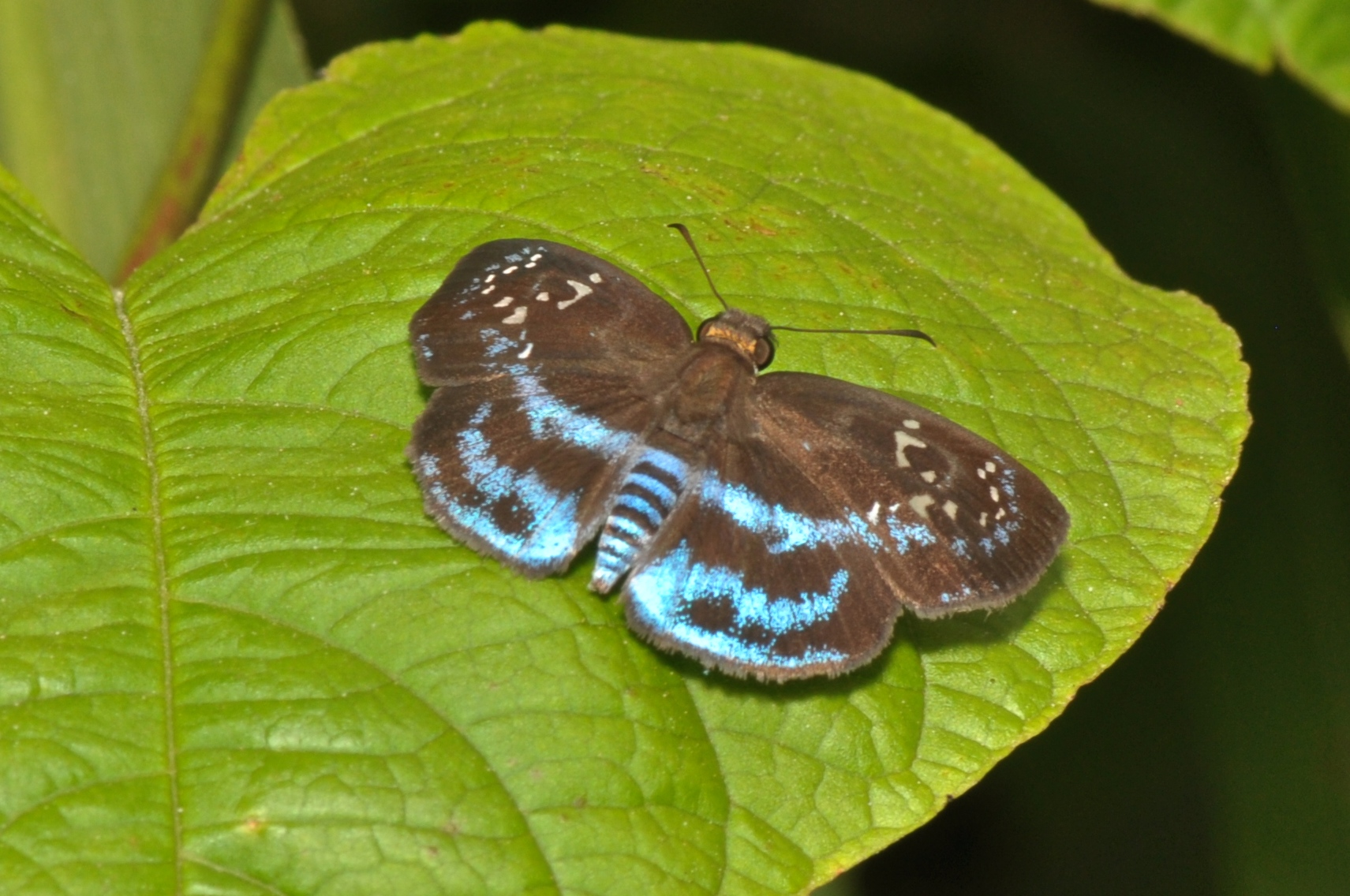
- Q. c. cerialis, Ecuador
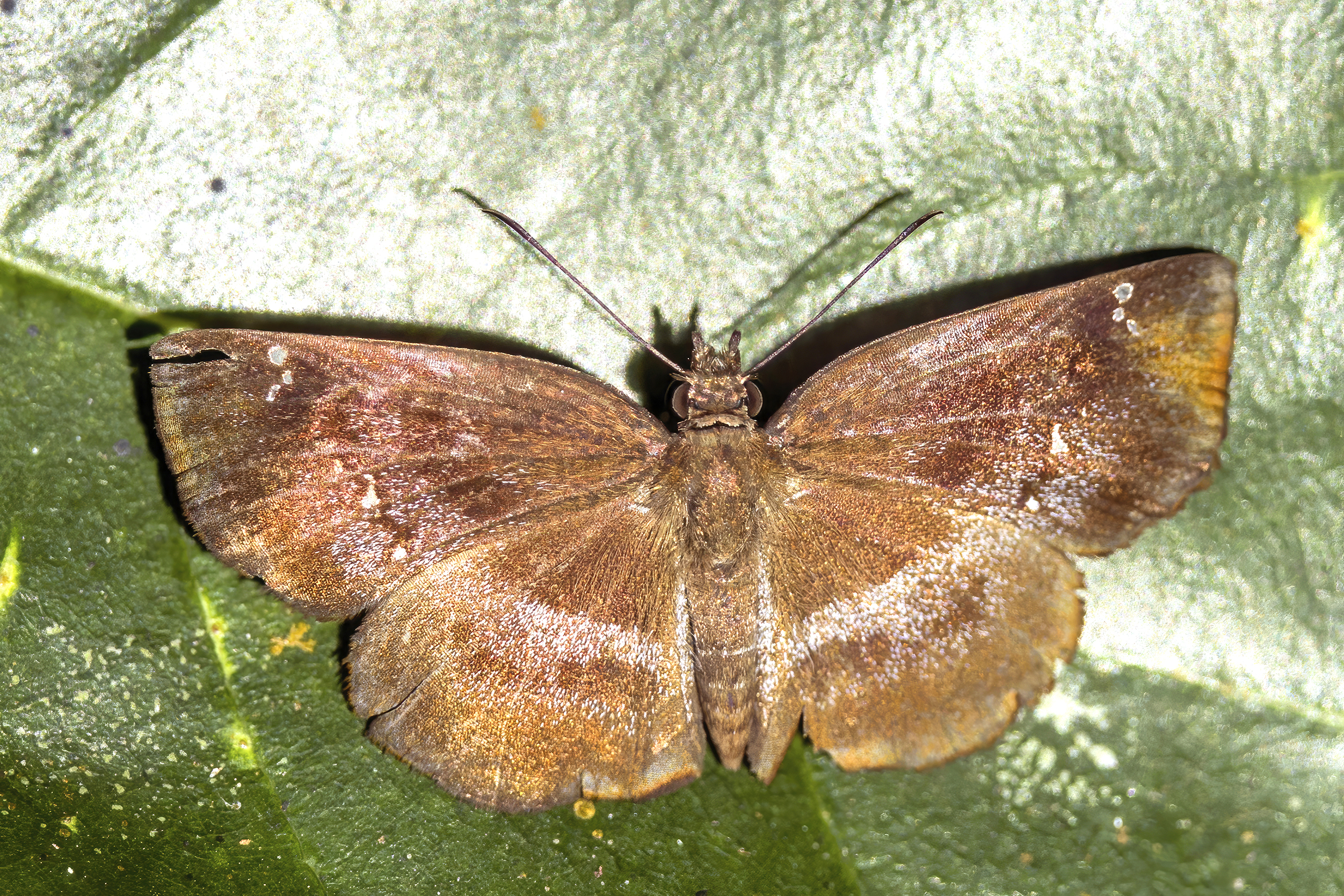
- Q. c. contubernalis, Belize

Scientific classification
- Kingdom: Animalia
- Phylum: Arthropoda
- Class: Insecta
- Order: Lepidoptera
- Family: Hesperiidae
- Tribe: Achylodidini
- Genus: Quadrus; Lindsey, 1925

Species
- See text

= Quadrus =

Genus of butterflies

Quadrus is a genus of skippers in the family Hesperiidae.

== Species ==
- Quadrus cerialis (Stoll, [1782])
- Quadrus contubernalis (Mabille, 1883)
- Quadrus deyrollei (Mabille, 1887)
- Quadrus fanda Evans, 1953
- Quadrus francesius Freeman, 1969
- Quadrus ineptus (Draudt, 1922)
- Quadrus jacobus (Plötz, 1884)
- Quadrus lugubris (R. Felder, 1869)
- Quadrus tros Evans, 1953
- Quadrus truncata (Hewitson, 1870)
- Quadrus u-lucida (Plötz, 1884)
