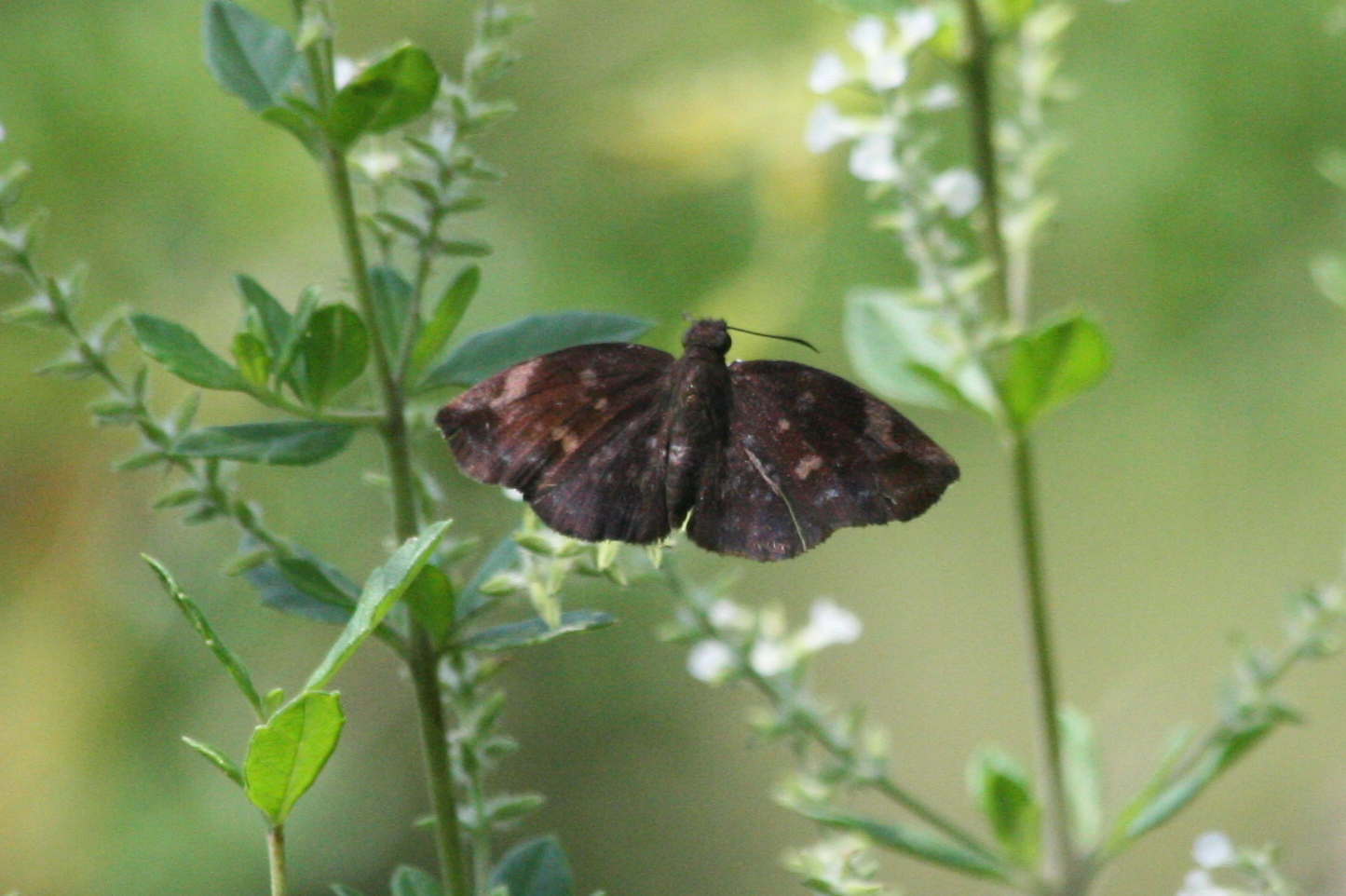
- Male

Scientific classification
- Kingdom: Animalia
- Phylum: Arthropoda
- Class: Insecta
- Order: Lepidoptera
- Family: Hesperiidae
- Genus: Eantis
- Species: E. mithridates

Binomial name
- Eantis mithridates (Fabricius, 1793)

Synonyms
- List: Hesperia mithridates Fabricius, 1793; Achlyodes mithridates; Achlyodes janus Bell & Comstock, 1948; Hesperia tamenund Edwards, 1871; Achlyodes papinianus; Achlyodes tamenund; Eantis tamenund; Urbanus vetus thraso Hübner, [1807]; Eantis peruvianus Mabille & Boullet, 1917; Achlyodes thraso; Eantis thraso Godman & Salvin, [1895]; Achlyodes minor Comstock, 1944

= Eantis mithridates =

Sickle-winged skipper

Species of butterfly

Eantis mithridates, also known as the sickle-winged skipper or Jung's dusky wing, is a species of butterfly in the family Hesperiidae. It is found from Argentina, north through tropical America and the West Indies to southern Texas. A regular stray north to central Texas, rarely to Arkansas and Kansas.

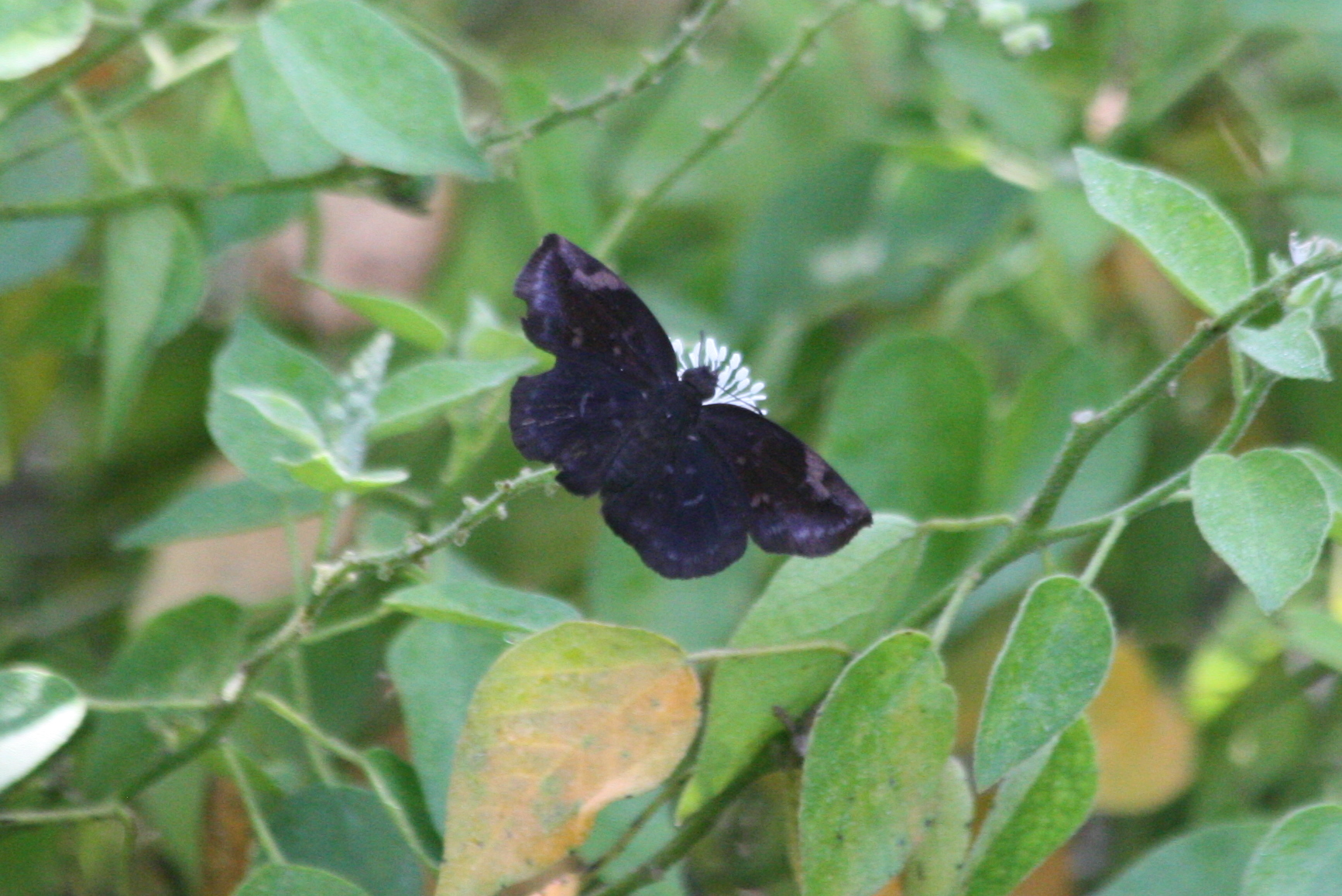

The wingspan is 35–45 mm. Adults are on wing all year round in most of its range.

The larvae feed on leaves of Rutaceae species, including Zanthoxylum fagara in Texas and Zanthoxylum monophyllum in tropical America. Adults feed on flower nectar.

== Subspecies ==
- Eantis mithridates mithridates - Jamaica
- Eantis mithridates papinianus - Trinidad, Cuba
- Eantis mithridates sagra - Haiti
