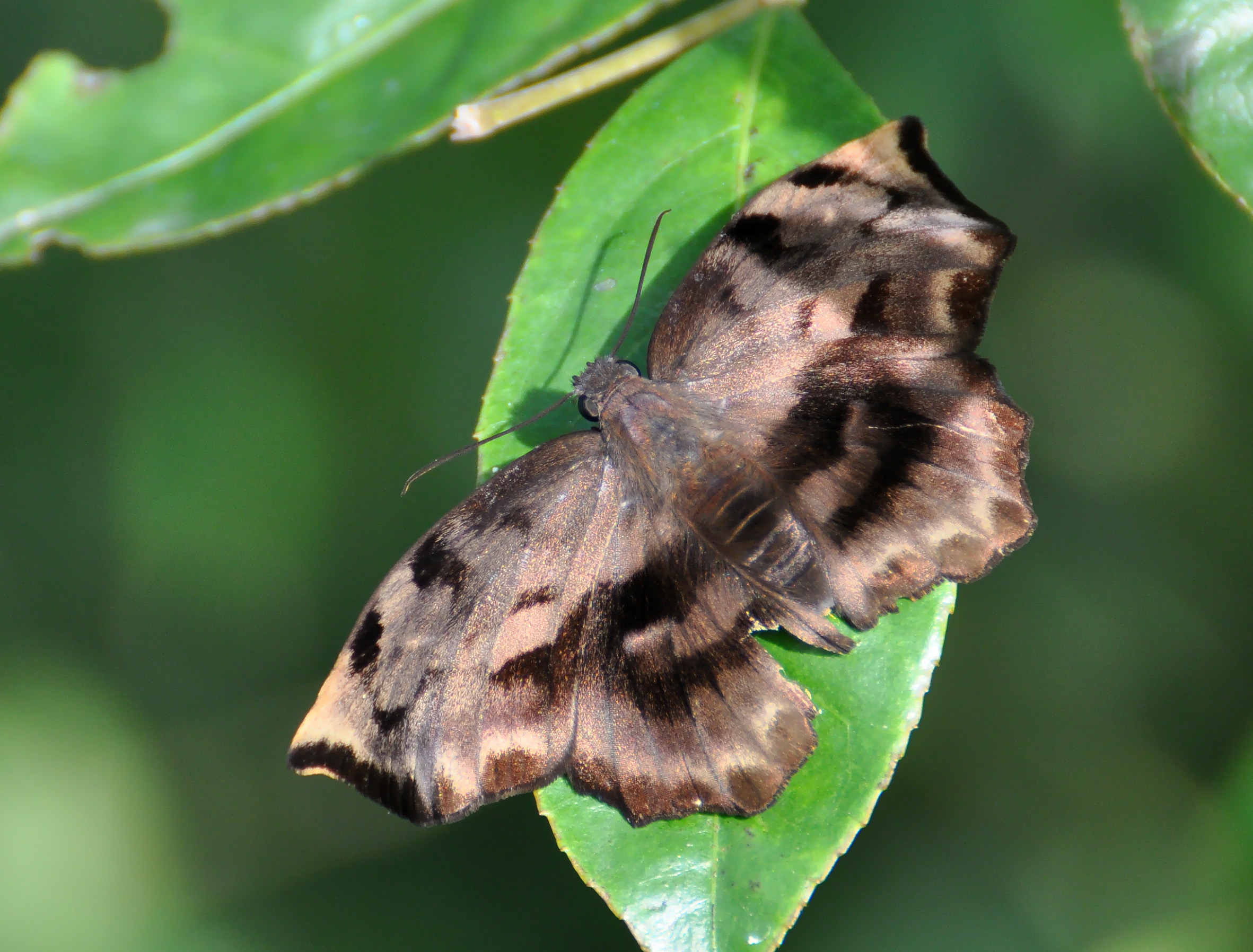
- In Brazil

Scientific classification
- Kingdom: Animalia
- Phylum: Arthropoda
- Class: Insecta
- Order: Lepidoptera
- Family: Hesperiidae
- Genus: Achlyodes; Hübner, [1819]
- Species: A. busirus

Binomial name
- Achlyodes busirus (Cramer, [1779])

Synonyms
- List (Genus): Sebaldia Mabille, 1903; (Species): Papilio busirus Cramer, [1779]; Eantis busirus Godman & Salvin, [1895]

= Achlyodes =

Achlyodes busirus

Genus of butterflies

Achlyodes is a genus of skippers. It is monotypic, being represented by the single species Achlyodes busirus.
