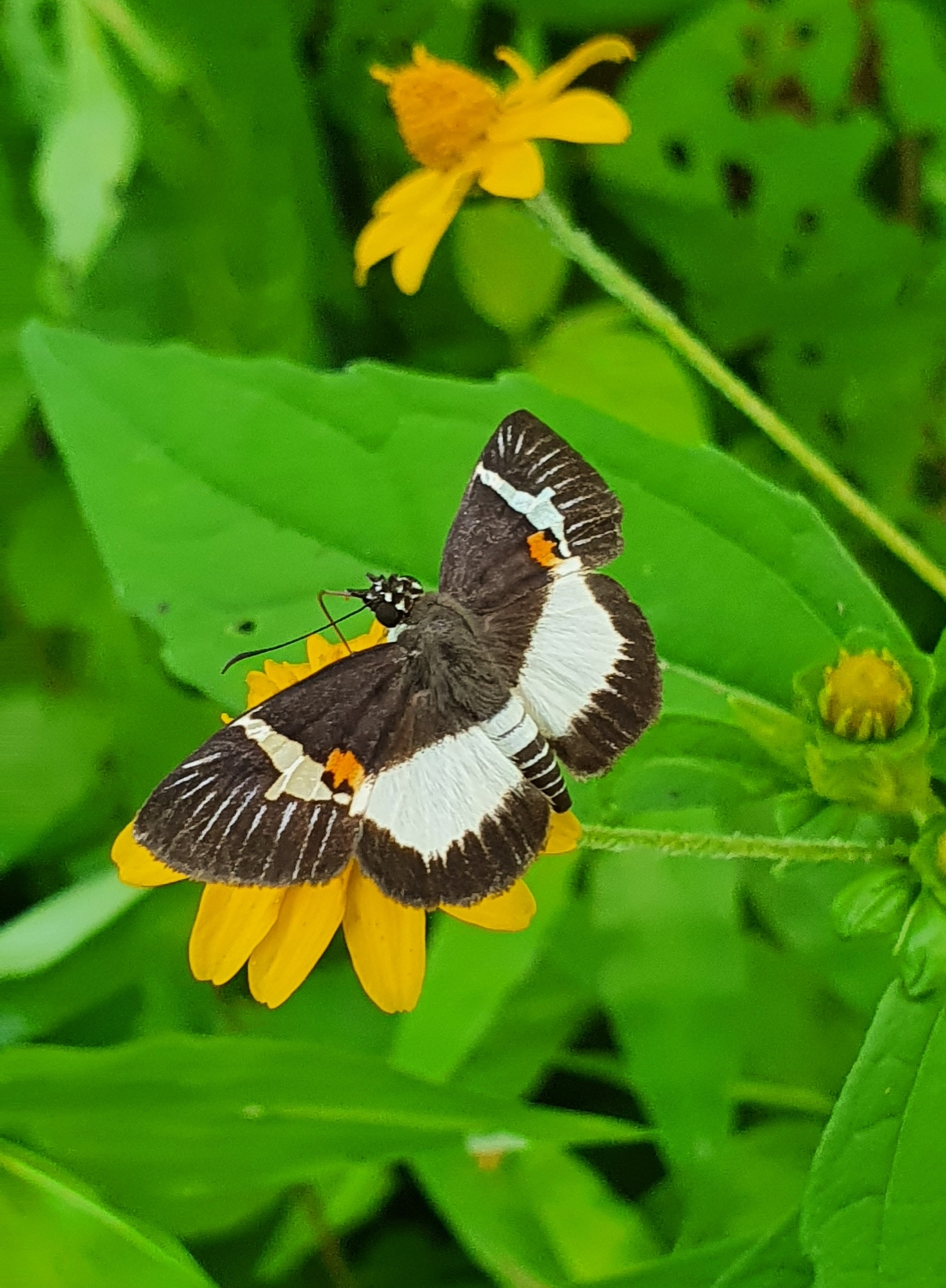

Scientific classification
- Kingdom: Animalia
- Phylum: Arthropoda
- Class: Insecta
- Order: Lepidoptera
- Family: Hesperiidae
- Genus: Atarnes; Godman & Salvin, [1897]
- Species: A. sallei

Binomial name
- Atarnes sallei (C. Felder & R. Felder, 1867)

Synonyms
- (Species): Leucochitonea salléi C. & R. Felder, 1867

= Atarnes =

Atarnes sallei

Genus of butterflies

Atarnes is a genus of skippers in the family Hesperiidae. It is monotypic, being represented by the single species Atarnes sallei.
