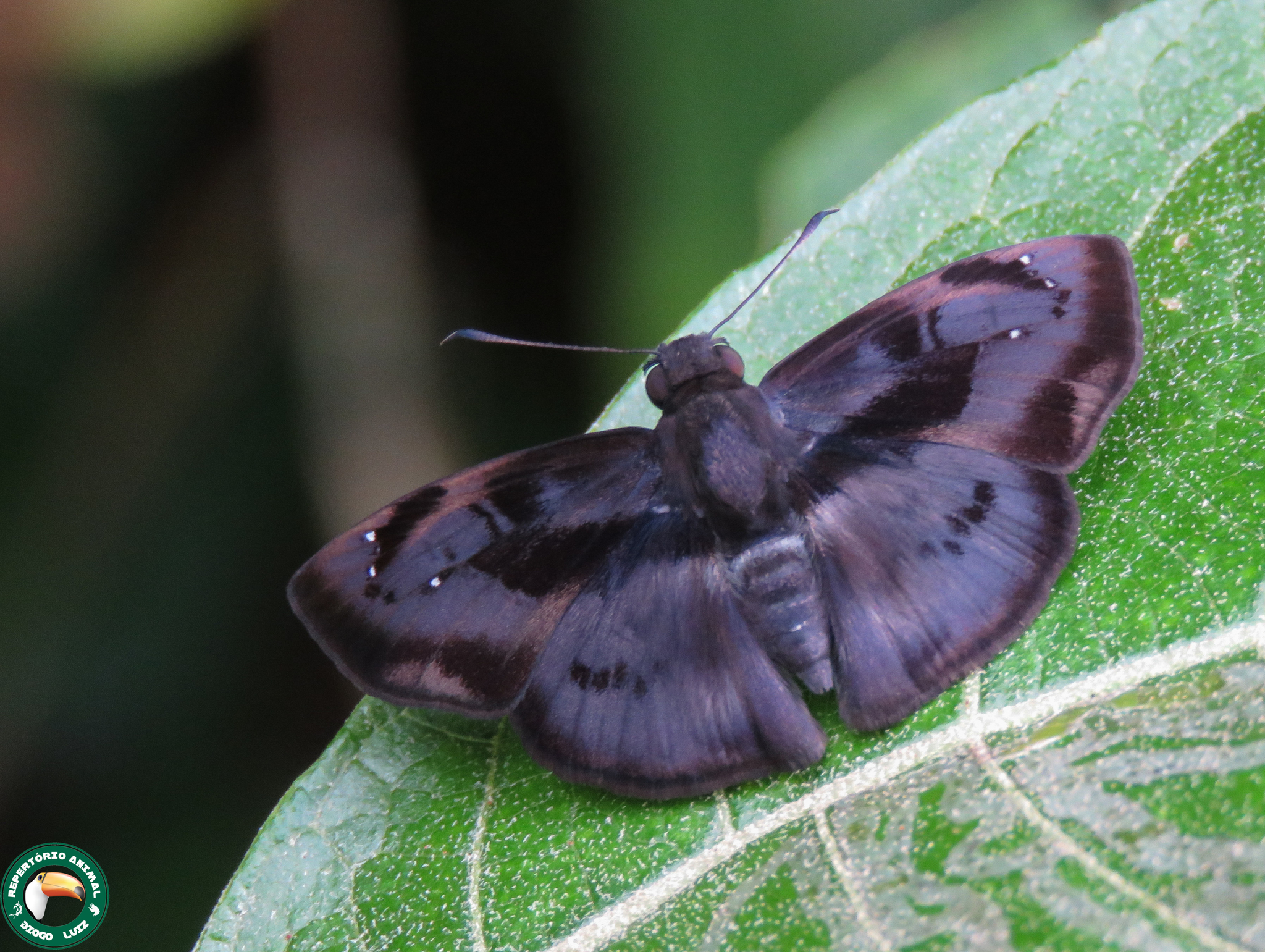
- Zera hyacinthinus

Scientific classification
- Kingdom: Animalia
- Phylum: Arthropoda
- Class: Insecta
- Order: Lepidoptera
- Family: Hesperiidae
- Subfamily: Pyrginae
- Genus: Zera; Evans, 1953

= Zera (butterfly) =

Genus of butterflies

Zera is a genus of skippers in the butterfly family Hesperiidae. There are about eight described species in Zera, found in Central and South America.

== Species ==
These eight species belong to the genus Zera:

- Zera belti (Godman & Salvin, 1894)
- Zera eboneus (Bell, 1947)
- Zera hosta
- Zera hyacinthinus (Mabille, 1877)
- Zera nolckeni (Mabille, 1891)
- Zera phila (Godman & Salvin, 1894)
- Zera tetrastigma (Sepp, 1848)
- Zera zera (Butler, 1870)
