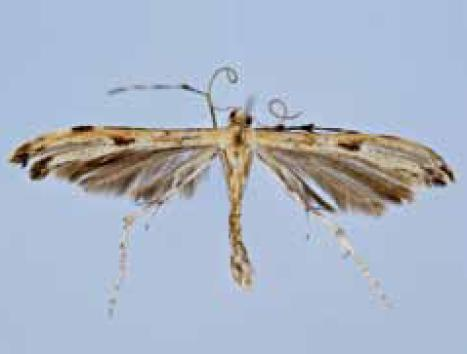

Scientific classification
- Kingdom: Animalia
- Phylum: Arthropoda
- Class: Insecta
- Order: Lepidoptera
- Family: Pterophoridae
- Genus: Hellinsia
- Species: H. surinamensis

Binomial name
- Hellinsia surinamensis (Sepp, 1855)

Synonyms
- Phalaena didactyla surinamensis Sepp, 1855; Oidaematophorus surinamensis; Oedaematophorus pelodactylus Berg, 1885; Oidaematophorus pelodactylus; Hellinsia pelodactyla; Pterophorus sacrificus Meyrick, 1926; Pterophorus surinamensis Sepp, 1855

= Hellinsia surinamensis =

Species of moth

Hellinsia surinamensis is a moth of the family Pterophoridae. It is found in Suriname, Argentina, Bolivia, Colombia, Ecuador, Paraguay and Uruguay.

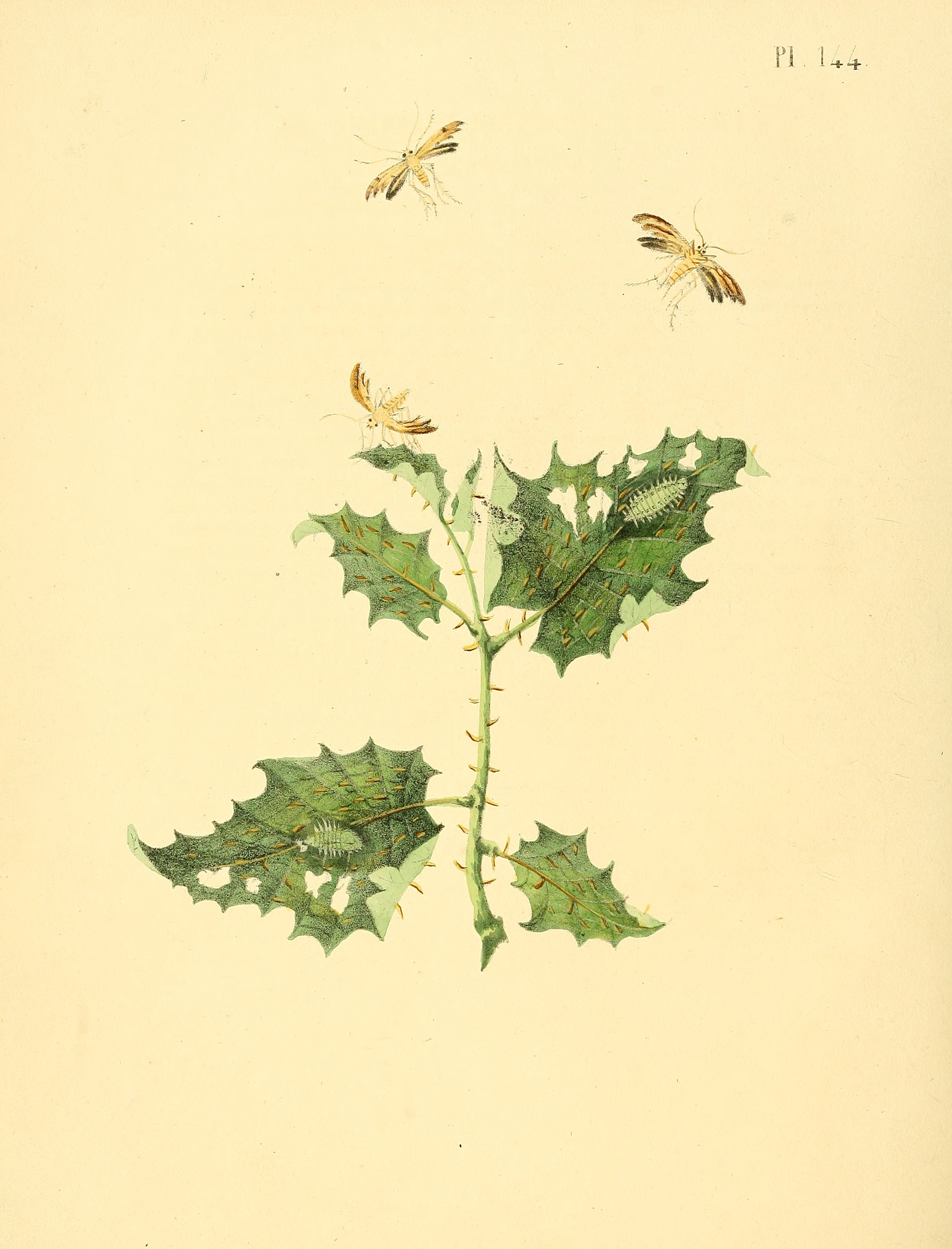
Illustration in Surinaamsche vlinders: naar het leven geteekend, plate 144

The wingspan is 21–24 mm (0.83–0.94 in). Adults are on wing in March and June.

The larvae feed on Solanum bonariensis, Solanum pseudocapsicum and Solanum verbascifolium.
