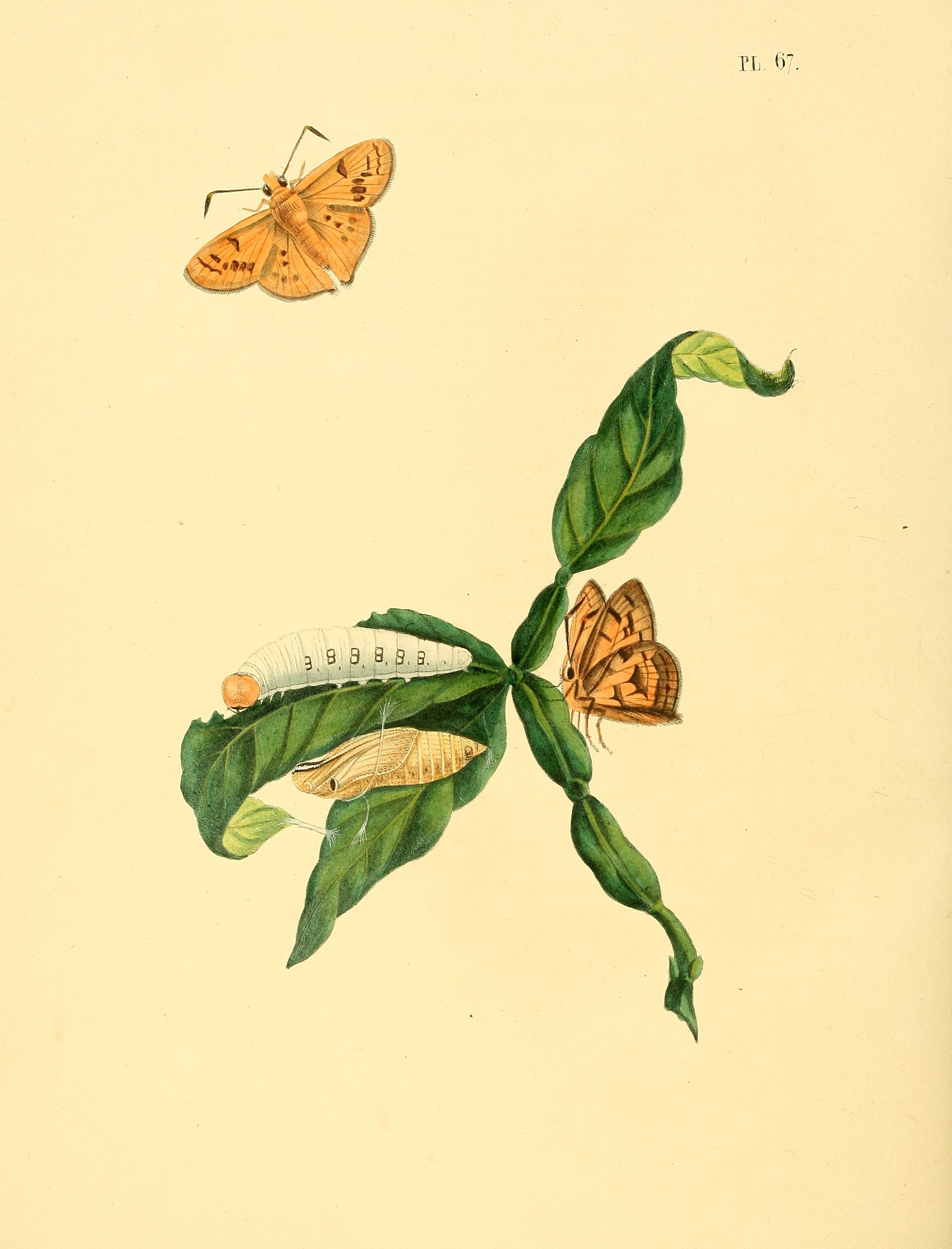
- Bungalotis quadratum (Sepp, [1845]); Pl 067

Scientific classification
- Kingdom: Animalia
- Phylum: Arthropoda
- Class: Insecta
- Order: Lepidoptera
- Family: Hesperiidae
- Genus: Bungalotis
- Species: B. quadratum

Binomial name
- Bungalotis quadratum (Sepp, [1845])

Synonyms
- Papilio quadratum Sepp, [1845]; Telegonus annulicornis Möschler, 1876

= Bungalotis quadratum =

Species of butterfly

Bungalotis quadratum (common name - pallid scarlet-eye) is a butterfly in the family Hesperiidae (subfamily - Eudaminae, tribe - Eudamini). It was first described by Jan Sepp in (approximately) 1845 as Papilio quadratum.

It is found in the Americas.
