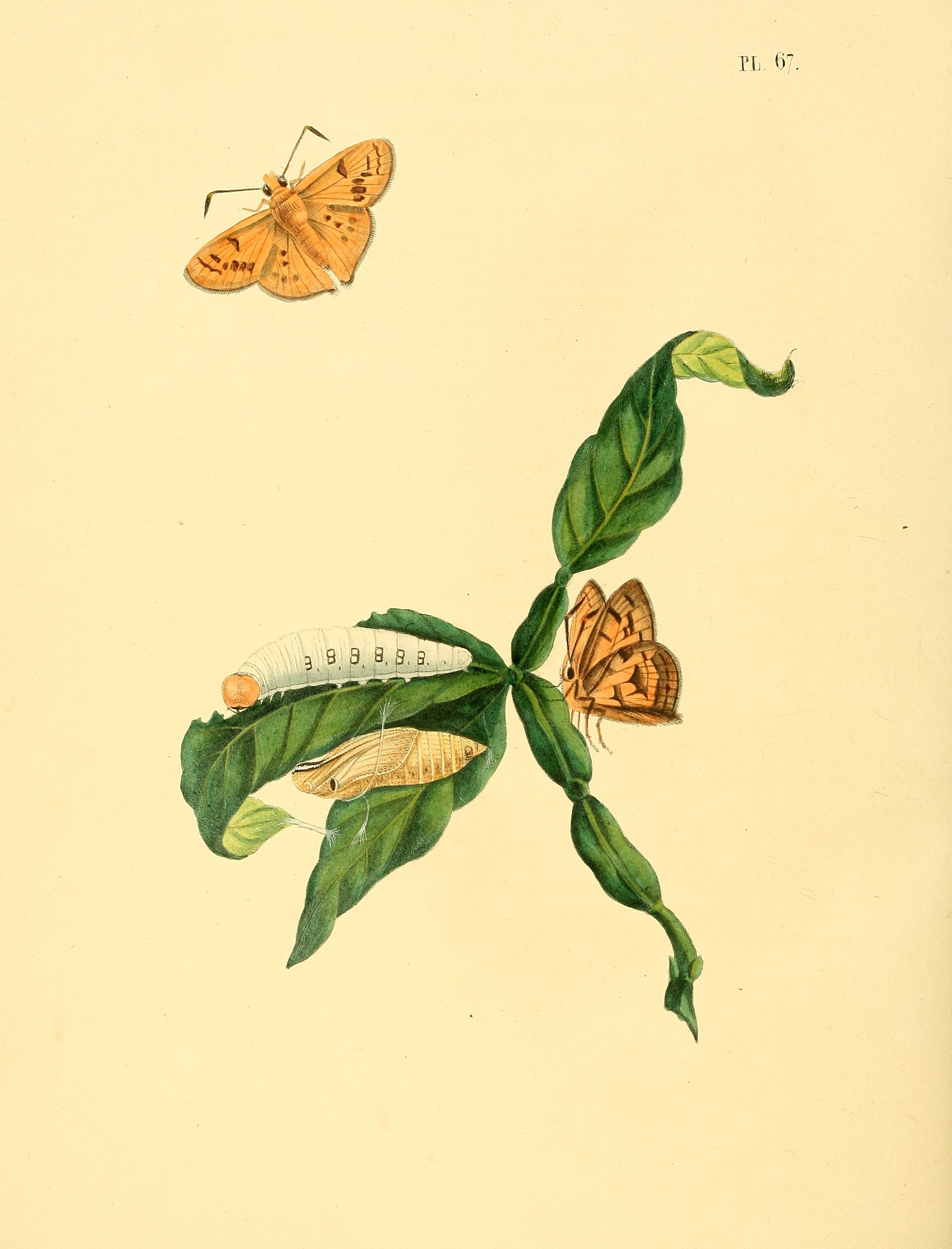
- Bungalotis quadratum (Sepp, [1845])

Scientific classification
- Kingdom: Animalia
- Phylum: Arthropoda
- Clade: Pancrustacea
- Class: Insecta
- Order: Lepidoptera
- Family: Hesperiidae
- Subfamily: Eudaminae
- Genus: Bungalotis; Watson, 1893

= Bungalotis =

Genus of butterflies

Bungalotis is a genus of Neotropical butterflies in the family Hesperiidae (Eudaminae), in which they are placed to genus Phocidini.

== Species ==
The following species and subspecies are recognised in the genus Bungalotis:

- Bungalotis erythus (Cramer, 1775)
- Bungalotis corentinus (Plötz, 1882)
- Bungalotis gagarini O. Mielke, 1967
- Bungalotis midas (Cramer, 1775)
- Bungalotis aureus Austin, 2008
- Bungalotis astylos (Cramer, 1780)
- Bungalotis milleri H. Freeman, 1977
- Bungalotis quadratum (Sepp, [1845])
  - Bungalotis quadratum quadratum (Sepp, [1845])
  - Bungalotis quadratum barba Evans, 1952
- Bungalotis sipa de Jong, 1983
- Bungalotis clusia Evans, 1952
- Bungalotis borax Evans, 1952
- Bungalotis lactos Evans, 1952
