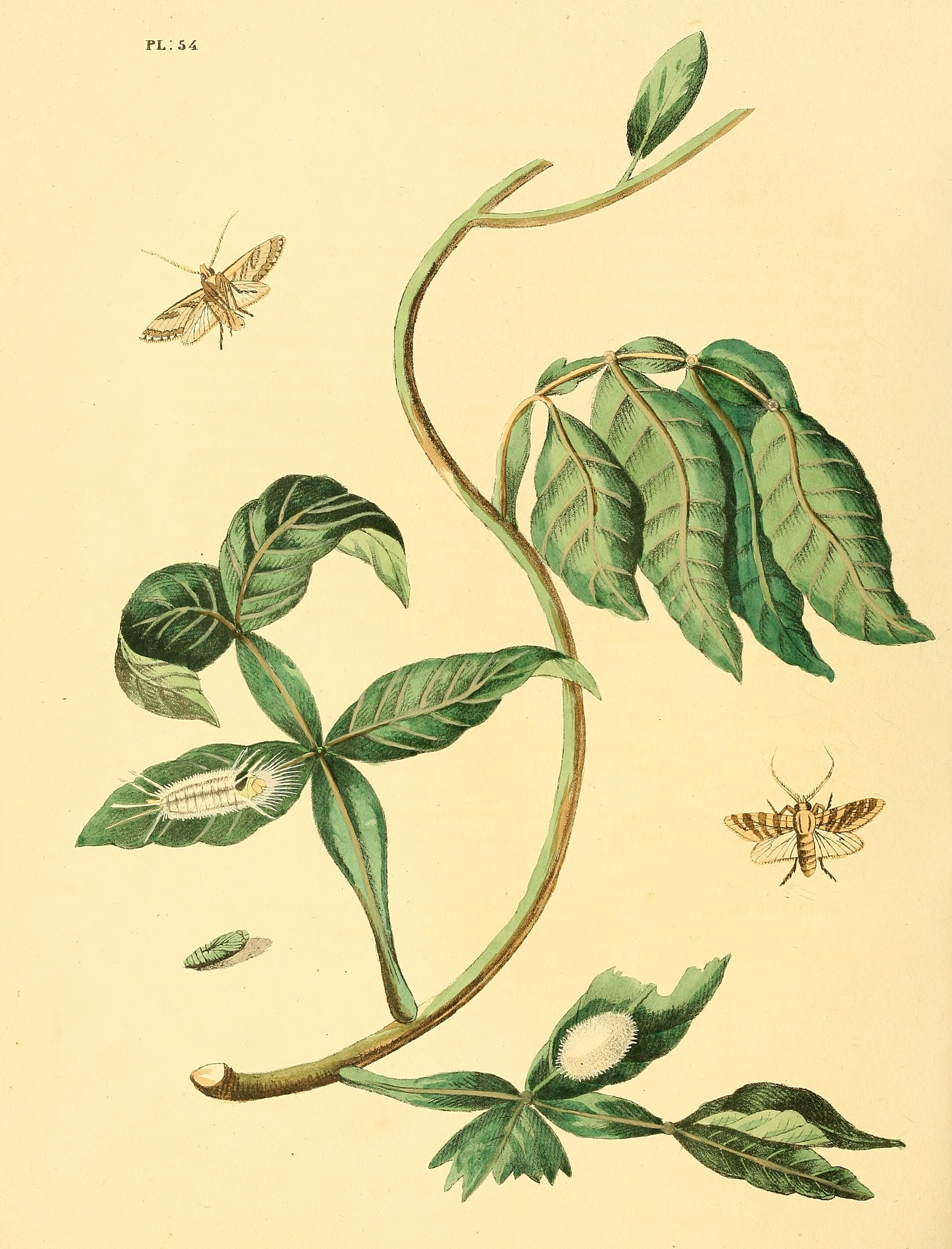

Scientific classification
- Domain: Eukaryota
- Kingdom: Animalia
- Phylum: Arthropoda
- Class: Insecta
- Order: Lepidoptera
- Superfamily: Noctuoidea
- Family: Erebidae
- Subfamily: Arctiinae
- Genus: Lophocampa
- Species: L. sesia

Binomial name
- Lophocampa sesia (Sepp, [1852])

Synonyms
- Phalaena sesia Sepp, [1852]; Halisidota walkeri major Rothschild, 1910

= Lophocampa sesia =

Species of moth

Lophocampa sesia is a moth of the family Erebidae. It was described by Jan Sepp in 1852. It is found in Suriname.
