= Jan Sepp =

Dutch entomologist and illustrator (1778-1853)

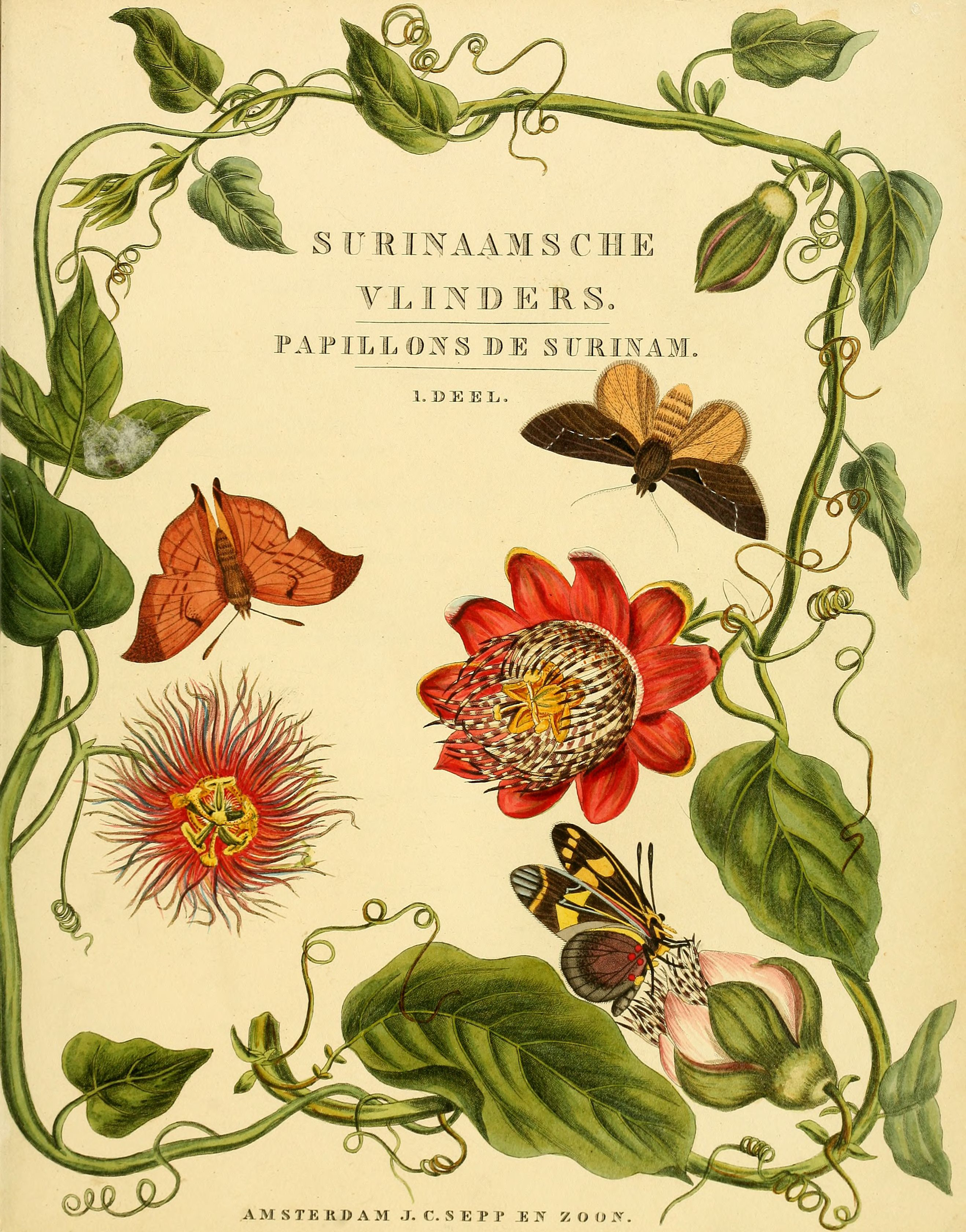
- frontispiece of Surinaamsche vlinders
- Born: 18 September 1778
- Died: 19 December 1853 (aged 75)
- Works: Flora Batava, Netherlands, Nederlandsche vogelen

Jan Sepp (1778–1853) was a Dutch entomologist.

He is noted for Surinaamsche vlinders: naar het leven geteekend (Papillons de Surinam dessinés d'après nature), a three volume work containing approximately 150 entomological illustrations of lepidoptera together with their verbal descriptions, for which he contributed the texts.

His zoological author abbreviation is Sepp. See also the list of taxa named by him.

== Other publications ==
- (1847) Natuurlijke historie van Surinaamsche vlinders : naar het leven geteekend / Histoire naturelle des papillons de Surinam
- (1850) Natuurlijke historie van schadelijke insekten
- (1800-) Flora Batava, afgebeeld door en van wegens J.C. Sepp en zoon with his father, Jan Christiaan Sepp.

== Gallery ==
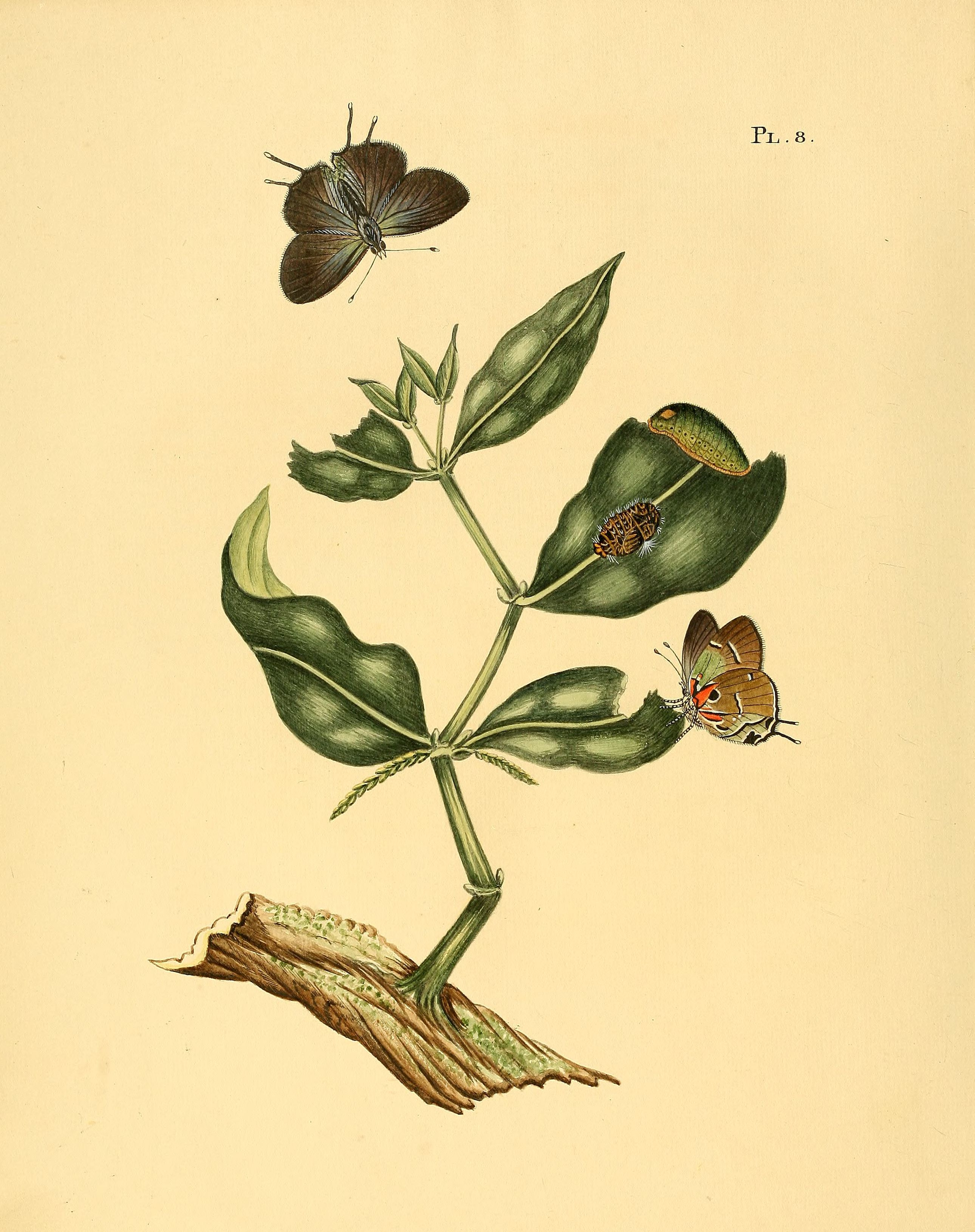
Pl.8 Papilio baeton

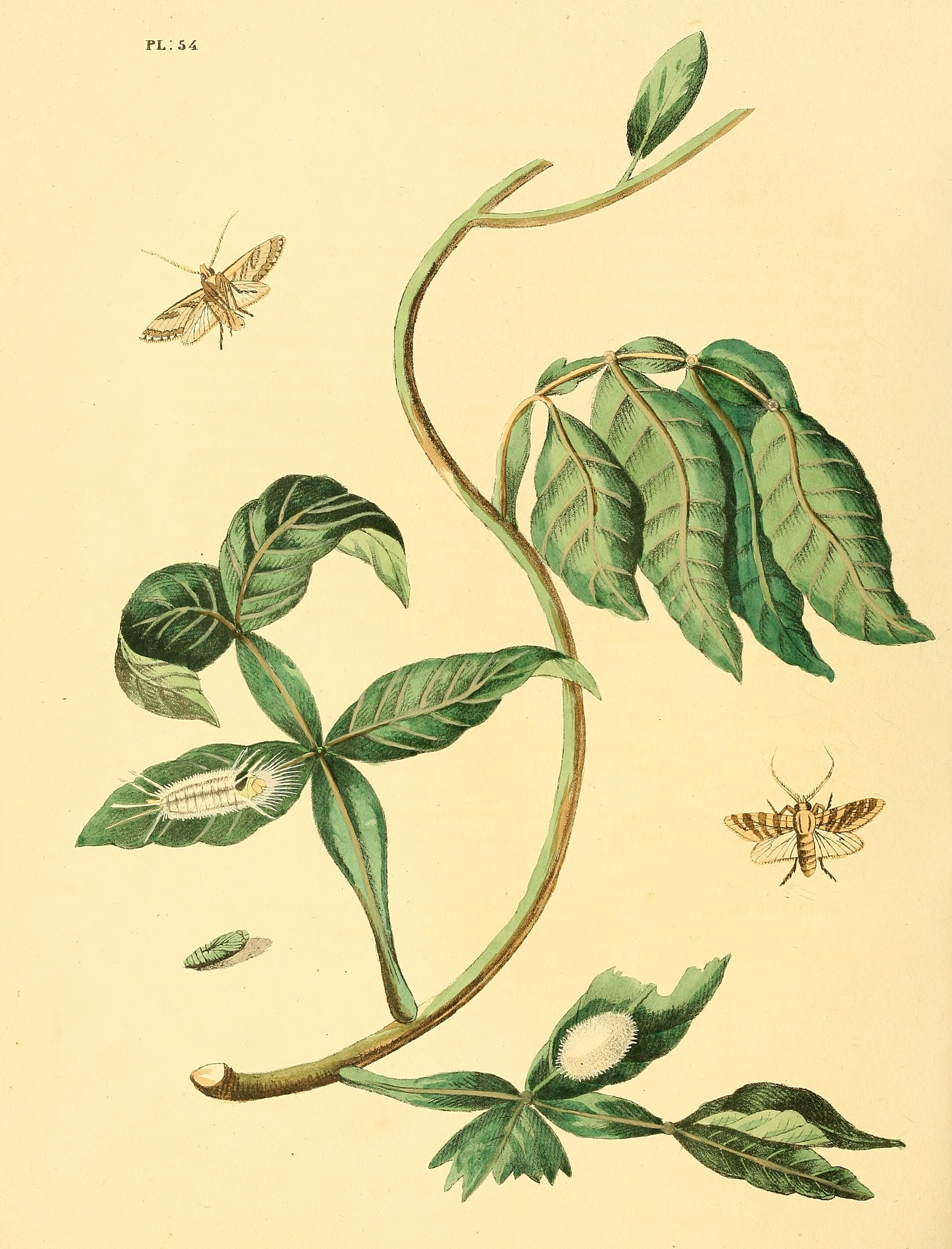
Pl.54 Phalaena sesia

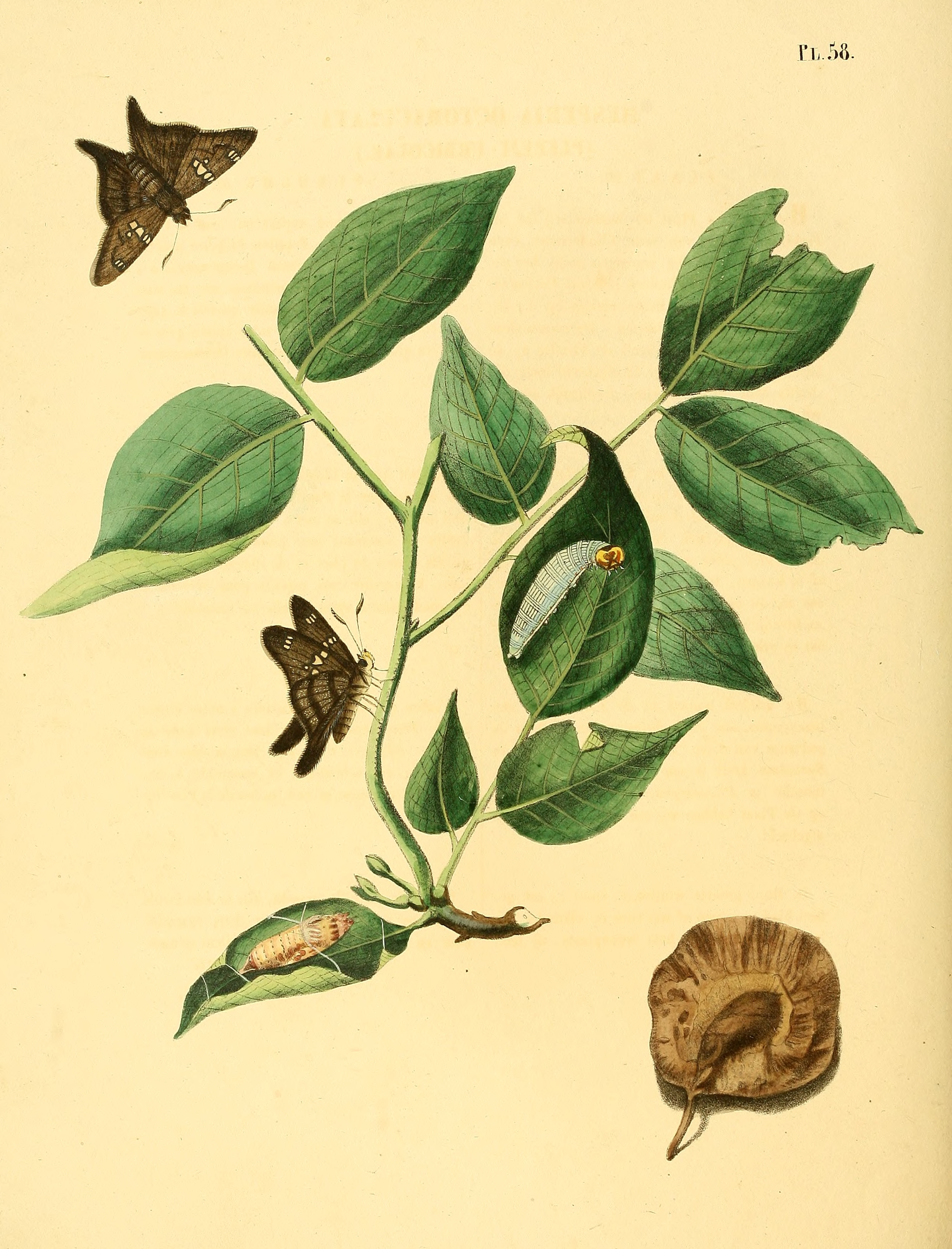
Pl.58 Hesperia octomaculata
