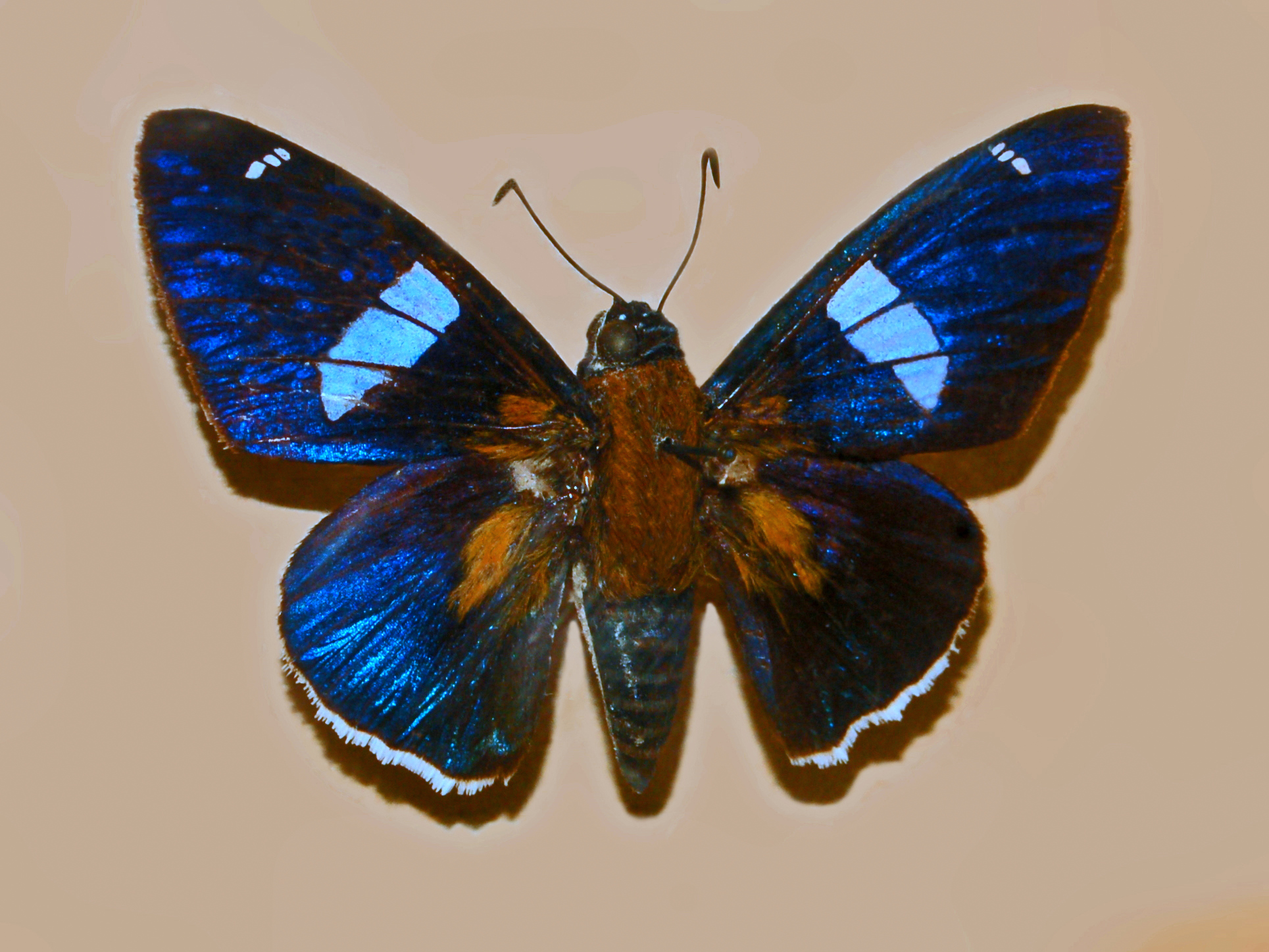
- Yanguna cometes staudingeri from Peru - mounted specimen

Scientific classification
- Kingdom: Animalia
- Phylum: Arthropoda
- Class: Insecta
- Order: Lepidoptera
- Family: Hesperiidae
- Genus: Yanguna
- Species: Y. cometes

Binomial name
- Yanguna cometes (Cramer, 1779)

Synonyms
- Papilio cometes Cramer, 1779

= Yanguna cometes =

Species of butterfly

Yanguna cometes is a species of skipper butterfly in the family Hesperiidae.

== Description ==
Yanguna cometes has a wingspan of about 30 millimetres (1.2 in). The uppersides of the wings are metallic blue, with a reddish basal area and broad white bands crossing the forewings. The undersides are similar to the uppersides. The body is hairy and reddish, while the abdomen is black crossed by white stripes.

== Distribution ==
This species occurs in Suriname, Peru and Bolivia.

== Subspecies ==
- Yanguna cometes cometes (Suriname)
- Yanguna cometes cometides Mabille & Boullet, 1908 (Bolivia)
- Yanguna cometes staudingeri (Plötz, 1879) (Peru, Bolivia)
