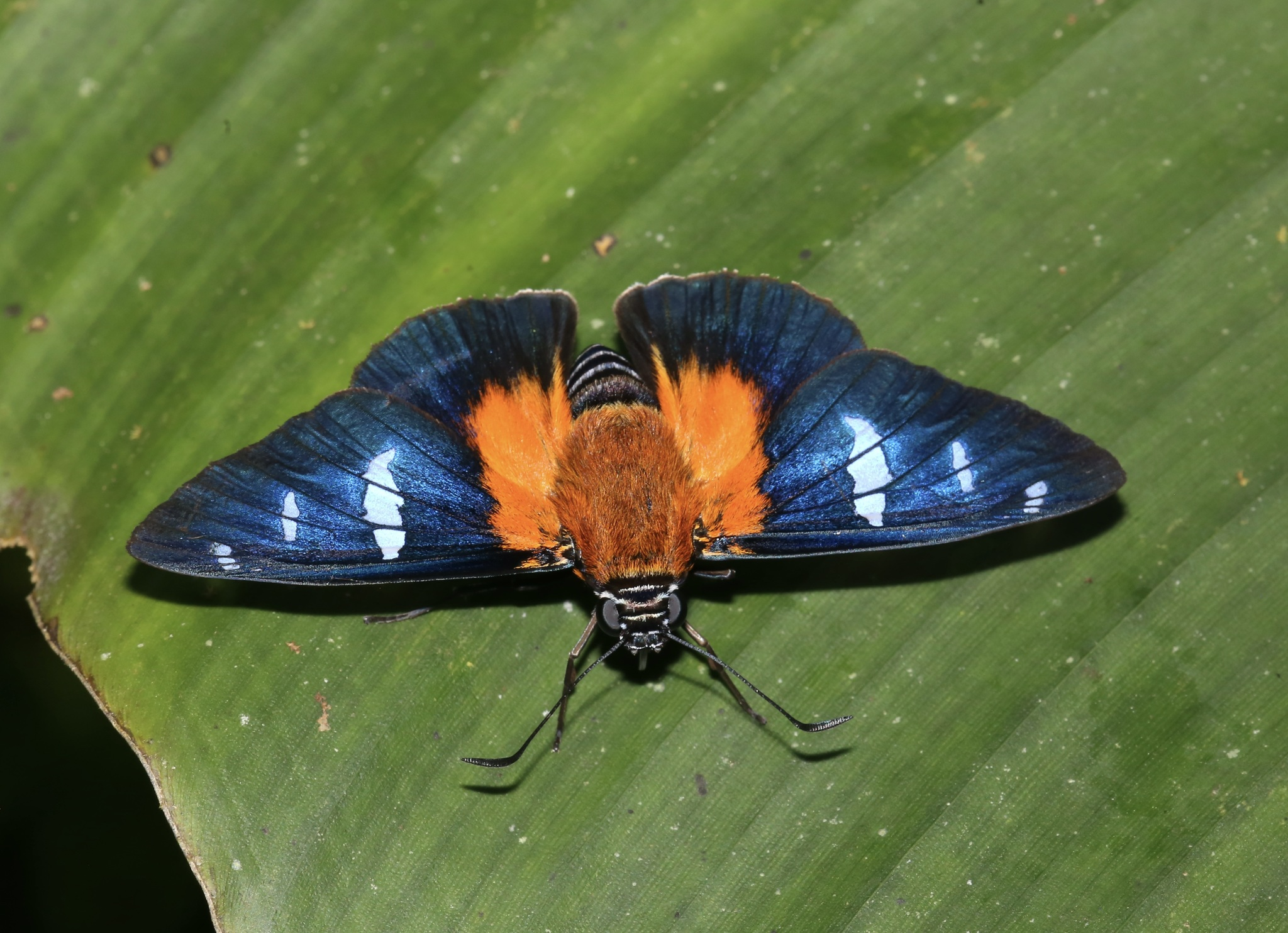
- Yanguna cosyra

Scientific classification
- Kingdom: Animalia
- Phylum: Arthropoda
- Class: Insecta
- Order: Lepidoptera
- Family: Hesperiidae
- Genus: Yanguna; Watson, 1893

= Yanguna =

Genus of butterflies

Yanguna is a Neotropical genus of firetips in the family Hesperiidae.

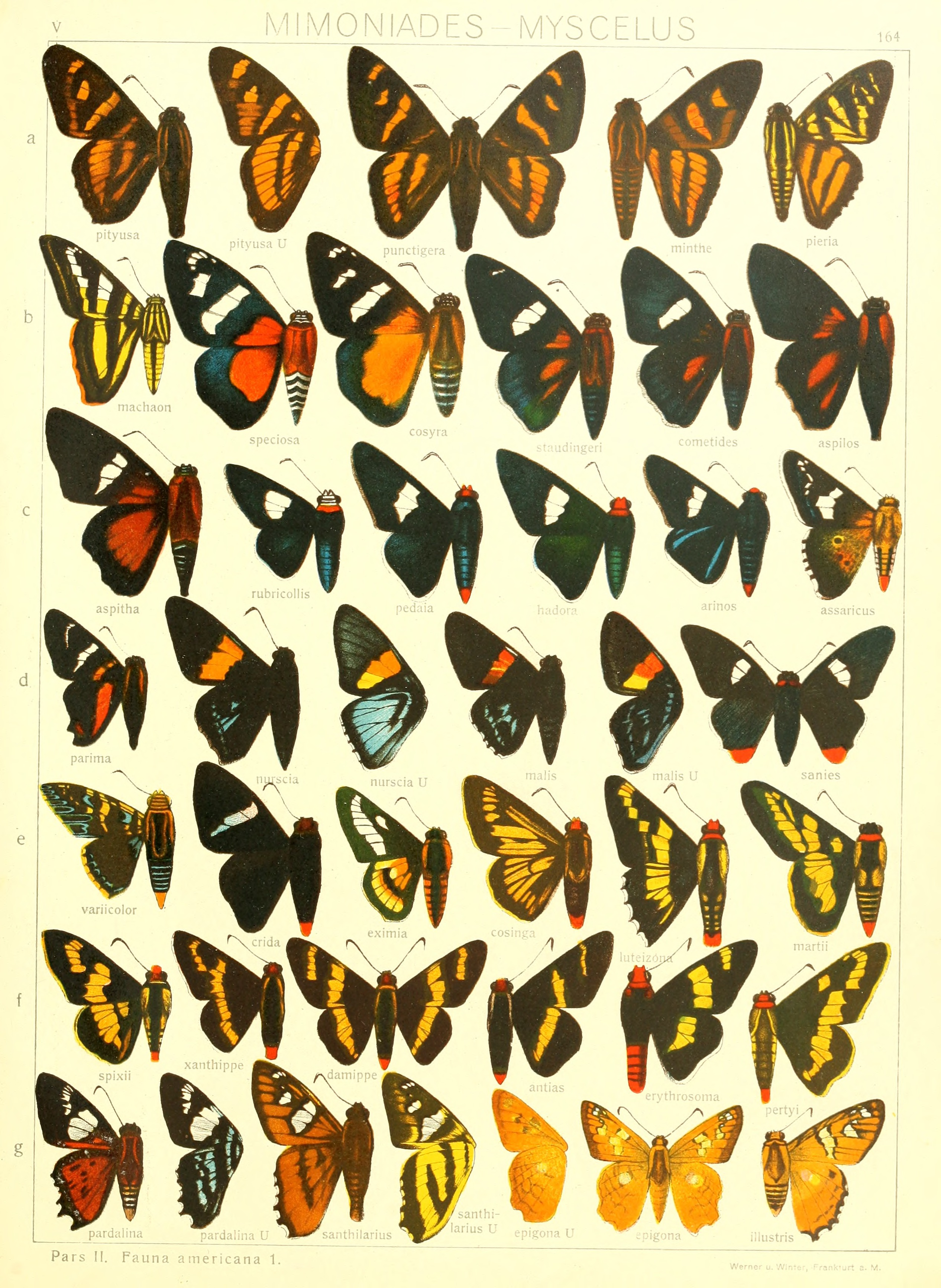
Yanguna and related genera in Adalbert Seitz's Macrolepidoptera of the World

== List of species ==
- Yanguna cometes (Cramer, 1779)
- Yanguna cosyra (Druce, 1875)
- Yanguna erebus (Plötz, 1879)
- Yanguna spatiosa Hewitson, 1870
- Yanguna tetricus Bell, 1931
- Yanguna thelersa (Hewitson, 1866)
