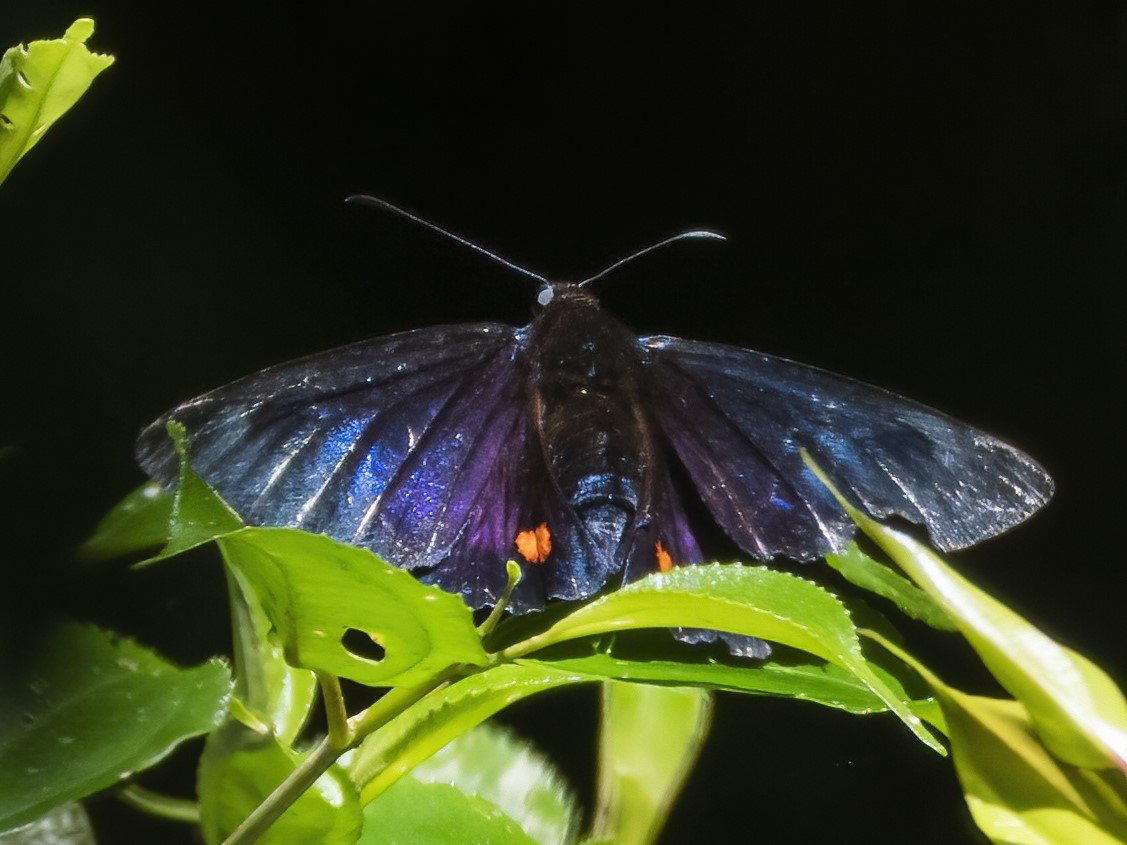

Scientific classification
- Kingdom: Animalia
- Phylum: Arthropoda
- Class: Insecta
- Order: Lepidoptera
- Family: Hesperiidae
- Genus: Creonpyge; Mielke, 2002
- Species: C. creon

Binomial name
- Creonpyge creon (Druce, 1874)

Synonyms
- Pyrrhopyga creon Druce, 1874

= Creonpyge =

Creonpyge creon

Genus of butterflies

Creonpyge is a Neotropical genus of firetips in the family Hesperiidae. The genus is monotypic containing the single species Creonpyge creon found in Costa Rica and Colombia.

== Subspecies ==
- C. c. creon (Druce, 1874)
- C. c. liliana (Nicolay & Small, 1969)
- C. c. taylori (Nicolay & Small, 1981)
