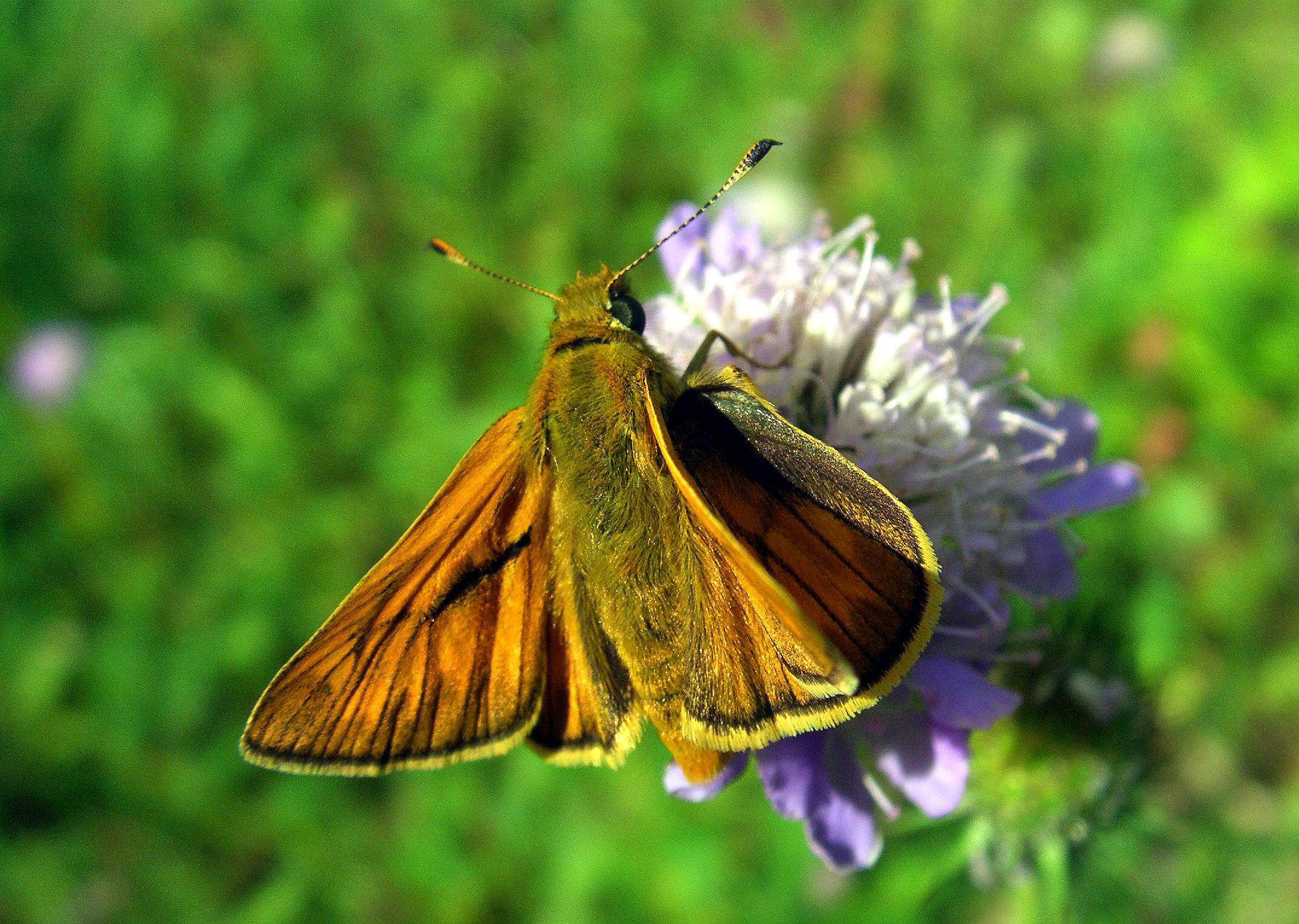
- Male large skipper (Ochlodes sylvanus)

Scientific classification
- Kingdom: Animalia
- Phylum: Arthropoda
- Class: Insecta
- Order: Lepidoptera
- Family: Hesperiidae
- Subfamily: Hesperiinae
- Tribe: Hesperiini; Latreille, 1809

Subtribes
- Anthoptina; Apaustina; Calpodina; Carystina; Falgina; Hesperiina; Moncina; Thymelicina

= Hesperiini =

Tribe of butterflies

The Hesperiini or branded grass skippers are a tribe in the Hesperiinae subfamily of skipper butterflies. They are known as branded grass skippers because all the males in this tribe feature a black diagonal brand of scales on their forewings that exude pheromones to attract females. Some subspecies of Hesperiini, such as Thespius Maacki, are found in high-altitude grasslands in areas like Araçatuba Mountain in Paraná, Brazil.

== Genera ==
- Adlerodea Hayward, 1940
- Alerema Hayward, 1942
- Alychna Grishin, 2019
- Amblyscirtes Scudder, 1872
- Anatrytone
- Apaustus Hübner, [1819]
- Arita Evans, 1955
- Aroma Evans, 1955
- Artines Godman, 1901
- Artonia Grishin, 2019
- Atalopedes
- Atrytone
- Atrytonopsis
- Barrolla
- Brownus
- Bruna Evans, 1955
- Buzella Grishin, 2019
- Buzyges
- Caligulana
- Callimormus Scudder, 1872
- Cantha Evans, 1955
- Carystus Hübner, 1819
- Chitta Grishin, 2019
- Chloeria Mabille, [1904]
- Choranthus
- Cobalus Hübner, 1819
- Cobalopsis Godman, 1900
- Conga
- Contrastia Grishin, 2022
- Coolus
- Corra Grishin, 2019
- Crinifemur Steinhauser, 2008
- Cumbre Evans, 1955
- Cyclosma
- Cymaenes Scudder, 1872
- Cynea
- Damas
- Daron
- Decinea
- Dion Godman, 1901
- Dubia
- Dubiella Evans, 1936
- Duroca Grishin, 2019
- Ebusus Evans, [1955]
- Eprius Godman, 1901
- Euphyes
- Eutocus Godman, 1901
- Eutus Grishin, 2022
- Eutychide Godman, 1900
- Evansiella Hayward, 1948
- Falga
- Fidius Grishin, 2019
- Flaccilla
- Gallio Evans, 1955
- Godmia Grishin, 2022
- Gracilata Grishin, 2022
- Gubrus Grishin, 2022
- Gufa Grishin, 2022
- Halotus Godman, 1900
- Haza
- Hermio Grishin, 2022
- Hesperia
- Holguinia
- Hylephila
- Igapophilus Mielke, 1980
- Inglorius Austin, 1997
- Joanna Evans, 1955
- Justinia
- Koria Grishin, 2022
- Lamponia Evans, 1955
- Lattus Grishin, 2022
- Lento Evans, 1955
- Lerema Scudder, 1872
- Lerodea Scudder, 1872
- Levina (Plötz, 1884)
- Libra
- Librita
- Limochores
- Lindra
- Linka
- Lon Grishin, 2019
- Lucida Evans, 1955
- Ludens Evans, 1955
- Lurida Grishin, 2019
- Megaleas Godman, 1901
- Metrocles
- Methion
- Methionopsis
- Metron
- Mielkeus
- Mit Grishin, 2022
- Mnasicles Godman, 1901
- Mnasides Godman, 1901
- Mnasitheus Godman, 1900
- Mnestheus Godman, 1901
- Moeris Godman, 1900
- Molla Evans, 1955
- Molo
- Monca Evans, 1955
- Mucia Godman, 1900
- Naevolus Hemming, 1939
- Neoxeniades Hayward, 1938
- Nastra Evans, 1955
- Niconiades Hübner, 1821
- Notamblyscirtes
- Noxys
- Nyctelius
- Ochlodes
- Oeonus
- Oligoria
- Onespa
- Onophas Godman, 1900
- Orthos Evans, 1955
- Oxynthes
- Panca Evans, 1955
- Papias Godman, 1900
- Paracarystus Godman, 1900
- Parachoranthus
- Paratrytone
- Pares Bell, 1959
- Parphorus Godman, 1900
- Peba Mielke, 1968
- Phanes Godman, 1901
- Phemiades
- Pheraeus Godman, 1900
- Phlebodes Hübner, 1819
- Picova Grishin, 2022
- Poanes
- Polites
- Pompeius
- Problema
- Propapias
- Pseudocopaeodes
- Psoralis Mabille, 1904
- Punta Evans, 1955
- Pyrrhocalles
- Quasimellana
- Racta
- Radiatus Mielke, 1968
- Ralis Grishin, 2019
- Rectava Grishin, 2022
- Rhinthon Godman, 1900
- Rhomba Grishin, 2022
- Rigga
- Saturnus Evans, 1955
- Serdis
- Sodalia Evans, 1955
- Stinga
- Synapte
- Sucova (Schaus, 1902)
- Talides Hübner, [1819]
- Tava
- Telles Godman, 1900
- Tellona Evans, 1955
- Testia Grishin, 2019
- Thargella Godman, 1900
- Thespieus
- Thoon Godman, 1900
- Thracides Hübner, 1819
- Tigasis Godman, 1901
- Tirynthia
- Tirynthoides
- Tricrista Grishin, 2019
- Tromba Evans, 1955
- Tisias Godman, 1901
- Turesis
- Turmosa
- Vacerra
- Veadda Grishin, 2019
- Vehilius Godman, 1900
- Venas Evans, 1955
- Vernia Grishin, 2019
- Vertica Evans, 1955
- Vettius Godman, 1901
- Vidius Evans, 1955
- Vinius Godman, 1900
- Vinpeius Austin, 1997
- Virga Evans, 1955
- Viridina Grishin, 2019
- Vistigma Hayward, 1939
- Wallengrenia
- Xeniades
- Zalomes Bell, 1947
- Zariaspes Godman, 1900
- Zetka
