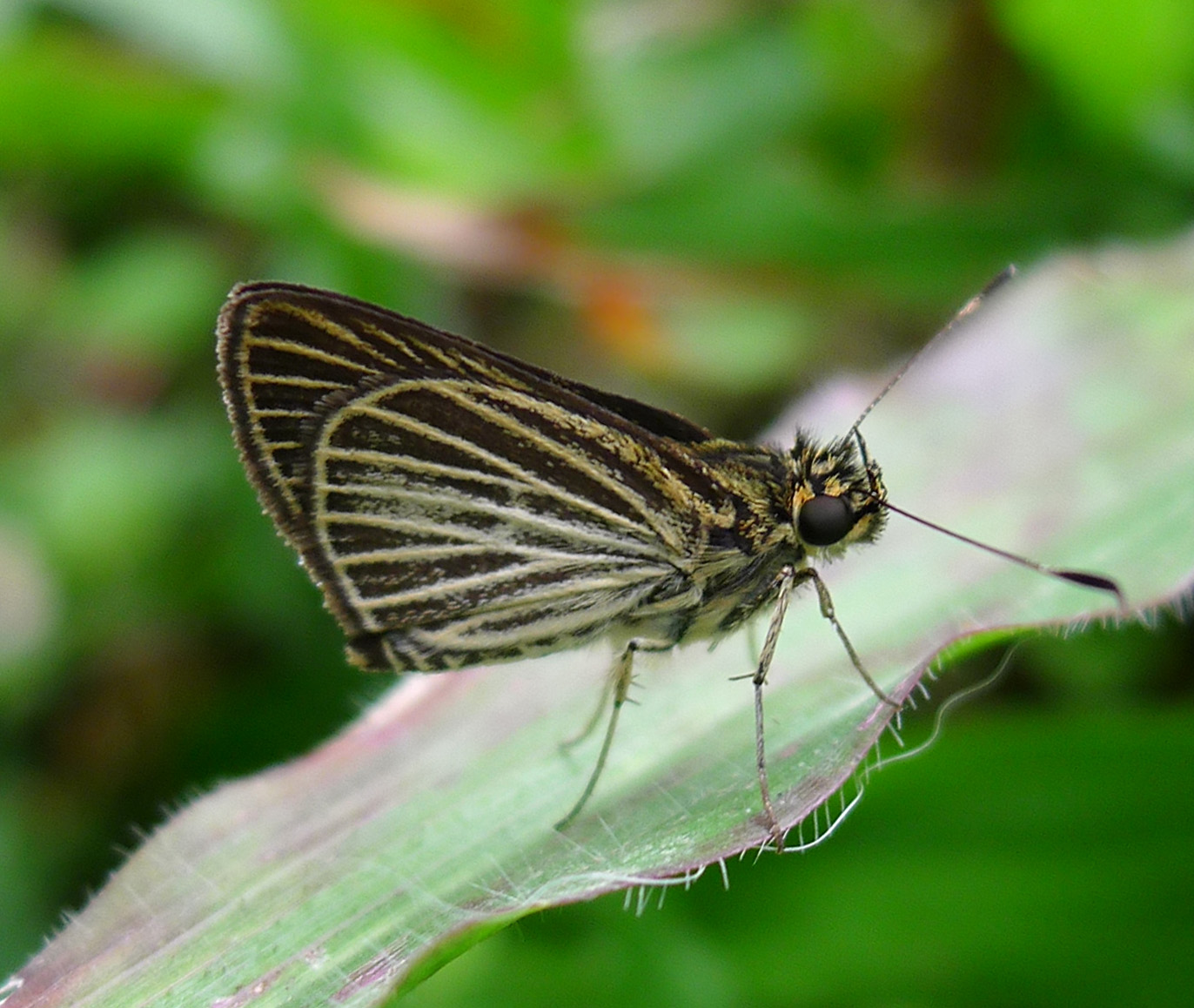
- Apaustus gracilis

Scientific classification
- Kingdom: Animalia
- Phylum: Arthropoda
- Clade: Pancrustacea
- Class: Insecta
- Order: Lepidoptera
- Family: Hesperiidae
- Subtribe: Apaustina
- Genus: Apaustus; Hübner, [1819]

= Apaustus =

Genus of butterflies

Apaustus is a genus of skippers in the family Hesperiidae.

== Species ==
Recognised species in the genus Apaustus include:

- Apaustus menes (Stoll, 1782)

=== Former species ===
- Apaustus anomoeus Plötz, 1879 - transferred to Astictopterus anomoeus (Plötz, 1879)
- Apaustus argyrosticta Plötz, 1879 - transferred to Argemma argyrosticta (Plötz, 1879)
- Apaustus debilis Plötz, 1879 - transferred to Prosopalpus debilis (Plötz, 1879)
- Apaustus facilis Plötz, 1884 - transferred to Eutocus facilis (Plötz, 1884)
- Apaustus ira Butler, 1870 - transferred to Rigga ira (Butler, 1870)
- Apaustus valerius Möschler, 1879 - transferred to Cobalopsis valerius (Möschler, 1879)
- Apaustus vicinus Plötz, 1884 - transferred to Lento vicinus (Plötz, 1884)
