= Lindra =

Lindra may refer to:

- Lindra (skipper), a genus of skippers in the family Hesperiidae
- Lindra (fungus), a genus of fungi in the family Lulworthiaceae
