= Cobalus =

Scientific classification
- Kingdom: Animalia
- Phylum: Arthropoda
- Class: Insecta
- Order: Lepidoptera
- Family: Hesperiidae
- Subtribe: Calpodina
- Genus: Cobalus; Hübner, 1819

Genus of butterflies

Cobalus is a genus of skippers in the family Hesperiidae.

== Species ==
Recognised species in the genus Cobalus include:

- Cobalus fidicula (Hewitson, 1877)
- Cobalus virbius Cramer, 1777

=== Former species ===
- Cobalus aethus Hayward, 1951 - transferred to Tricrista aethus (Hayward, 1951)
- Cobalus arita Schaus, 1902 - transferred to Tigasis arita (Schaus, 1902)
- Cobalus asella Herrich-Schäffer, 1869 - synonymized with Amblyscirtes alternata (Grote and Robinson, 1867)
- Cobalus calvina (Hewitson, 1866) - transferred to Calvetta calvina (Hewitson, 1866)
- Cobalus cannae Herrich-Schäffer, 1869 - transferred to Quinta cannae (Herrich-Schäffer, 1869)
- Cobalus chrysophrys Mabille, 1891 - transferred to Mnasitheus chrysophrys (Mabille, 1891)
- Cobalus cinnamomea Herrich-Schäffer, 1869 - transferred to Methionopsis cinnamomea (Herrich-Schäffer, 1869)
- Cobalus columbaria Herrich-Schäffer, 1870 - transferred to Onophas columbaria (Herrich-Schäffer, 1870)
- Cobalus corope Herrich-Schäffer, 1869 - transferred to Tigasis corope (Herrich-Schäffer, 1869)
- Cobalus cristatus Bell, 1930 - transferred to Tricrista cristatus (Bell, 1930)
- Cobalus discors Plötz, 1882 - transferred to Carystina discors (Plötz, 1882)
- Cobalus disjuncta Herrich-Schäffer, 1869 - synonymized with Dubiella dubius (Stoll, 1781)
- Cobalus duplex Mabille, 1889 - synonymized with Prosopalpus debilis (Plötz, 1879)
- Cobalus evanidus Mabille, 1883 - synonymized with Mnasilus allubita (Butler, 1877)
- Cobalus gabina Godman, 1900 - transferred to Neoxeniades gabina (Godman, 1900)
- Cobalus hypargyra Herrich-Schäffer, 1869 - transferred to Paracarystus hypargyra (Herrich-Schäffer, 1869)
- Cobalus illudens Mabille, 1891 - synonymized with Vehilius stictomenes (Butler, 1877)
- Cobalus ludens Mabille, 1891 - transferred to Ludens ludens (Mabille, 1891)
- Cobalus lumina Herrich-Schäffer, 1869 - transferred to Cymaenes lumina (Herrich-Schäffer, 1869)
- Cobalus lurida Herrich-Schäffer, 1869 - transferred to Lurida lurida (Herrich-Schäffer, 1869)
- Cobalus mubevensis Bell, 1932 - transferred to Eutus mubevensis (Bell, 1932)
- Cobalus quadrata Herrich-Schäffer, 1869 - transferred to Xeniades quadrata (Herrich-Schäffer, 1869)
- Cobalus rastaca Schaus, 1902 - transferred to Eutus rastaca (Schaus, 1902)
- Cobalus simplicissima Herrich-Schäffer, 1870 - transferred to Mnasalcas simplicissima (Herrich-Schäffer, 1870)
- Cobalus stigmula Mabille, 1891 - synonymized with Contrastia distigma (Plötz, 1882)
- Cobalus tertianus Herrich-Schäffer, 1869 - transferred to Mielkeus tertianus (Herrich-Schäffer, 1869)
- Cobalus tripunctus Herrich-Schäffer, 1865 - transferred to Cymaenes tripunctus (Herrich-Schäffer, 1865)
- Cobalus umbrosus Mabille, 1883 - synonymized with Mnasilus allubita (Butler, 1877)
