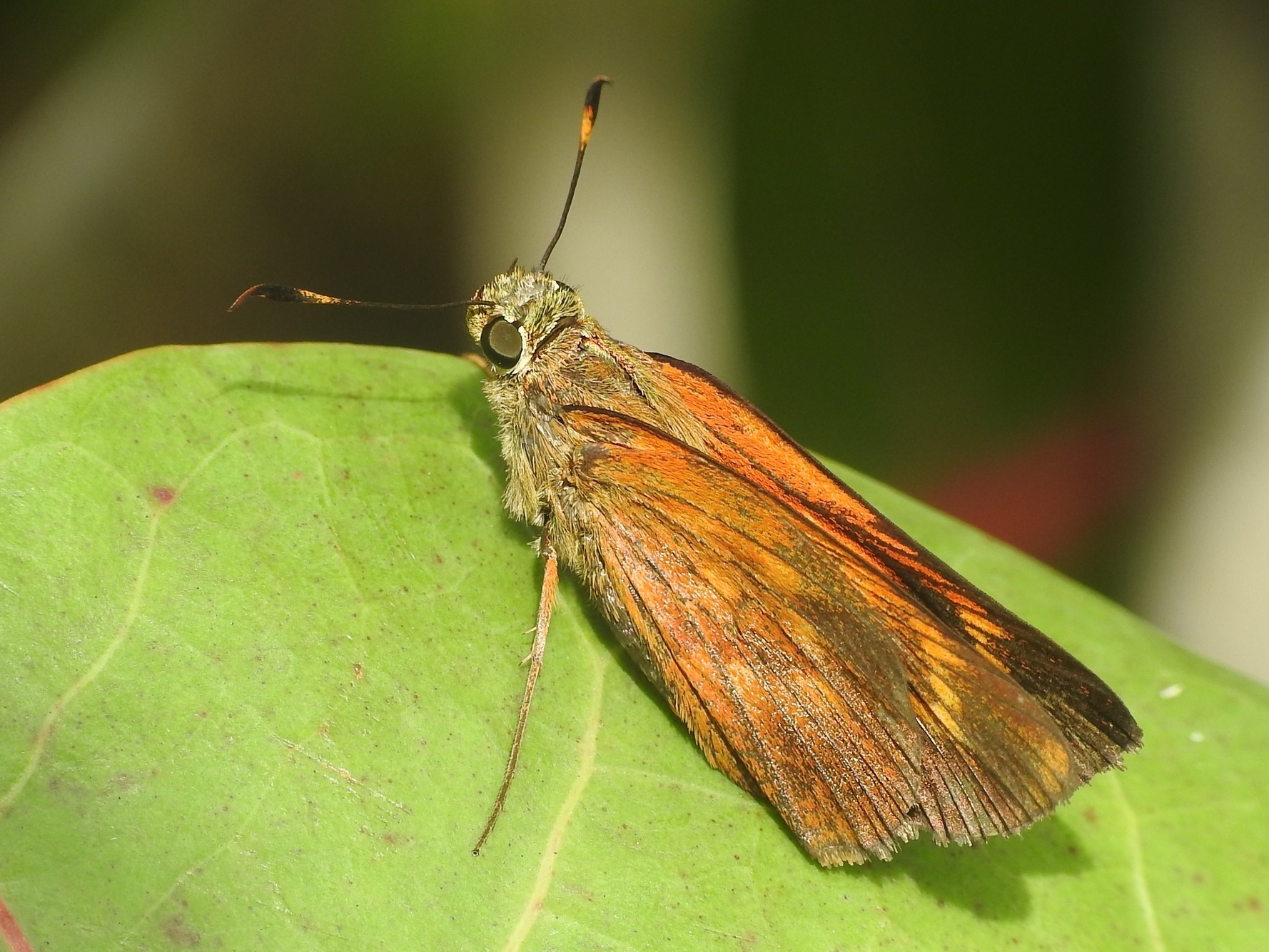
- In Santo Domingo, Dominican Republic

Scientific classification
- Domain: Eukaryota
- Kingdom: Animalia
- Phylum: Arthropoda
- Class: Insecta
- Order: Lepidoptera
- Family: Hesperiidae
- Genus: Choranthus
- Species: C. antiqua

Binomial name
- Choranthus antiqua Herrich-Schäffer, 1863

Synonyms
- Pyrrhocalles antiqua (Herrich-Schäffer, 1863)

= Choranthus antiqua =

Caribbean skipper

Species of butterfly native to the island of Hispaniola

Choranthus antiqua, the Caribbean skipper, is a species of skipper in the family Hesperiidae. It can be found on the island of Hispaniola in the countries of Dominican Republic and Haiti.

== Taxonomy ==
Originally conspecific with the Cuban skipper, Choranthus orientis, in a now inactive taxon, Pyrrhocalles antiqua, the species was split and the genus was renamed in 2022.
