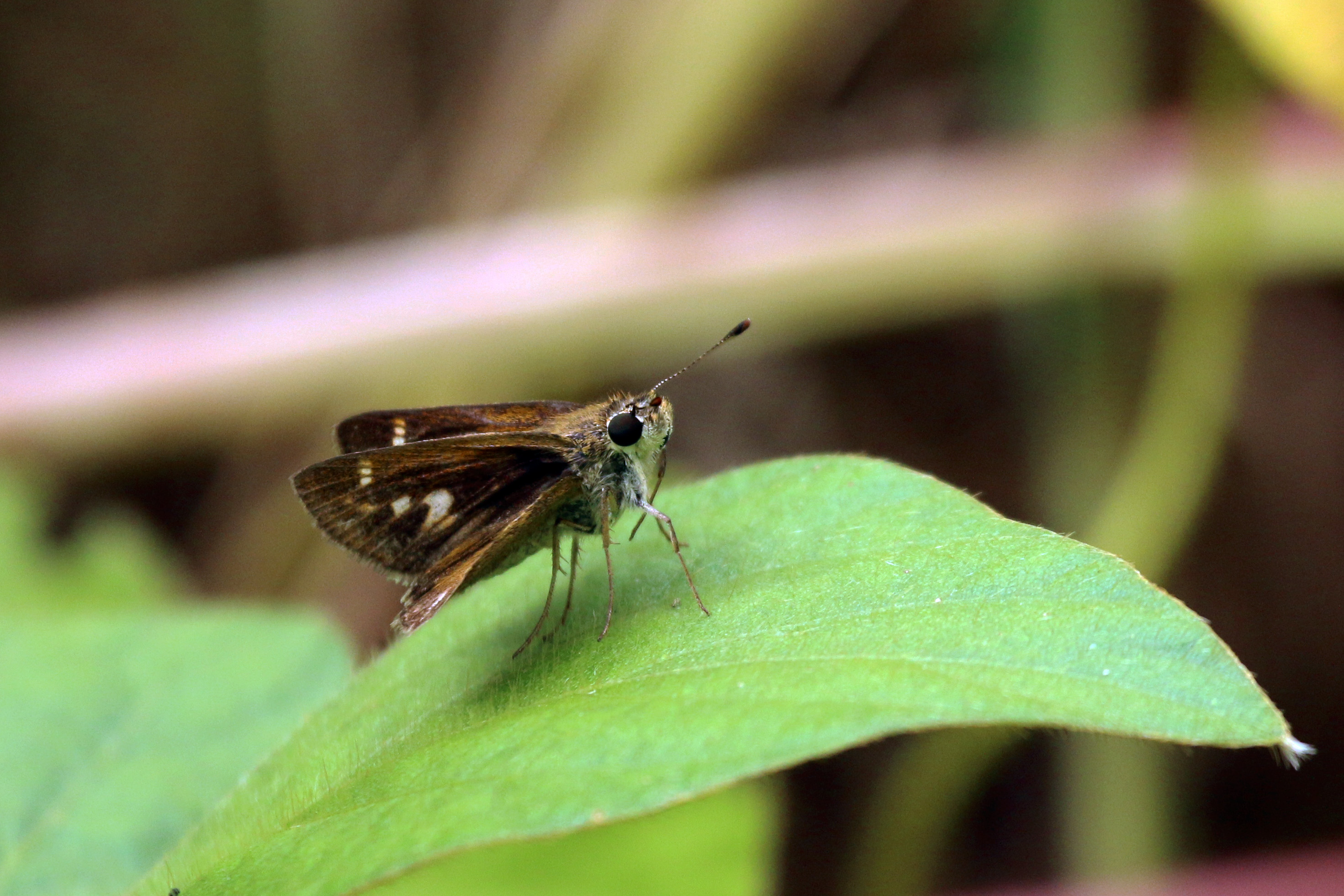

Scientific classification
- Kingdom: Animalia
- Phylum: Arthropoda
- Clade: Pancrustacea
- Class: Insecta
- Order: Lepidoptera
- Family: Hesperiidae
- Genus: Nyctelius
- Species: N. nyctelius

Binomial name
- Nyctelius nyctelius (Latreille, 1824)

= Nyctelius nyctelius =

Species of butterfly

Nyctelius nyctelius, known generally as the violet-banded skipper or nyctelius skipper, is a species of grass skipper in the butterfly family Hesperiidae. It is found in Central America, North America, and South America.

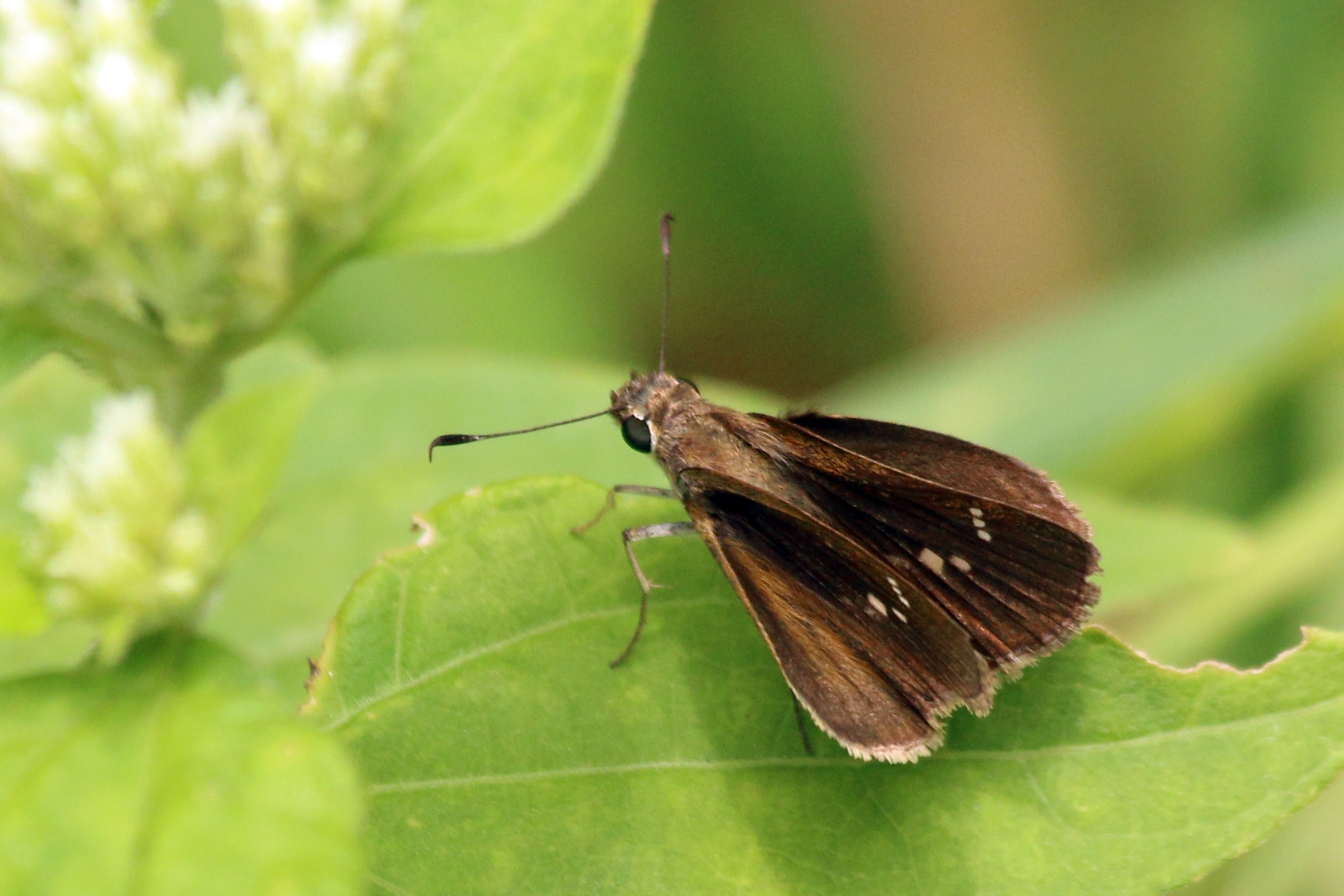
Violet-banded skipper, Nyctelius nyctelius

== Subspecies ==
These two subspecies belong to the species Nyctelius nyctelius:

- Nyctelius nyctelius agari Dillon, 1948
- Nyctelius nyctelius nyctelius (Latreille, 1824)
