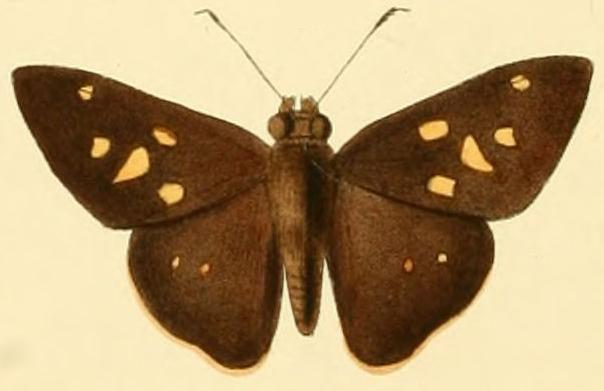
- Saliana chiomara

Scientific classification
- Kingdom: Animalia
- Phylum: Arthropoda
- Class: Insecta
- Order: Lepidoptera
- Family: Hesperiidae
- Subfamily: Hesperiinae
- Tribe: Hesperiini
- Subtribe: Calpodina
- Genus: Saliana; Evans, 1955

= Saliana =

Genus of butterfly

Saliana is a genus of grass skippers in the family Hesperiidae.

== Species ==
- Saliana antoninus (Latreille, [1824])
- Saliana chiomara (Hewitson, 1867)
- Saliana covancae Mielke, 1970
- Saliana esperi Evans, 1955
- Saliana fischer (Latreille, [1824])
- Saliana fusta Evans, 1955
- Saliana hewitsoni (Riley, 1926)
- Saliana longirostris (Sepp, [1840])
- Saliana mamurra (Plötz, 1886)
- Saliana mathiolus (Herrich-Scäffer, 1869)
- Saliana morsa Evans, 1955
- Saliana nigel Evans, 1955
- Saliana placens (Butler, 1874)
- Saliana sala Evans, 1955
- Saliana saladin Evans, 1955
- Saliana salius (Cramer, [1775])
- Saliana salona Evans, 1955
- Saliana severus (Mabille, 1895)
- Saliana triangularis (Kaye, 1914)
- Saliana vixen Evans, 1955
