= Tromba =

Tromba, Italian for trumpet, may refer to:

- Tromba (film), a 1949 Italian-West German thriller film directed by Helmut Weiss
- Tromba (skipper), a genus of skippers
- Tromba, a form of ancestral spirit possession in the Sakalava animism of Madagascar

== See also ==
- Trombas, a town and municipality in north Goiás state, Brazil
