= Carystina =

Scientific classification
- Kingdom: Animalia
- Phylum: Arthropoda
- Class: Insecta
- Order: Lepidoptera
- Family: Hesperiidae
- Subtribe: Carystina
- Genus: Carystina; Evans, 1955

Type species
- Carystus lysiteles Mabille, 1891

Genus of butterflies

Carystina is a genus of skippers in the family Hesperiidae.

== Species ==
Recognised species in the genus Carystina include:

- Carystina discors Plötz, 1882
- Carystina lysiteles Mabille, 1891
