= Oxynthes =

Scientific classification
- Kingdom: Animalia
- Phylum: Arthropoda
- Class: Insecta
- Order: Lepidoptera
- Family: Hesperiidae
- Subtribe: Hesperiina
- Genus: Oxynthes; Godman, 1900

Genus of butterflies

Oxynthes is a genus of skippers in the family Hesperiidae.

== Species ==
Recognised species in the genus Oxynthes include:

- Oxynthes corusca (Herrich Schäffer, 1869)
- Oxynthes trinka (Evans, [1955])

=== Former species ===
- Oxynthes viricuculla Hayward, 1951 - transferred to Noxys viricuculla (Hayward, 1951)
