= Telles =

Scientific classification
- Kingdom: Animalia
- Phylum: Arthropoda
- Class: Insecta
- Order: Lepidoptera
- Family: Hesperiidae
- Subtribe: Calpodina
- Genus: Telles; Godman, 1900

Genus of butterflies

Telles is a genus of skipper butterflies in the family Hesperiidae.

== Species ==
The following species are recognised in the genus Telles:

- Telles arcalaus (Stoll, 1782)
- Telles pyrex Evans, 1955
