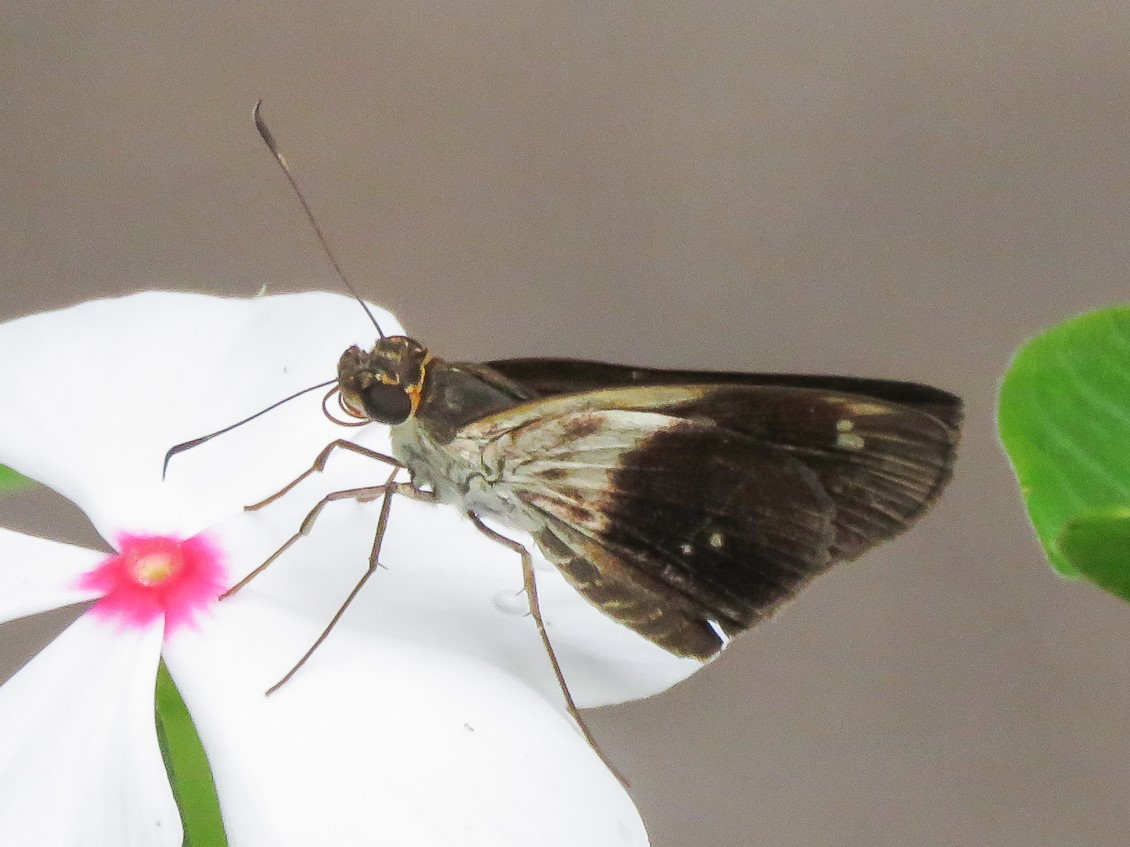
- Justinia phaetusa

Scientific classification
- Kingdom: Animalia
- Phylum: Arthropoda
- Clade: Pancrustacea
- Class: Insecta
- Order: Lepidoptera
- Family: Hesperiidae
- Subtribe: Falgina
- Genus: Justinia; Evans, 1955

= Justinia =

Genus of butterflies

Justinia is a genus of skippers in the family Hesperiidae.

== Species ==
Recognised species in the genus Justinia include:

- Justinia justinianus (Latreille, [1824])

=== Former species ===
- Justinia gertschi (Bell, 1937) - transferred to Rhomba gertschi (Bell, 1937)
- Justinia kora (Hewitson, 1877) - transferred to Koria kora (Hewitson, 1877)
