= Pseudocopaeodes =

Scientific classification
- Kingdom: Animalia
- Phylum: Arthropoda
- Class: Insecta
- Order: Lepidoptera
- Family: Hesperiidae
- Subfamily: Hesperiinae
- Tribe: Hesperiini
- Subtribe: Hesperiina
- Genus: Pseudocopaeodes; Skinner & Williams, 1923

Synonyms
- Pseudocopaedes

Genus of butterflies

Pseudocopaeodes is a genus of skipper butterflies in the family Hesperiidae.

== Species ==
- Pseudocopaeodes eunus - alkali skipper
