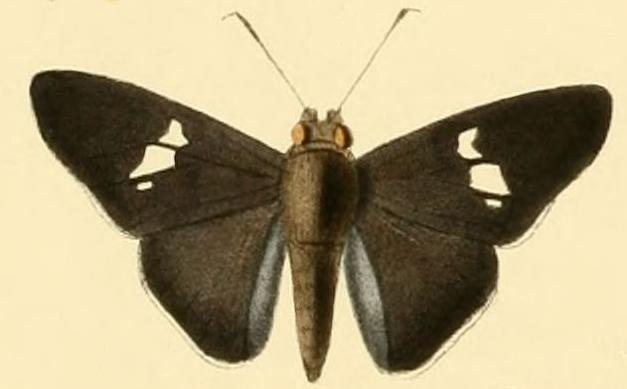
- Plate: Hesperia II Hesperia cincia accepted as Neoxeniades cincia

Scientific classification
- Kingdom: Animalia
- Phylum: Arthropoda
- Class: Insecta
- Order: Lepidoptera
- Family: Hesperiidae
- Subfamily: Hesperiinae
- Tribe: Hesperiini
- Subtribe: Carystina
- Genus: Neoxeniades; Hayward, 1938

Synonyms
- Turmada Evans, 1955

= Neoxeniades =

Genus of butterflies

Neoxeniades is a genus of skippers in the family Hesperiidae.

== Species ==
Recognised species in the genus Neoxeniades include:

- Neoxeniades anchicayensis Steinhauser, 2007
- Neoxeniades bajula (Schaus, 1902)
- Neoxeniades sp. Burns04
- Neoxeniades braesia (Hewitson, 1867)
- Neoxeniades cincia (Hewitson, 1867)
- Neoxeniades ethoda (Hewitson, [1866])
- Neoxeniades gabina (Godman, 1900)
- Neoxeniades luda (Hewitson, 1877)
- Neoxeniades molion (Godman, [1901])
- Neoxeniades musarion Hayward, 1938
- Neoxeniades myra Evans, 1955
- Neoxeniades parna (Evans, 1955)
- Neoxeniades pluviasilva Burns, 2007
- Neoxeniades scipio (Fabricius, 1793)
- Neoxeniades tropa Evans, 1955
- Neoxeniades turmada (Druce, 1912) - Ecuador
