= Paratrytone =

Scientific classification
- Kingdom: Animalia
- Phylum: Arthropoda
- Class: Insecta
- Order: Lepidoptera
- Family: Hesperiidae
- Subtribe: Hesperiina
- Genus: Paratrytone; Godman, [1900]

Genus of butterflies

Paratrytone is a genus of skippers in the family Hesperiidae.

== Species ==
Recognised species in the genus Paratrytone include:

- Paratrytone aphractoia Dyar, 1914
- Paratrytone polyclea Godman, [1900]
- Paratrytone rhexenor Godman, [1900]
- Paratrytone samenta (Dyar, 1914)
- Paratrytone snowi Edwards, 1877

=== Former species ===
- Paratrytone browni Bell, 1959 - transferred to Brownus browni (Bell, 1959)
