= Dubiella =

Scientific classification
- Kingdom: Animalia
- Phylum: Arthropoda
- Class: Insecta
- Order: Lepidoptera
- Family: Hesperiidae
- Subtribe: Calpodina
- Genus: Dubiella; Evans, 1936

Genus of butterflies

Dubiella is a genus of skippers in the family Hesperiidae.

== Species ==
Recognised species in the genus Dubiella include:

- Dubiella comitana Freeman, 1969
- Dubiella dubius (Stoll, 1781)
- Dubiella fiscella (Hewitson, 1877)
