= Thargella =

Scientific classification
- Kingdom: Animalia
- Phylum: Arthropoda
- Class: Insecta
- Order: Lepidoptera
- Family: Hesperiidae
- Subtribe: Falgina
- Genus: Thargella; Godman, 1900

Genus of butterflies

Thargella is a genus of skippers in the family Hesperiidae.

== Species ==
Recognised species in the genus Thargella include:

- Thargella caura (Plötz, 1882)
- Thargella tristissimus (Schaus, 1902)
- Thargella volasus (Godman, 1901)
