= Libra (skipper) =

Scientific classification
- Kingdom: Animalia
- Phylum: Arthropoda
- Class: Insecta
- Order: Lepidoptera
- Family: Hesperiidae
- Tribe: Hesperiini
- Genus: Libra; Evans, 1955

Genus of butterflies

Libra is a genus of skippers in the family Hesperiidae.
