= Conga (skipper) =

Scientific classification
- Kingdom: Animalia
- Phylum: Arthropoda
- Class: Insecta
- Order: Lepidoptera
- Family: Hesperiidae
- Subtribe: Hesperiina
- Genus: Conga; Evans, 1955

Genus of butterflies

Conga is a genus of skippers in the family Hesperiidae.

== Species ==
Recognised species in the genus Conga include:

- Conga chydaea (Butler, 1877)
- Conga immaculata (Bell, 1930)
- Conga urqua (Schaus, 1902)
- Conga zela (Plötz, 1883)
