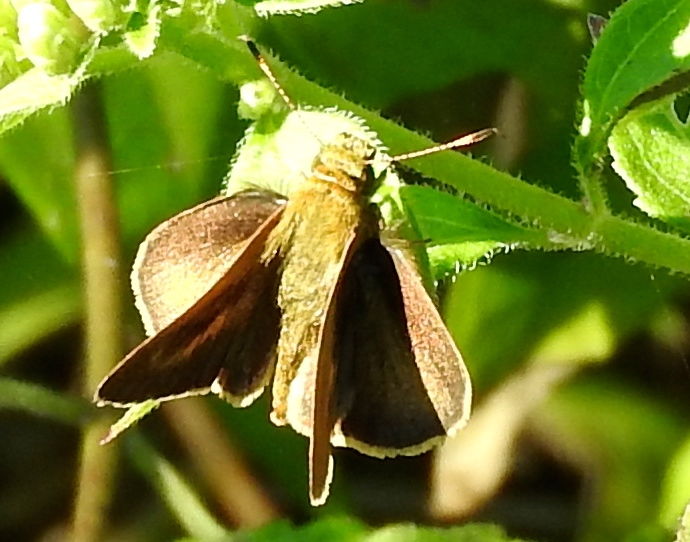
- Synapte pecta

Scientific classification
- Kingdom: Animalia
- Phylum: Arthropoda
- Class: Insecta
- Order: Lepidoptera
- Family: Hesperiidae
- Subtribe: Falgina
- Genus: Synapte; Mabille, 1904

= Synapte =

Genus of butterflies

Synapte is a genus of skippers in the family Hesperiidae.
