= Damas (skipper) =

Scientific classification
- Kingdom: Animalia
- Phylum: Arthropoda
- Class: Insecta
- Order: Lepidoptera
- Family: Hesperiidae
- Subtribe: Carystina
- Genus: Damas; Godman, [1901]

Genus of butterflies

Damas is a genus of skippers in the family Hesperiidae.

== Species ==
Recognised species in the genus Damas include:

- Damas clavus (Herrich-Schäffer, 1869)
- Damas immacula Nicolay, 1973
