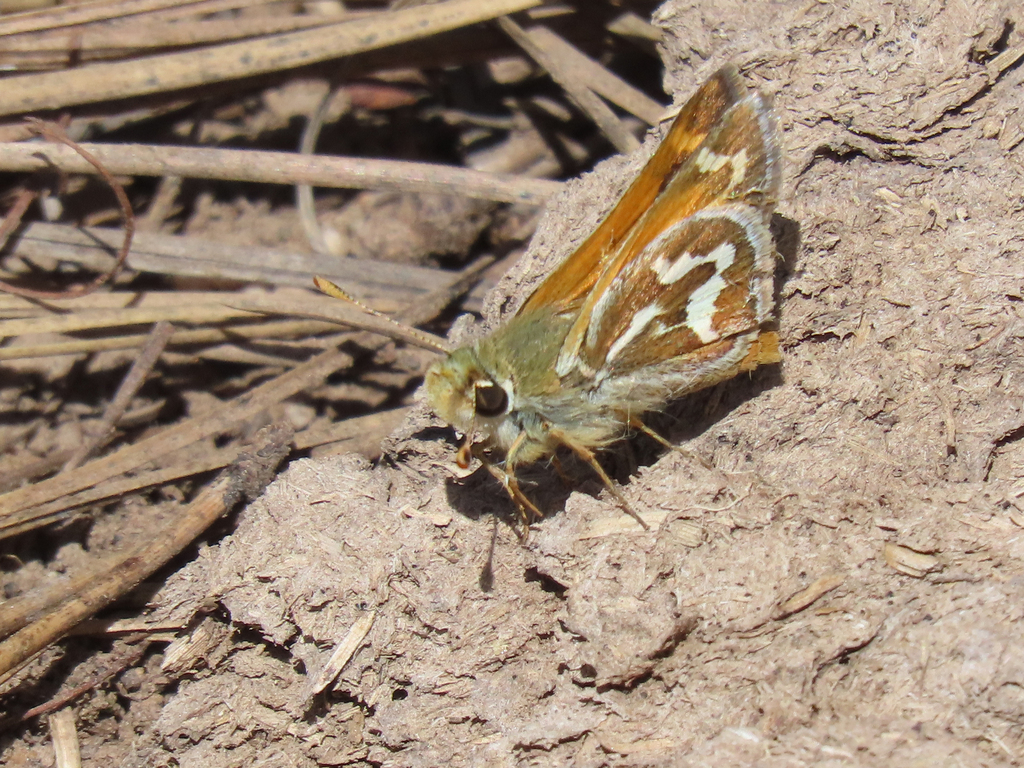

Conservation status
- Vulnerable (NatureServe)

Scientific classification
- Kingdom: Animalia
- Phylum: Arthropoda
- Class: Insecta
- Order: Lepidoptera
- Family: Hesperiidae
- Genus: Stinga
- Species: S. morrisoni

Binomial name
- Stinga morrisoni (W. H. Edwards, 1878)

= Stinga morrisoni =

Species of butterfly

Stinga morrisoni, or Morrison's skipper, is a species of grass skipper in the butterfly family Hesperiidae. It is found in North America.

The MONA or Hodges number for Stinga morrisoni is 4017.
