= Tirynthoides =

Scientific classification
- Kingdom: Animalia
- Phylum: Arthropoda
- Class: Insecta
- Order: Lepidoptera
- Family: Hesperiidae
- Tribe: Hesperiini
- Genus: Tirynthoides; Bell, 1940

Genus of butterflies

Tirynthoides is a genus of skipper butterflies in the family Hesperiidae.
