= Megaleas =

Scientific classification
- Kingdom: Animalia
- Phylum: Arthropoda
- Class: Insecta
- Order: Lepidoptera
- Family: Hesperiidae
- Subtribe: Carystina
- Genus: Megaleas; Godman, 1901

Genus of butterflies

For the ancient individual, see Megaleas of Macedon

Megaleas is a genus of skippers in the family Hesperiidae.
