= Coolus bushi =

Scientific classification
- Kingdom: Animalia
- Phylum: Arthropoda
- Class: Insecta
- Order: Lepidoptera
- Family: Hesperiidae
- Subfamily: Hesperiinae
- Tribe: Hesperiini
- Subtribe: Carystina
- Genus: Coolus; Grishin, 2019
- Species: C. bushi

Binomial name
- Coolus bushi (Watson, 1937)

Synonyms
- (Species): Rhinthon bushi Watson, 1937

Genus of butterflies

Coolus bushi is a species of skipper butterfly in the family Hesperiidae. It is the only species in the monotypic genus Coolus.
