= Oeonus (skipper) =

Scientific classification
- Kingdom: Animalia
- Phylum: Arthropoda
- Class: Insecta
- Order: Lepidoptera
- Family: Hesperiidae
- Subtribe: Hesperiina
- Genus: Oeonus; Godman, 1900

Genus of butterflies

Oeonus is a genus of skippers in the family Hesperiidae.

== Species ==
Recognised species in the genus Oeonus include:

- Oeonus pyste Godman, 1900

=== Former species ===
- Oeonus brunnescens Hayward, 1939 - transferred to Naevolus brunnescens (Hayward, 1939)
- Oeonus garima Schaus, 1902 - transferred to Gallio garima (Schaus, 1902)
- Oeonus immaculatus Hayward, 1940 - transferred to Ralis immaculatus (Hayward, 1940)
- Oeonus subviridis Hayward, 1940 - transferred to Viridina subviridis (Hayward, 1940)
- Oeonus zenus Bell, 1942 - transferred to Alychna zenus (Bell, 1942)
