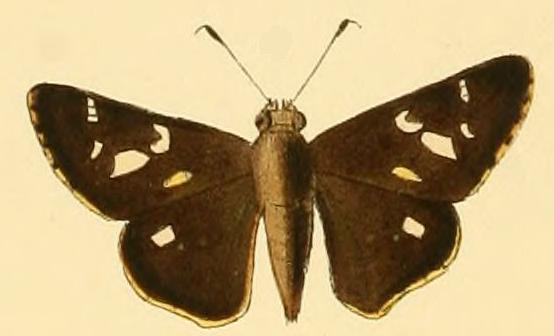
- Vacerra bonfilius

Scientific classification
- Kingdom: Animalia
- Phylum: Arthropoda
- Class: Insecta
- Order: Lepidoptera
- Family: Hesperiidae
- Tribe: Hesperiini
- Genus: Vacerra; Godman in Godman & Salvin, [1900]

= Vacerra =

Genus of butterflies

Vacerra is a genus of skippers in the family Hesperiidae.

== Species ==
- Vacerra bonfilius (Latreille, [1824])
- Vacerra caniola (Herrich-Schäffer, 1869)
- Vacerra cervara Steinhauser, 1974
- Vacerra egla (Hewitson, 1877)
- Vacerra evansi Hayward, 1938
- Vacerra hermesia (Hewitson, 1870)
- Vacerra lachares Godman, [1900]

=== Former species ===
- Vacerra molla Bell, 1959 - synonymized with Barrolla barroni Evans, 1955
