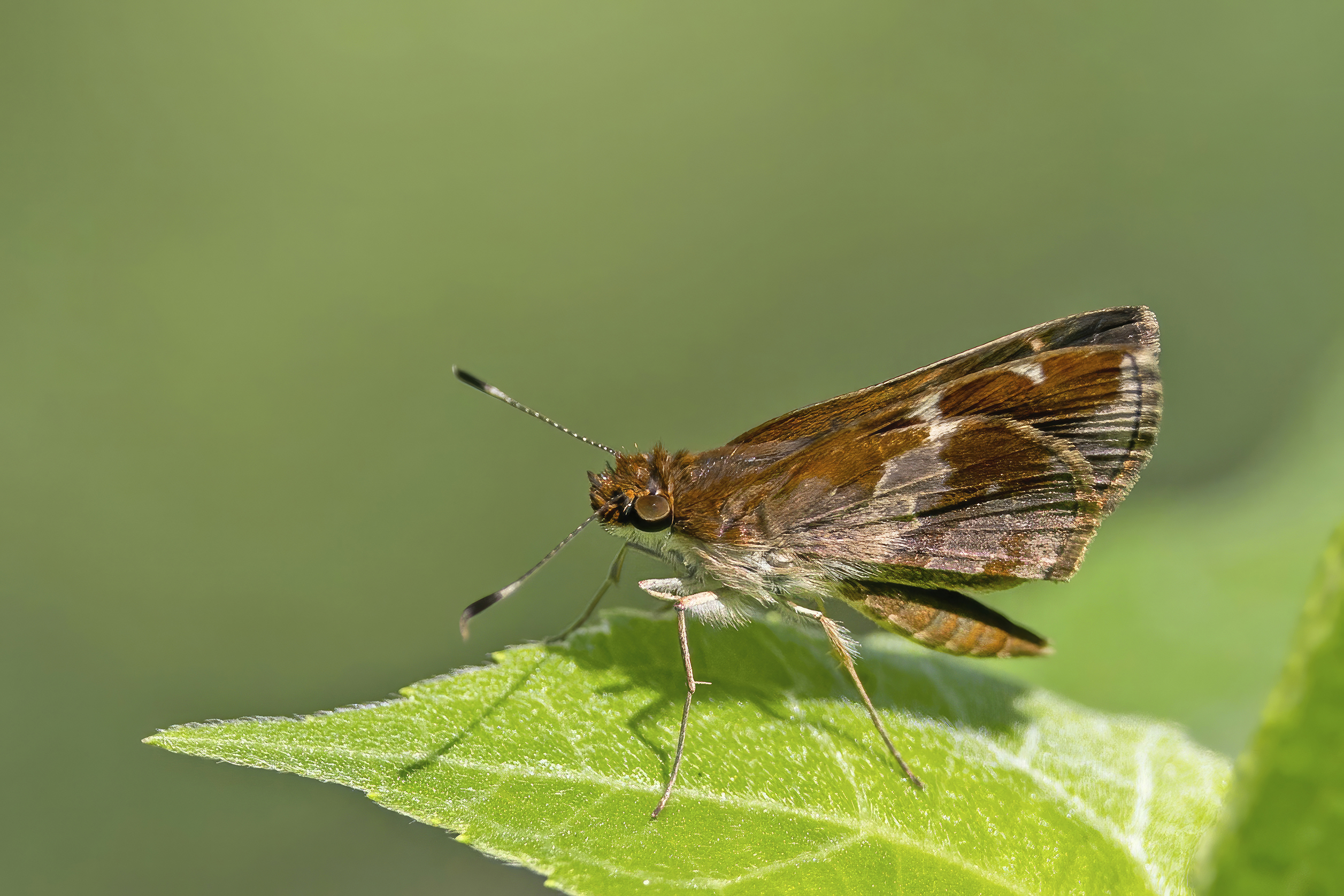
- In Honduras

Scientific classification
- Kingdom: Animalia
- Phylum: Arthropoda
- Class: Insecta
- Order: Lepidoptera
- Family: Hesperiidae
- Genus: Monca
- Species: M. crispinus

Binomial name
- Monca crispinus (Plötz, 1882)

Synonyms
- Monca tyrtaeus (Plötz, 1882)

= Monca crispinus =

Violet-patched skipper

Species of butterfly

Monca crispinus, the violet-patched skipper, is a species of grass skipper in the family of butterflies known as Hesperiidae. It is found in North and Central America.

The MONA or Hodges number for Monca crispinus is 3992.
