= Flaccilla aecas =

Scientific classification
- Kingdom: Animalia
- Phylum: Arthropoda
- Class: Insecta
- Order: Lepidoptera
- Family: Hesperiidae
- Tribe: Hesperiini
- Subtribe: Falgina
- Genus: Flaccilla; Godman in Godman & Salvin, [1901]
- Species: F. aecas

Binomial name
- Flaccilla aecas (Stoll, [1781])

Species of butterfly

Flaccilla aecas, the aecas ruby-eye, is a species of skipper butterfly in the family Hesperiidae. It is the only species in the monotypic genus Flaccilla. It is found from Mexico to southern Brazil.
