= Tellona =

Tellona variegata

Scientific classification
- Kingdom: Animalia
- Phylum: Arthropoda
- Class: Insecta
- Order: Lepidoptera
- Family: Hesperiidae
- Subtribe: Carystina
- Genus: Tellona; Evans, 1955
- Species: T. variegata

Binomial name
- Tellona variegata (Hewitson, 1870)

Synonyms
- Hesperia variegata Hewitson, 1870

Genus of butterflies

Tellona is a genus of skippers in the family Hesperiidae. It is monotypic, being represented by the single species Tellona variegata.
