= Limochores =

Scientific classification
- Kingdom: Animalia
- Phylum: Arthropoda
- Class: Insecta
- Order: Lepidoptera
- Family: Hesperiidae
- Subtribe: Hesperiina
- Genus: Limochores; Scudder, 1872

Genus of butterflies

Limochores is a genus of skippers in the family Hesperiidae.

== Species ==
Recognised species include:

- Limochores catahorma (Dyar, 1916)
- Limochores pupillus (Plötz, 1882)
