= Turesis =

Scientific classification
- Kingdom: Animalia
- Phylum: Arthropoda
- Class: Insecta
- Order: Lepidoptera
- Family: Hesperiidae
- Subtribe: Falgina
- Genus: Turesis; Godman, 1901

Genus of butterflies

Turesis is a genus of skippers in the family Hesperiidae.
