= Evansiella =

Scientific classification
- Kingdom: Animalia
- Phylum: Arthropoda
- Class: Insecta
- Order: Lepidoptera
- Family: Hesperiidae
- Subtribe: Carystina
- Genus: Evansiella; Hayward, 1948

Genus of butterflies

Evansiella is a genus of skippers in the family Hesperiidae.
