= Orthos (skipper) =

Scientific classification
- Kingdom: Animalia
- Phylum: Arthropoda
- Class: Insecta
- Order: Lepidoptera
- Family: Hesperiidae
- Subtribe: Carystina
- Genus: Orthos; Evans, 1955

Genus of butterflies

Orthos is a genus of skippers in the family Hesperiidae.

== Species ==
Recognised species in the genus Orthos include:

- Orthos orthos (Godman, [1900])

=== Former species ===
- Orthos gabina (Godman, 1900) - transferred to Neoxeniades gabina (Godman, 1900)
- Orthos lycortas (Godman, 1900) - transferred to Corta lycortas (Godman, 1900)
- Orthos trinka Evans, 1955 - transferred to Oxynthes trinka (Evans, 1955)
