= Cynea =

Scientific classification
- Kingdom: Animalia
- Phylum: Arthropoda
- Class: Insecta
- Order: Lepidoptera
- Family: Hesperiidae
- Tribe: Hesperiini
- Genus: Cynea; Evans, 1955

Genus of butterflies

Cynea is a genus of skippers in the family Hesperiidae.

== Species ==
Recognised species in the genus Cynea include:

- Cynea cannae (Herrich-Schaffer, 1869)
- Cynea corisana (Plötz, 1882)
- Cynea cynea (Hewitson, 1876)
- Cynea cyrus (Plötz, 1883)
- Cynea diluta (Herrich-Schäffer, 1869)
- Cynea hycsos (Mabille, 1891)
- Cynea iquita (Bell, 1941)
- Cynea irma (Möschler, 1878)
- Cynea melius (Geyer, 1832)
- Cynea robba Evans, [1955]

=== Former species ===
- Cynea osembo (Stoll, 1782) - synonymized to Cymaenes diluta (Herrich-Schäffer, 1869)
