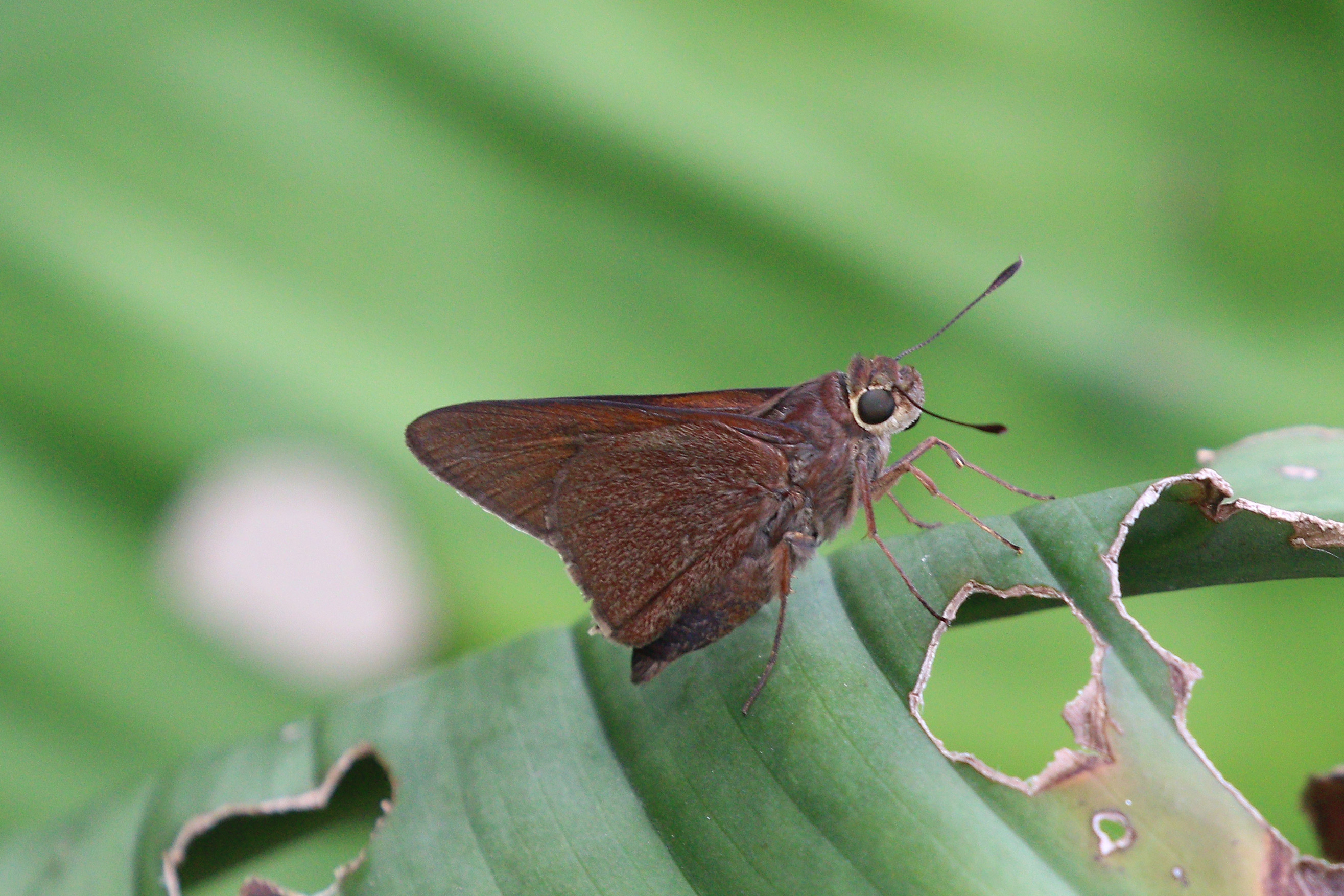
- C. capucinus Grand Cayman

Scientific classification
- Kingdom: Animalia
- Phylum: Arthropoda
- Clade: Pancrustacea
- Class: Insecta
- Order: Lepidoptera
- Family: Hesperiidae
- Subtribe: Anthoptina
- Genus: Choranthus; Scudder, [1872]

Synonyms
- Pyrrhocalles Mabille, 1904; Asbolis Mabille, 1904

= Choranthus =

Genus of butterflies

Choranthus is a genus of skippers in the family Hesperiidae.

== Species ==
Recognised species in the genus Choranthus include:

- Choranthus antiqua (Herrich-Schäffer, 1863)
- Choranthus borincona (Watson, 1937)
- Choranthus capucinus (Lucas, 1857)
- Choranthus haitensis Skinner, 1920
- Choranthus jamaicensis (Schaus, 1902)
- Choranthus lilliae E. Bell, 1931
- Choranthus melissa Gali, 1983
- Choranthus orientis (Skinner, 1920)
- Choranthus radians Lucas, 1857
- Choranthus richmondi Miller, [1966]
- Choranthus serranorum Álvarez & Núñez, 2024
- Choranthus vitellius Fabricius, 1793
