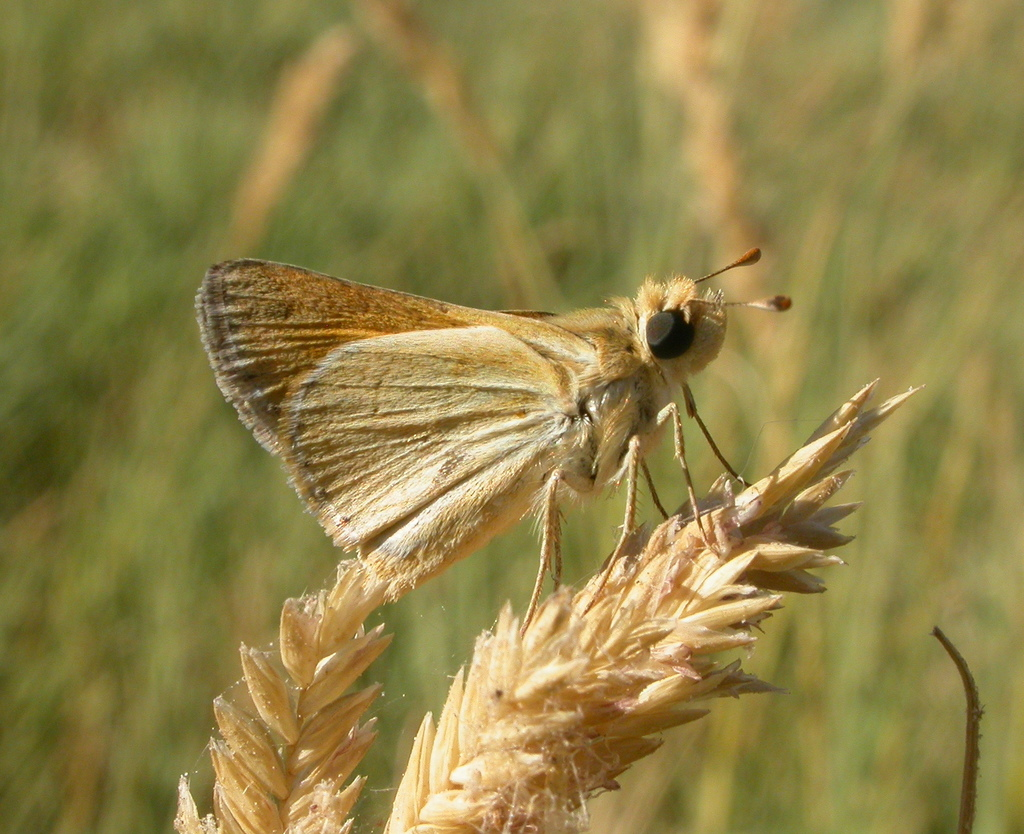

Conservation status
- Vulnerable (NatureServe)

Scientific classification
- Kingdom: Animalia
- Phylum: Arthropoda
- Class: Insecta
- Order: Lepidoptera
- Family: Hesperiidae
- Genus: Pseudocopaeodes
- Species: P. eunus

Binomial name
- Pseudocopaeodes eunus (Edwards, 1881)

Synonyms
- Copaeodes eunus Edwards, 1881; Copaeodes wrightii Edwards, 1882; Copaeodes chromis Skinner, 1919

= Pseudocopaeodes eunus =

Species of butterfly

Pseudocopaeodes eunus is a rare species of butterfly known by the common name alkali skipper. It is native to northern California and Nevada in the United States, and Baja California in Mexico. There are five subspecies. One, P. e. obscurus, the Carson wandering skipper, is treated as a federally listed endangered species of the United States. As of 2007 there are four known populations.

This butterfly is brownish to yellowish orange on the upper side and yellowish below. It is 2.5 to 3.2 centimeters in length.

This species occurs on alkali flats. The caterpillar of the species feeds on saltgrass (Distichlis spicata var. stricta). There is little other information about the biology of the species.

== Subspecies ==
- Pseudocopaeodes eunus eunus
- Pseudocopaeodes eunus alinea Scott, 1981
- Pseudocopaeodes eunus chromis (Skinner, 1919) (Mexico)
- Pseudocopaeodes eunus obscurus Austin & Emmel, 1998 (eastern California, Nevada)
- Pseudocopaeodes eunus flavus Austin & Emmel, 1998 (Nevada)
