= Chloeria =

Scientific classification
- Kingdom: Animalia
- Phylum: Arthropoda
- Class: Insecta
- Order: Lepidoptera
- Family: Hesperiidae
- Subtribe: Calpodina
- Genus: Chloeria; Mabille, [1904]

Genus of butterflies

Chloeria is a genus of skippers in the family Hesperiidae.

== Species ==
- Chloeria psittacina
