= Buzyges (butterfly) =

Scientific classification
- Kingdom: Animalia
- Phylum: Arthropoda
- Class: Insecta
- Order: Lepidoptera
- Family: Hesperiidae
- Subtribe: Hesperiina
- Genus: Buzyges; Godman, 1900

Genus of butterflies

Buzyges is a genus of skippers in the family Hesperiidae.

== Species ==
Recognised species in the genus Buzyges include:

- Buzyges idothea Godman, [1900]

=== Former species ===
- Buzyges mellanaformis Austin & Warren, 2009 - transferred to Buzella mellanaformis (Austin & Warren, 2009)
