= Molo (butterfly) =

Scientific classification
- Kingdom: Animalia
- Phylum: Arthropoda
- Class: Insecta
- Order: Lepidoptera
- Family: Hesperiidae
- Subtribe: Carystina
- Genus: Molo; Godman, 1900

Genus of butterflies

Molo is a genus of skippers in the family Hesperiidae. Small (wingspan about 25 millimeters), brown and orange smugglers. These species are quite variable, the species of brown and orange varies widely within a species, some individuals also have white spots instead of orange. As is common in Hesperiini, it is almost impossible to recognize the genus only on the outer appearance.

== Species ==
Recognised species in the genus Molo include:

- Molo mango Guenée, 1865
- Molo pelta (Evans, 1955)

=== Former species ===
- Molo calcarea Schaus, 1902 - transferred to Psoralis calcarea (Schaus, 1902)
- Molo visendus (Bell, 1942) - transferred to Psoralis visendus (Bell, 1942)
