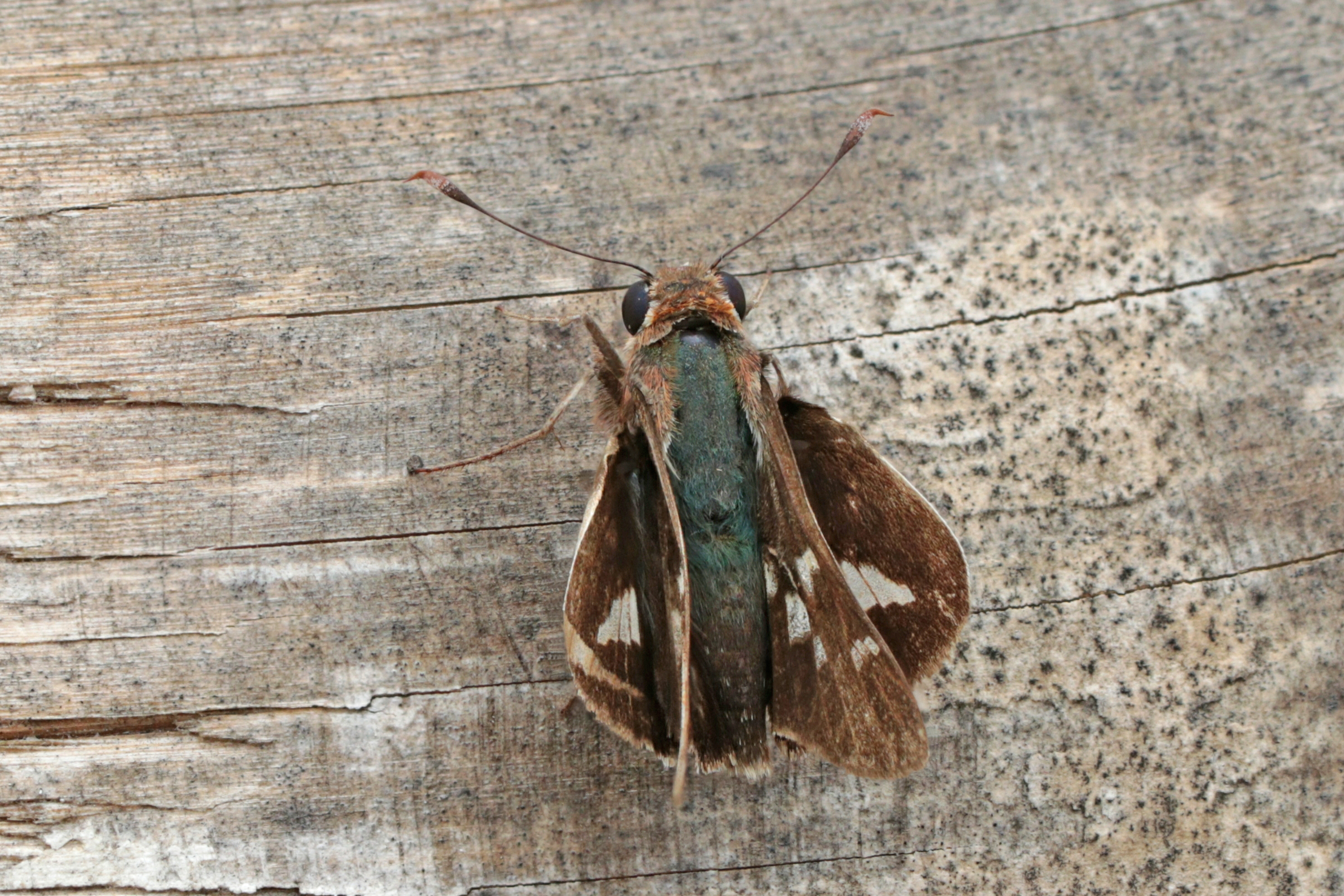

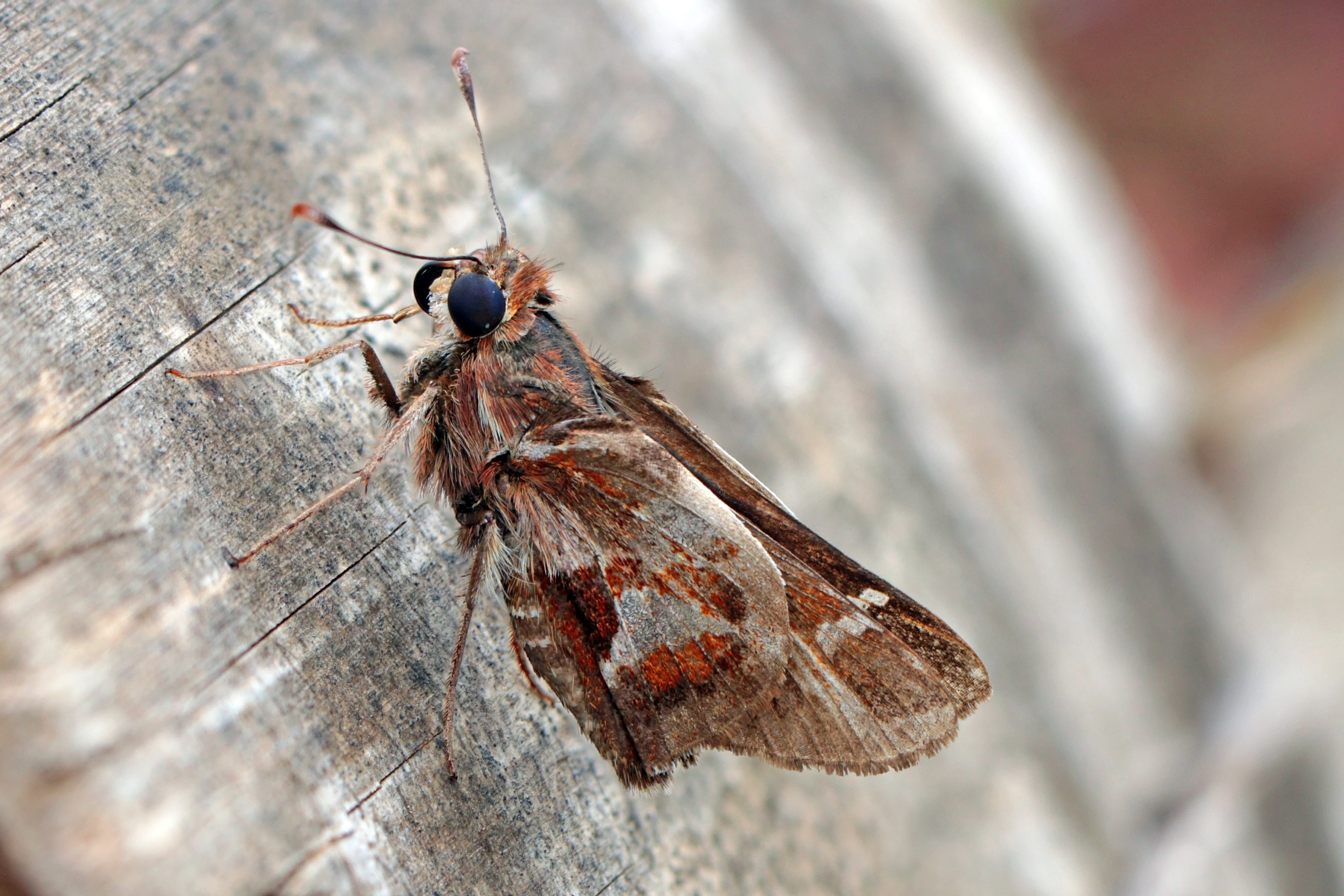
- both, Alajuela, Costa Rica

Scientific classification
- Kingdom: Animalia
- Phylum: Arthropoda
- Class: Insecta
- Order: Lepidoptera
- Family: Hesperiidae
- Tribe: Hesperiini
- Genus: Thespieus; Godman in Godman & Salvin, [1900]

= Thespieus =

Genus of butterflies

Thespieus is a genus of skipper butterflies in the family Hesperiidae.

== Species ==
- Thespieus abatira (J. Zikán, 1938)
- Thespieus abauna (J. Zikán, 1938)
- Thespieus argentina Draudt, 1923
- Thespieus aspernatus Draudt, 1923
- Thespieus caraca Evans, 1955
- Thespieus castor Hayward, 1948
- Thespieus catochra (Plötz, 1882)
- Thespieus dalman (Latreille, [1824])
- Thespieus duidensis Bell, 1932
- Thespieus ethemides (Burmeister, 1878)
- Thespieus fassli (Draudt, 1923)
- Thespieus fulvangula (Weymer, 1890)
- Thespieus haywardi Evans, 1937
- Thespieus hieroglyphica Draudt, 1923
- Thespieus himella (Hewitson, 1868)
- Thespieus homochromus Mielke, 1978
- Thespieus inez Nicolay, 1973
- Thespieus jora Evans, 1955
- Thespieus lutetia (Hewitson, [1866])
- Thespieus macareus (Herrich-Schäffer, 1869)
- Thespieus matucanae Lindsey, 1925
- Thespieus opigena (Hewitson, 1866)
- Thespieus othna (Butler, 1870)
- Thespieus peruviae Lindsey, 1925
- Thespieus pinda Evans, 1955
- Thespieus tapayuna (J. Zikán, 1938)
- Thespieus thona Evans, 1955
- Thespieus tihoneta (Weeks, 1901)
- Thespieus vividus (Mabille, 1891)
- Thespieus xarina Hayward, 1948
- Thespieus xarippe (Butler, 1870)
- Thespieus zikani Mielke, 1971
