= Metron (skipper) =

Scientific classification
- Kingdom: Animalia
- Phylum: Arthropoda
- Class: Insecta
- Order: Lepidoptera
- Family: Hesperiidae
- Tribe: Hesperiini
- Genus: Metron; Godman, 1900

Genus of butterflies

Metron is a genus of skippers in the family Hesperiidae.

== Species ==
Recognised species include:

- Metron chrysogastra Butler, 1870
- Metron fasciata (Möschler, 1877)
- Metron hypochlora (Draudt, 1923)
- Metron noctis (Kaye, 1913)
- Metron oropa Hewitson, 1877
- Metron voranus (Mabille, 1891)
- Metron zimra (Hewitson, 1877)
