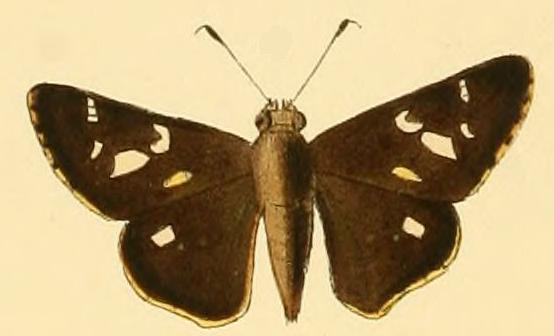

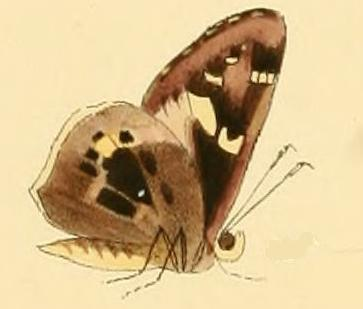

Scientific classification
- Kingdom: Animalia
- Phylum: Arthropoda
- Class: Insecta
- Order: Lepidoptera
- Family: Hesperiidae
- Genus: Vacerra
- Species: V. bonfilius

Binomial name
- Vacerra bonfilius (Latreille, [1824])

Synonyms
- Hesperia bonfilius Latreille, [1824]; Goniloba caprotina Herrich-Schäffer, 1869; Goniloba caprotina Herrich-Schäffer, 1868; Hesperia archytas Plötz, 1882 (nom. nud.); Hesperia aeas Plötz, 1882; Hesperia cabenta Plötz, 1882; Hesperia litana Hewitson, [1866]

= Vacerra bonfilius =

Species of butterfly

Vacerra bonfilius is a butterfly in the family Hesperiidae. It is found in Panama, Brazil, Bolivia and Venezuela.

== Subspecies ==
- Vacerra bonfilius bonfilius (Brazil)
- Vacerra bonfilius aeas (Plötz, 1882) (Panama)
- Vacerra bonfilius bonta Evans, 1955 (Bolivia)
- Vacerra bonfilius litana (Hewitson, 1866) (Venezuela)
