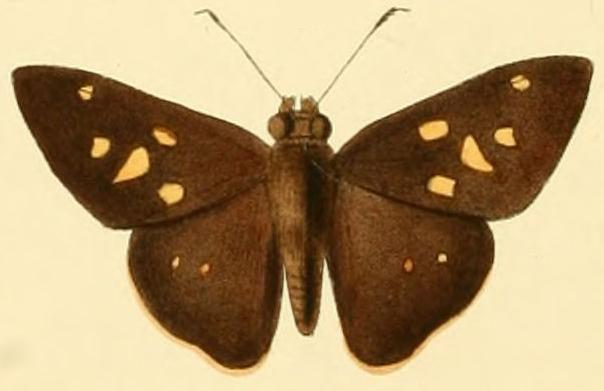

Scientific classification
- Kingdom: Animalia
- Phylum: Arthropoda
- Class: Insecta
- Order: Lepidoptera
- Family: Hesperiidae
- Genus: Saliana
- Species: S. chiomara

Binomial name
- Saliana chiomara (Hewitson, 1867)

Synonyms
- Hesperia chiomara Hewitson, 1867; Talides chiomara

= Saliana chiomara =

Species of butterfly

Saliana chiomara is a butterfly in the family Hesperiidae. It is found from Panama to the Brazilian states of Pará and Amazonas.
