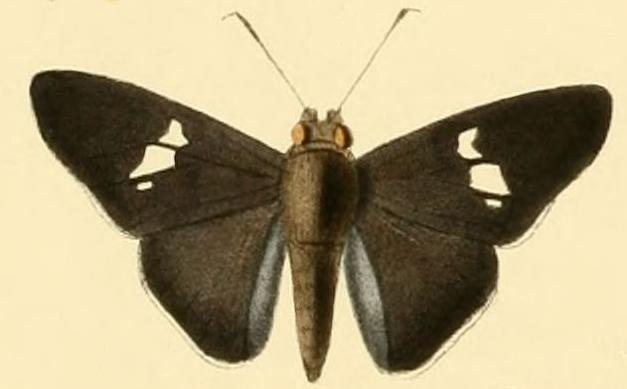

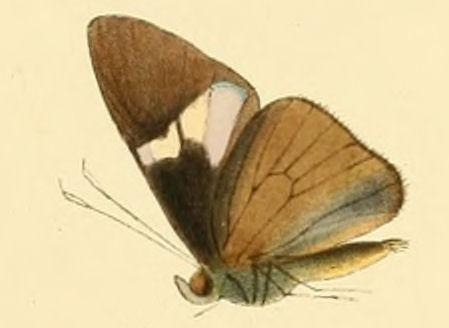

Scientific classification
- Kingdom: Animalia
- Phylum: Arthropoda
- Class: Insecta
- Order: Lepidoptera
- Family: Hesperiidae
- Genus: Neoxeniades
- Species: N. cincia

Binomial name
- Neoxeniades cincia (Hewitson, 1867)

Synonyms
- Hesperia cincia Hewitson, 1867

= Neoxeniades cincia =

Species of butterfly

Neoxeniades cincia is a butterfly in the family Hesperiidae. It is found in Pará, Brazil.
