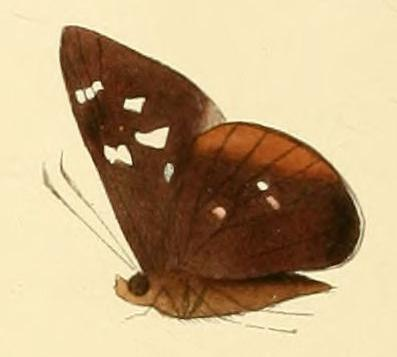

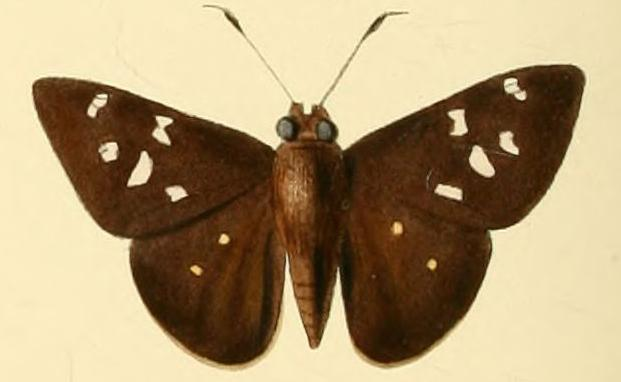

Scientific classification
- Kingdom: Animalia
- Phylum: Arthropoda
- Class: Insecta
- Order: Lepidoptera
- Family: Hesperiidae
- Genus: Tisias
- Species: T. caesena

Binomial name
- Tisias caesena (Hewitson, 1867)

Synonyms
- Hesperia caesena Hewitson, 1867

= Tisias caesena =

Species of butterfly

Tisias caesena is a butterfly in the family Hesperiidae. It is found in Brazil.
