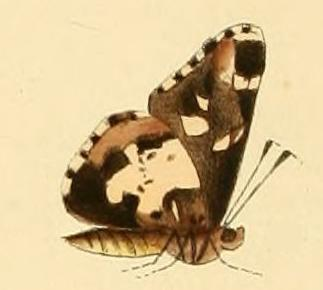

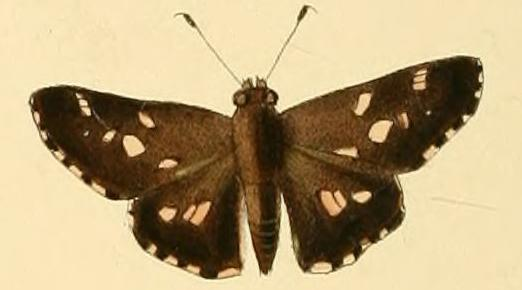

Scientific classification
- Kingdom: Animalia
- Phylum: Arthropoda
- Class: Insecta
- Order: Lepidoptera
- Family: Hesperiidae
- Genus: Thespieus
- Species: T. himella

Binomial name
- Thespieus himella (Hewitson, 1868)

Synonyms
- Hesperia himella Hewitson, 1868; Goniloba calus Herrich-Schäffer, 1869

= Thespieus himella =

Species of butterfly

Thespieus himella is a butterfly in the family Hesperiidae. It is found in Rio de Janeiro, Brazil.
