= Asbolis capucinus =

Scientific classification
- Kingdom: Animalia
- Phylum: Arthropoda
- Clade: Pancrustacea
- Class: Insecta
- Order: Lepidoptera
- Family: Hesperiidae
- Genus: Asbolis
- Species: A. capucinus

Binomial name
- Asbolis capucinus (Lucas, 1857)

Species of butterfly

Asbolis capucinus, the monk skipper, is a species of skipper in the family Hesperiidae. Its range includes South Florida and the West Indies.
