= Neoxeniades anchicayensis =

Scientific classification
- Kingdom: Animalia
- Phylum: Arthropoda
- Class: Insecta
- Order: Lepidoptera
- Family: Hesperiidae
- Genus: Neoxeniades
- Species: N. anchicayensis

Binomial name
- Neoxeniades anchicayensis Steinhauser, 2007

Species of butterfly

Neoxeniades anchicayensis is a butterfly in the family Hesperiidae. It is found in Colombia.
