= Phemiades =

Scientific classification
- Kingdom: Animalia
- Phylum: Arthropoda
- Class: Insecta
- Order: Lepidoptera
- Family: Hesperiidae
- Tribe: Hesperiini
- Genus: Phemiades; Hübner, 1819

Genus of butterflies

Phemiades is a genus of skippers in the family Hesperiidae.
