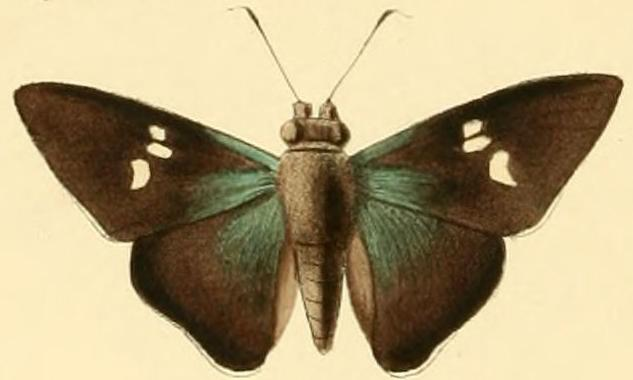

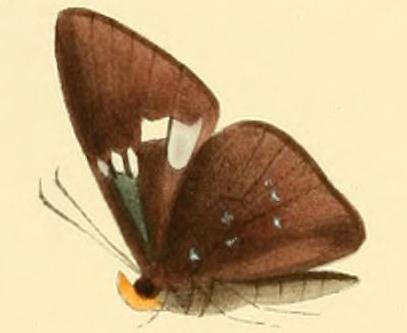

Scientific classification
- Kingdom: Animalia
- Phylum: Arthropoda
- Class: Insecta
- Order: Lepidoptera
- Family: Hesperiidae
- Genus: Thracides
- Species: T. cilissa

Binomial name
- Thracides cilissa Hewitson, 1867

Synonyms
- Hesperia smaragdinus Herrich-Schäffer, 1869

= Thracides cilissa =

Species of butterfly

Thracides cilissa is a butterfly in the family Hesperiidae. It is found in Pará, Brazil.
