= Tirynthia =

Scientific classification
- Kingdom: Animalia
- Phylum: Arthropoda
- Class: Insecta
- Order: Lepidoptera
- Family: Hesperiidae
- Tribe: Hesperiini
- Genus: Tirynthia; Godman, [1900]

Genus of butterflies

Tirynthia is a genus of skipper butterflies in the family Hesperiidae.

== Species ==
Recognised species in the genus Tirynthia include:

- Tirynthia conda Evans, [1955]
- Tirynthia conflua Herrich-Schäffer, 1869
