= Stinga =

Scientific classification
- Kingdom: Animalia
- Phylum: Arthropoda
- Class: Insecta
- Order: Lepidoptera
- Family: Hesperiidae
- Subtribe: Hesperiina
- Genus: Stinga; Evans, 1955

Genus of butterflies

Stinga is a genus of skippers in the family Hesperiidae.

== Species ==
Recognised species in the genus Stinga include:

- Stinga morrisoni (Edwards, 1878)
