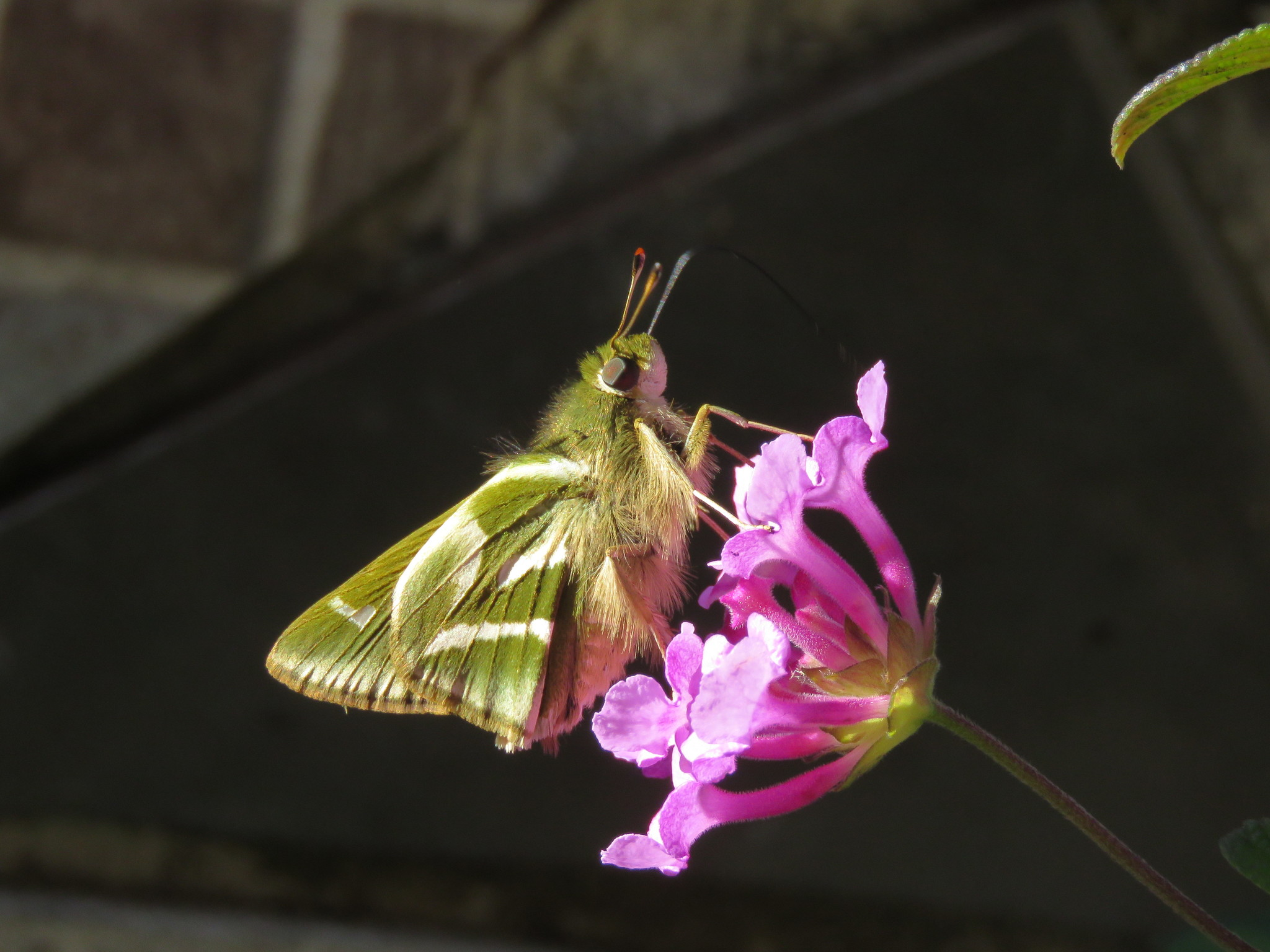
- Serdis venezuelae fractifascia

Scientific classification
- Kingdom: Animalia
- Phylum: Arthropoda
- Class: Insecta
- Order: Lepidoptera
- Family: Hesperiidae
- Tribe: Hesperiini
- Genus: Serdis; Mabille, 1904

= Serdis =

Genus of butterflies

Serdis is a genus of skipper butterflies in the family Hesperiidae.

One representative is Serdis fractifascia found in the tropical forests of Colombia.
