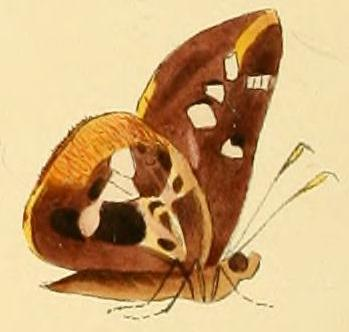

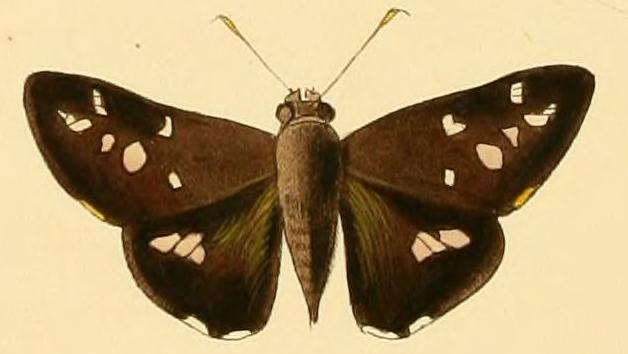

Scientific classification
- Kingdom: Animalia
- Phylum: Arthropoda
- Class: Insecta
- Order: Lepidoptera
- Family: Hesperiidae
- Genus: Thespieus
- Species: T. lutetia

Binomial name
- Thespieus lutetia (Hewitson, [1866])

Synonyms
- Hesperia lutetia Hewitson, [1866]; Thespieus chlorocephala Röber, 1925; Thespieus moneraspernatus Hayward, 1939

= Thespieus lutetia =

Species of butterfly

Thespieus lutetia is a butterfly in the family Hesperiidae. It is found in Brazil and Argentina.
