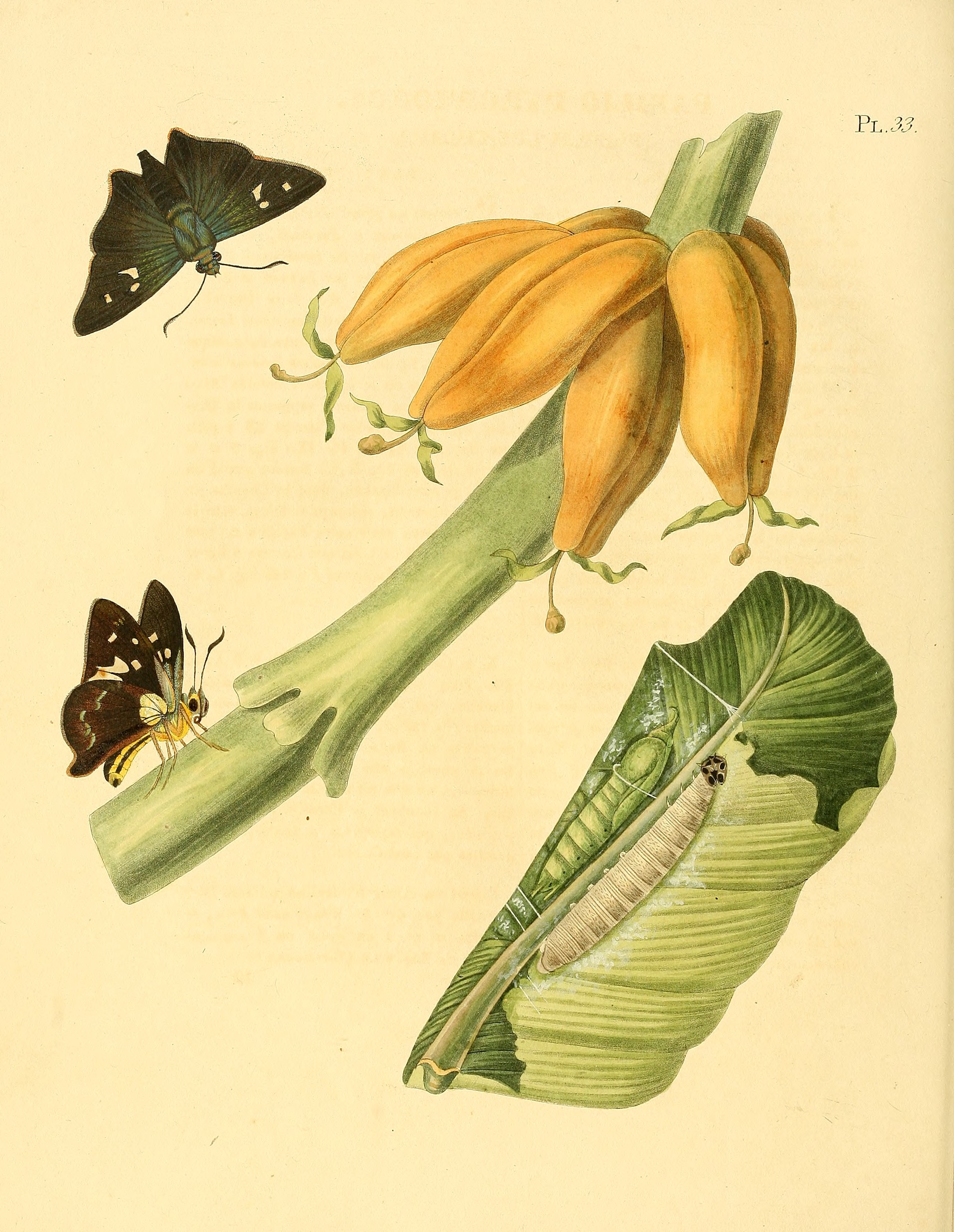
- Thracides phidon

Scientific classification
- Kingdom: Animalia
- Phylum: Arthropoda
- Class: Insecta
- Order: Lepidoptera
- Family: Hesperiidae
- Subfamily: Hesperiinae
- Tribe: Hesperiini
- Subtribe: Calpodina
- Genus: Thracides; Hübner, [1819]

Synonyms
- Sacrator Evans, 1955

= Thracides =

Genus of butterflies

Thracides is a Neotropical genus of grass skippers in the family Hesperiidae.

== Species ==
- Thracides arcalaus (Stoll, 1782)
- Thracides cilissa Hewitson, 1867 - Brazil
- Thracides cleanthes (Latreille, [1824])
  - T. c. cleanthes Brazil, Paraguay
  - T. c. binota Evans, 1955 - Venezuela
  - T. c. quarta Evans, 1955 - Peru
  - T. c. quinta Evans, 1955 - Brazil (Bahia)
  - T. c. telmela (Hewitson, 1866) - Brazil (Pará)
  - T. c. trebla Evans, 1955 - Bolivia
- Thracides joannisii Mabille, 1904 - Panama, Ecuador.
- Thracides nanea (Hewitson, 1867)
  - T. n. nanea - Brazil
  - T. n. nida Evans, 1955 - Colombia
- Thracides panimeron Druce, 1908 - Bolivia
- Thracides phidon (Cramer, [1779]) - Mexico, Panama to Brazil, Suriname, Trinidad
- Thracides polites (Godman & Salvin, 1879)
- Thracides sacrator Godman and Salvin, 1879
- Thracides thrasea (Hewitson, 1866) - Brazil (Amazonas)

=== Former species ===
- Thracides aletes Geyer, 1832 - transferred to Phanes aletes (Geyer, 1832)
- Thracides seron Godman, [1901] - transferred to Daron seron (Godman, [1901])
