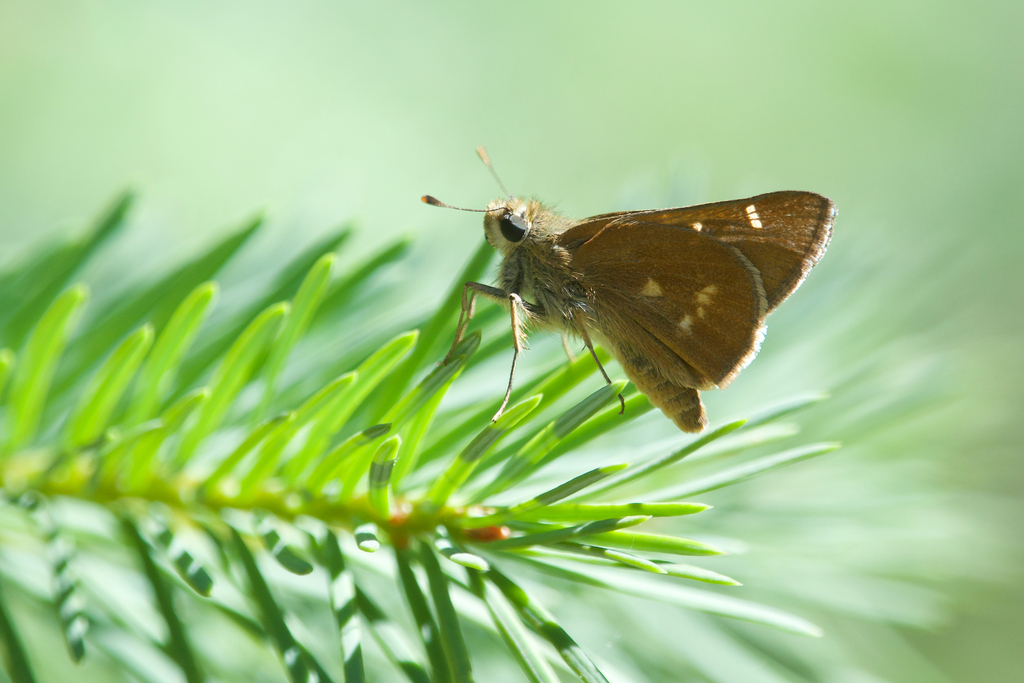

Conservation status
- Vulnerable (NatureServe)

Scientific classification
- Kingdom: Animalia
- Phylum: Arthropoda
- Class: Insecta
- Order: Lepidoptera
- Family: Hesperiidae
- Genus: Paratrytone
- Species: P. snowi

Binomial name
- Paratrytone snowi (W. H. Edwards, 1877)

Synonyms
- Hesperia Snowi Edwards, 1877; Ochlodes snowi (Evans, [1955])

= Paratrytone snowi =

Species of butterfly

Paratrytone snowi, or Snow's skipper, is a species of grass skipper in the butterfly family Hesperiidae.

== Description ==
The upperside of the wings are dark brown. The forewing has several clear spots, with males having a narrow black stigma. The underside is reddish brown with a black forewing base, in which the spots from the upperside are repeated below. The wingspan ranges from 1 1/8 to 1 3/8 inches (2.9 to 3.5 centimeters).
