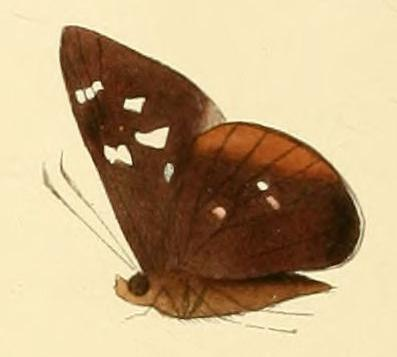
- Tisias caesena

Scientific classification
- Kingdom: Animalia
- Phylum: Arthropoda
- Class: Insecta
- Order: Lepidoptera
- Family: Hesperiidae
- Subfamily: Hesperiinae
- Tribe: Hesperiini
- Subtribe: Carystina
- Genus: Tisias; Godman in Godman & Salvin, [1901]

= Tisias (butterfly) =

Genus of butterflies

Tisias is a genus of skippers in the family Hesperiidae.

== Species ==
- Tisias caesena (Hewitson, 1867)
- Tisias carystoides Nicolay, 1980
- Tisias lesueur (Latreille, [1824])
- Tisias myna (Mabille, 1889)
