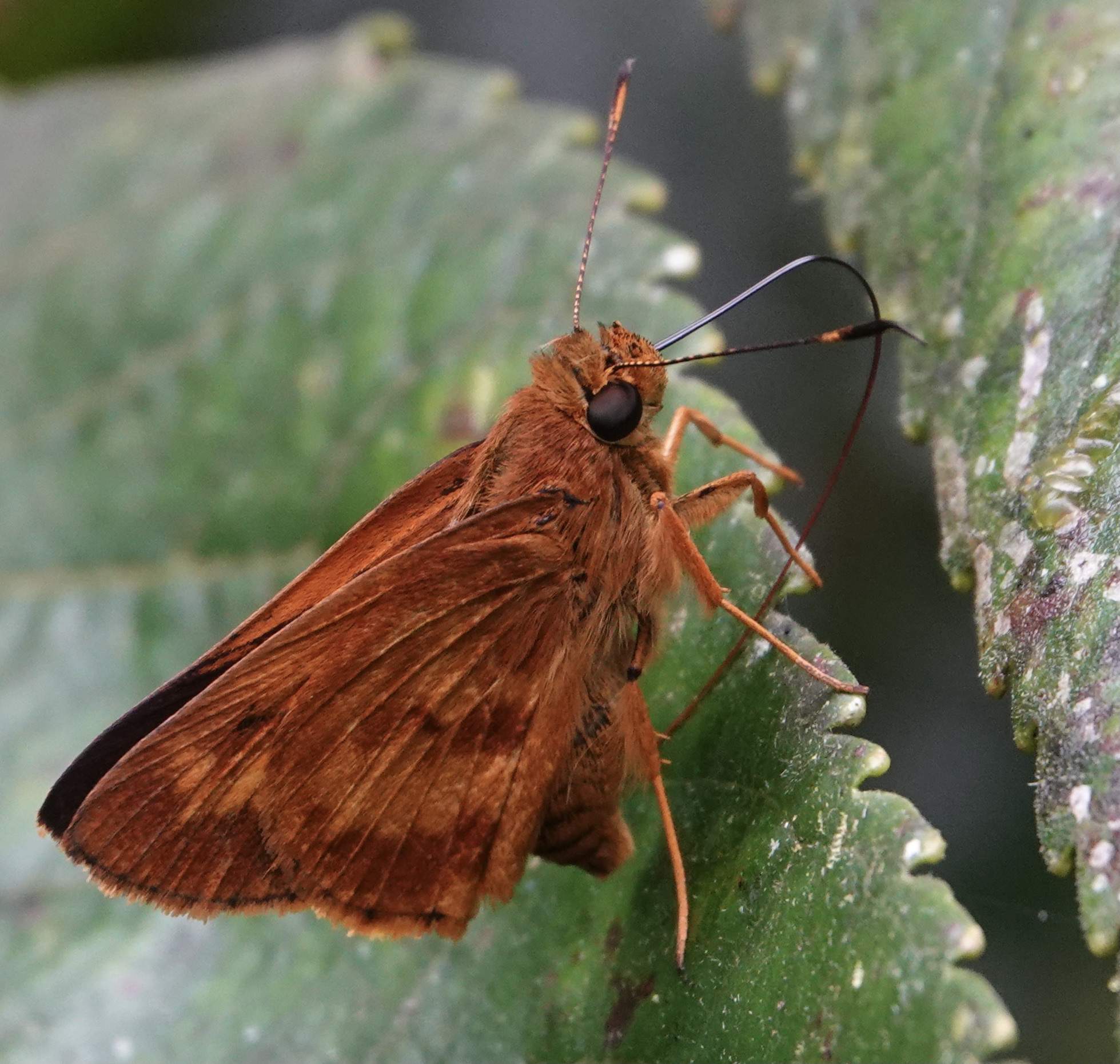
- Racta apella, Colombia

Scientific classification
- Kingdom: Animalia
- Phylum: Arthropoda
- Class: Insecta
- Order: Lepidoptera
- Family: Hesperiidae
- Subfamily: Hesperiinae
- Tribe: Hesperiini
- Genus: Racta; Evans, 1955

= Racta =

Genus of butterflies

Racta is a genus of grass skippers in the butterfly family Hesperiidae.

== Species ==
These species belong to the genus Racta:

- Racta apella Schaus, 1913
- Racta plasma Evans, 1955
- Racta racta Evans, 1955
