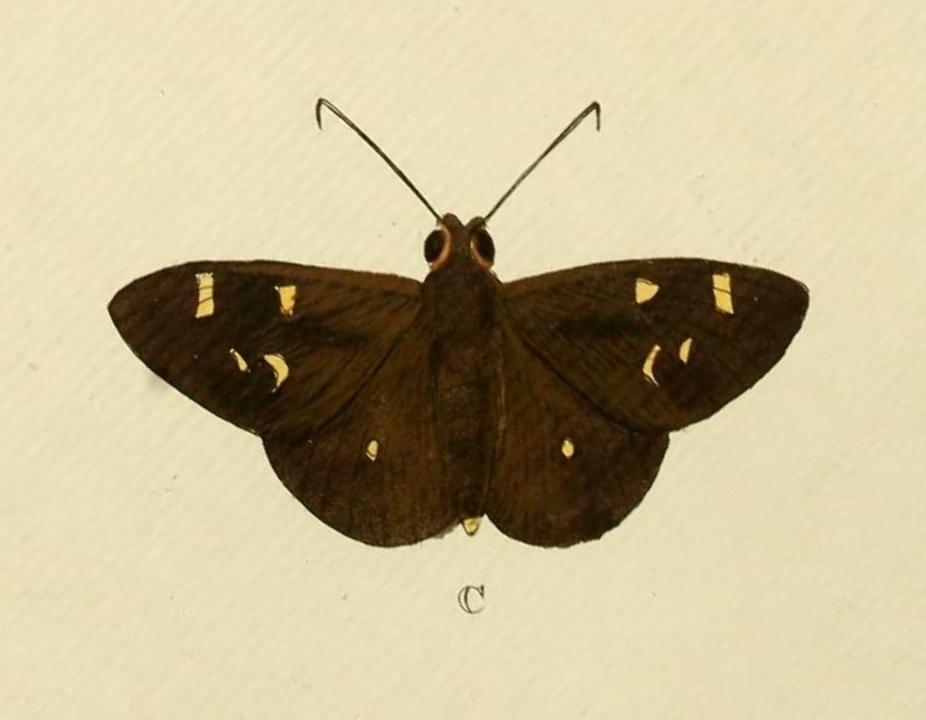
- Talides sergestus

Scientific classification
- Kingdom: Animalia
- Phylum: Arthropoda
- Class: Insecta
- Order: Lepidoptera
- Family: Hesperiidae
- Subtribe: Calpodina
- Genus: Talides; Hübner, [1819]

= Talides =

Genus of butterflies

Talides is a genus of skippers in the family Hesperiidae.

== Species ==
- Talides adjuncta
- Talides alternata
- Talides cantra
- Talides eudega
- Talides hispa
- Talides riosa
- Talides sergestus
- Talides sinois
- Talides sinon

=== Former species ===
- Talides striga Geyer, [1832] - transferred to Moeris striga (Geyer, [1832])
