= Aroma (skipper) =

Scientific classification
- Kingdom: Animalia
- Phylum: Arthropoda
- Class: Insecta
- Order: Lepidoptera
- Family: Hesperiidae
- Subtribe: Calpodina
- Genus: Aroma; Evans, 1955

Genus of butterflies

Aroma is a genus of skippers in the family Hesperiidae.

== Species ==
Recognised species in the genus Aroma include:

- Aroma aroma (Hewitson, 1867)
