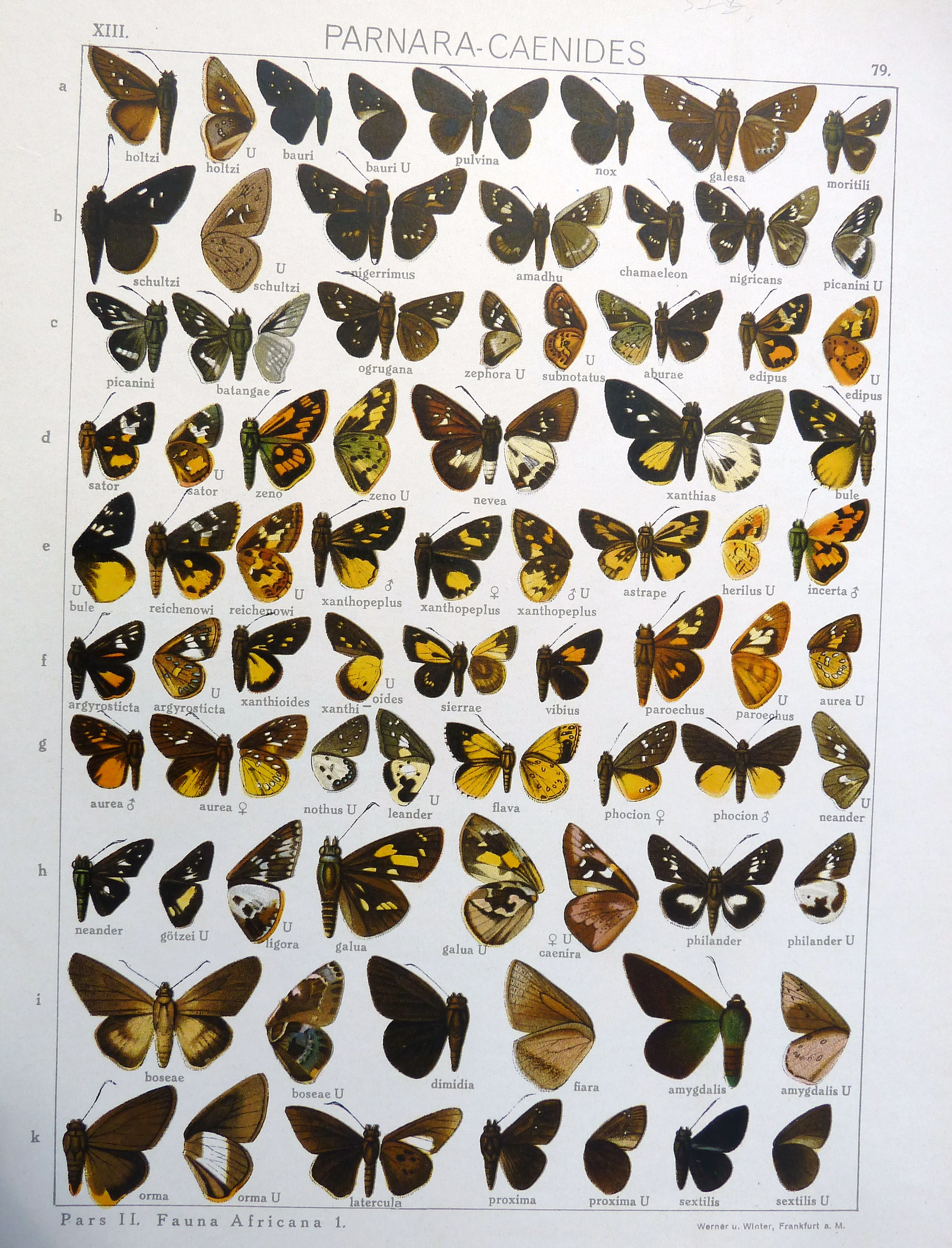

Scientific classification
- Kingdom: Animalia
- Phylum: Arthropoda
- Clade: Pancrustacea
- Class: Insecta
- Order: Lepidoptera
- Family: Hesperiidae
- Genus: Argemma
- Species: A. argyrosticta

Binomial name
- Argemma argyrosticta (Plötz, 1879)

Synonyms
- List: Apaustus argyrosticta Plötz, 1879; Apaustus argyrospila Plötz, 1884; Ceratrichia guineensis ab. limbana Strand, 1913; Ceratrichia argyrosticta (Plötz, 1879)

= Argemma argyrosticta =

Pearl-spotted forest sylph

Species of butterfly

Argemma argyrosticta, the pearl-spotted forest sylph, is a species of butterfly in the family Hesperiidae. It is found in Ivory Coast, Ghana, Nigeria, Cameroon, the Republic of the Congo, the Central African Republic, the Democratic Republic of the Congo and Uganda. The habitat consists of forests.

== Subspecies ==
- Argemma argyrosticta argyrosticta - Ivory Coast, Ghana, Nigeria, Cameroon, Congo, Central African Republic
- Argemma argyrosticta enta Evans, 1947 - eastern Democratic Republic of the Congo, Uganda

Torben Larsen developed a species numbering system for his 2005 publication Butterflies of West Africa. The nominate subspecies is #1307. The 'Larsen' numbers have since been used with permission in A Sharp Eye on Butterflies of Ghana.
