= Notamblyscirtes =

Scientific classification
- Kingdom: Animalia
- Phylum: Arthropoda
- Class: Insecta
- Order: Lepidoptera
- Family: Hesperiidae
- Genus: Notamblyscirtes; Scott, 2006
- Species: N. simius

Binomial name
- Notamblyscirtes simius (W. H. Edwards, 1881)

Genus of butterflies

Notamblyscirtes is a genus of grass skippers in the butterfly family Hesperiidae. There is one described species is Notamblyscirtes simius.
