= Lindra (skipper) =

Scientific classification
- Kingdom: Animalia
- Phylum: Arthropoda
- Class: Insecta
- Order: Lepidoptera
- Family: Hesperiidae
- Subtribe: Hesperiina
- Genus: Lindra; Evans, 1955

Genus of butterflies

Lindra is a genus of skippers in the family Hesperiidae.

== Species ==
Recognised species in the genus Lindra include:

- Lindra simulius (Druce, 1876)
