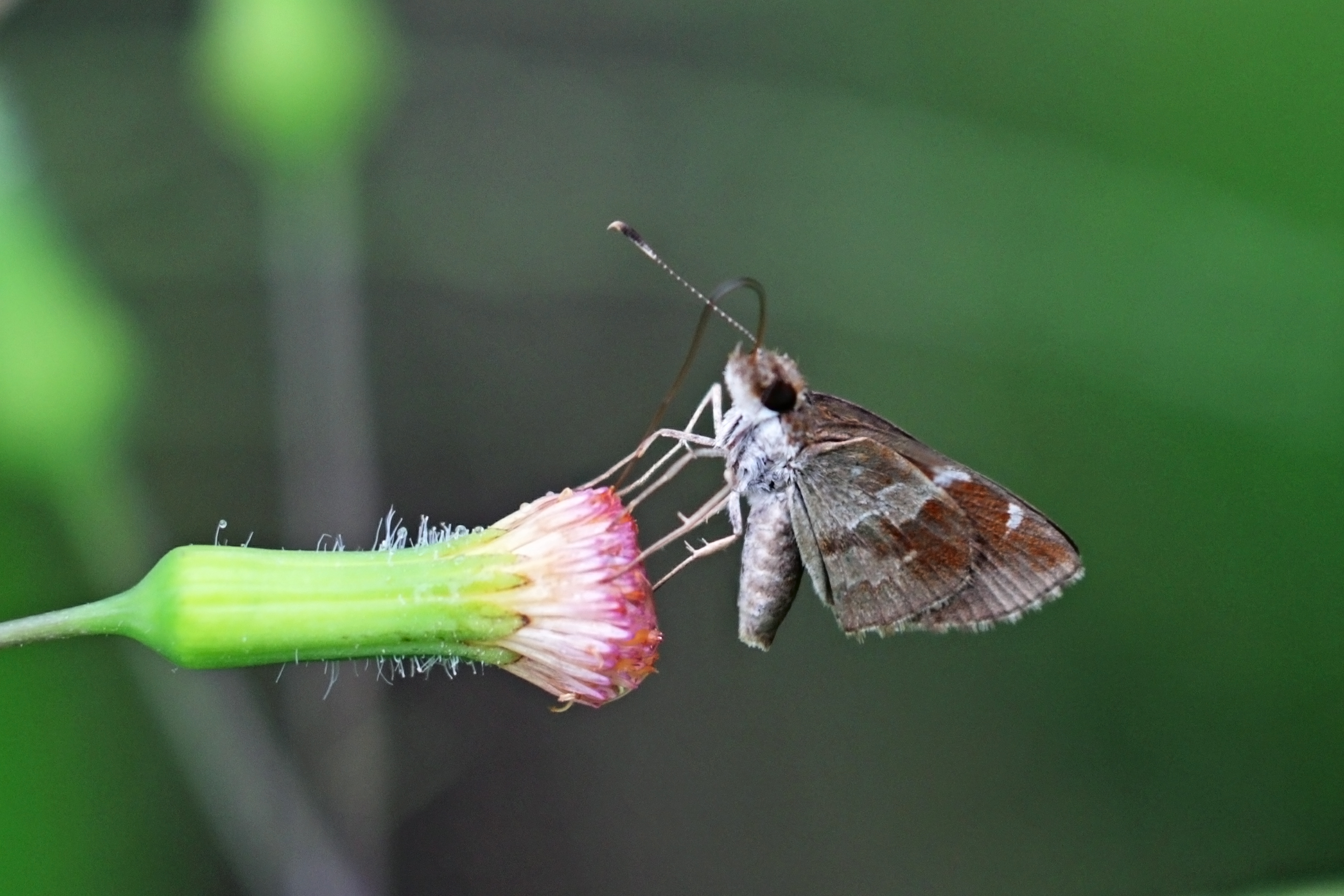
- Telata skipper (Monca telata), Panama

Scientific classification
- Kingdom: Animalia
- Phylum: Arthropoda
- Class: Insecta
- Order: Lepidoptera
- Family: Hesperiidae
- Subtribe: Moncina
- Genus: Monca; Evans, [1955]

= Monca =

Genus of butterflies

Monca is a genus of skipper butterflies in the family Hesperiidae.

== Species ==
Recognised species in the genus Monca include:

- Monca crispinus (Plötz, 1882)
