= Igapophilus =

Scientific classification
- Kingdom: Animalia
- Phylum: Arthropoda
- Class: Insecta
- Order: Lepidoptera
- Family: Hesperiidae
- Genus: Igapophilus; Mielke, 1979
- Species: I. rufus

Binomial name
- Igapophilus rufus Mielke, 1979

Genus of butterflies

Igapophilus is a genus of skipper butterflies in the family Hesperiidae. It has one species Igapophilus rufus.
