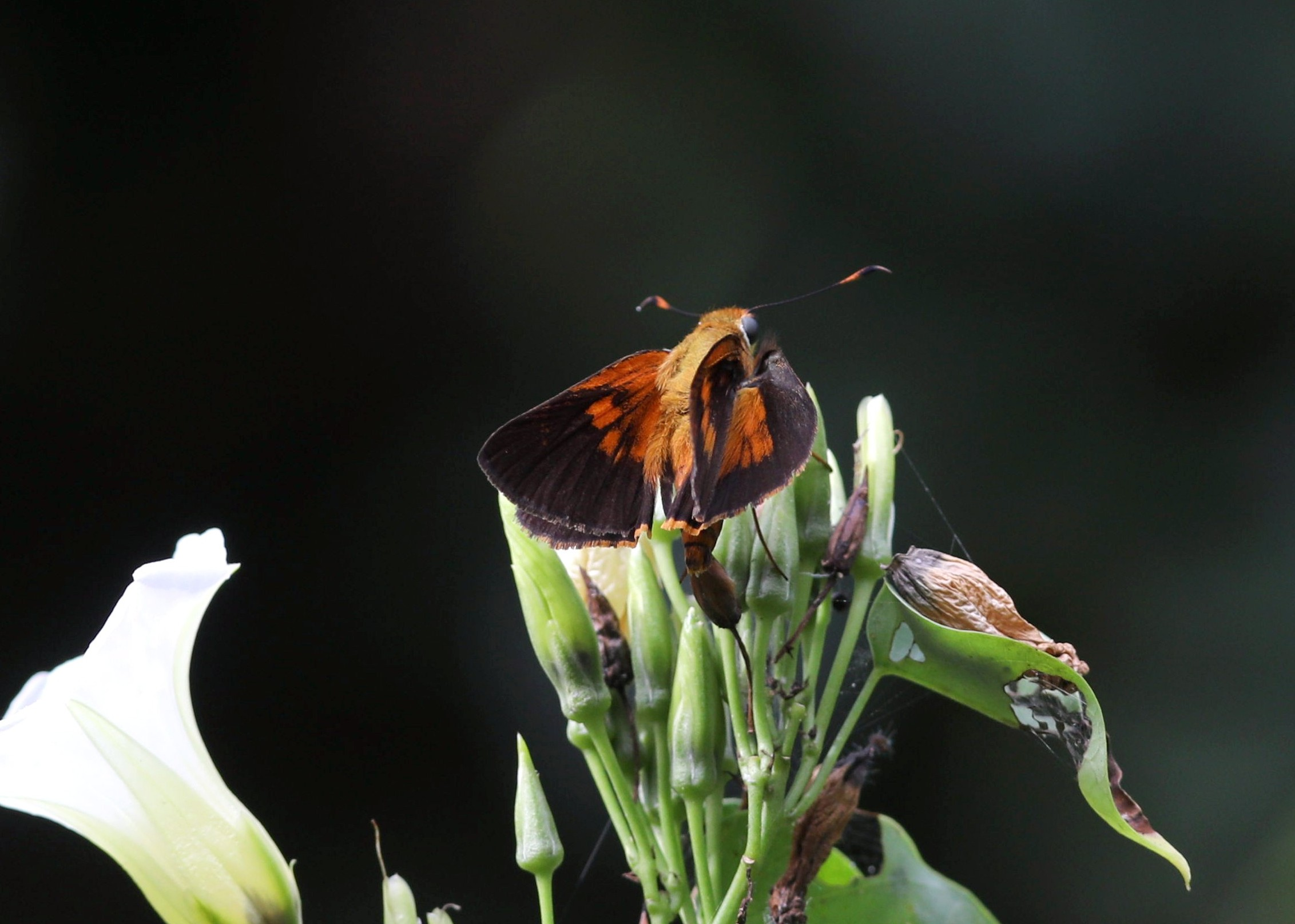
- Choranthus orientis orientis in Cuba

Scientific classification
- Kingdom: Animalia
- Phylum: Arthropoda
- Class: Insecta
- Order: Lepidoptera
- Family: Hesperiidae
- Genus: Choranthus
- Species: C. orientis

Binomial name
- Choranthus orientis Skinner, 1920

Synonyms
- Pyrrhocalles antiqua (Herrich-Schäffer, 1863)

= Choranthus orientis =

Cuban skipper

Species of butterfly native to Cuba and the Bahamas

Choranthus orientis, the Cuban skipper, is a species of skipper in the family Hesperiidae. It is found in the Cuba and The Bahamas.

== Taxonomy ==
Originally a subspecies of the now inactive taxon, Pyrrhocalles antiqua, C. orientis was revised in 2022 to become a species-level taxon.

Two subspecies are recognized:

- "Choranthus orientis orientis - Cuba"
- "Choranthus orientis eleutherae - Bahamas"
