= Cobalopsis =

Scientific classification
- Kingdom: Animalia
- Phylum: Arthropoda
- Clade: Pancrustacea
- Class: Insecta
- Order: Lepidoptera
- Family: Hesperiidae
- Subtribe: Moncina
- Genus: Cobalopsis; Godman, 1900 in Godman & Salvin

Genus of butterflies

Cobalopsis is a genus of skippers in the family Hesperiidae.

== Species ==
- Cobalopsis autumna Plötz, 1883
- Cobalopsis catocala Herrich-Schäffer, 1869
- Cobalopsis cocalus (Hayward, 1939)
- Cobalopsis dagon Evans, W.H., [1955]
- Cobalopsis dictys (Godman, 1900)
- Cobalopsis dorpa de Jong, 1983
- Cobalopsis monotona Mielke, 1989
- Cobalopsis nero Herrich-Schäffer, 1869
- Cobalopsis obscurior Hayward, 1934
- Cobalopsis similis Mielke, 1989
- Cobalopsis tanna de Jong, 1983
- Cobalopsis valerius (Möschler, 1879)
- Cobalopsis zetus (Bell, 1942)

=== Former species ===
- Cobalopsis brema Bell, 1959 - synonymized with Eutus rastaca (Schaus, 1902)
- Cobalopsis dyscritus (Mabille, 1891) - synonymized with Cobalopsis autumna (Mabille, 1891)
- Cobalopsis edda (Mabille, 1891) - synonymized with Cobalopsis nero (Mabille, 1891)
- Cobalopsis elegans Hayward, 1940 - synonymized with Cobalopsis valerius
- Cobalopsis hazarma (Hewitson, 1877) - transferred to Haza hazarma (Hewitson, 1877)
- Cobalopsis latonia Schaus, 1913 - transferred to Papias latonia (Schaus, 1913)
- Cobalopsis miaba Hayward, 1940 - synonymized with Cobalopsis valerius
- Cobalopsis potaro (Williams & Bell, 1931) - synonymized with Cobalopsis valerius
- Cobalopsis venias Bell, 1942 - transferred to Lerema venias (Bell, 1942)
- Cobalopsis vorgia (Schaus, 1902) - transferred to Rectava vorgia (Schaus, 1902)
