= Propapias =

Scientific classification
- Kingdom: Animalia
- Phylum: Arthropoda
- Class: Insecta
- Order: Lepidoptera
- Family: Hesperiidae
- Genus: Propapias; Mielke, 1992
- Species: P. sipariana

Binomial name
- Propapias sipariana (Kaye, 1925)

Genus of butterflies

Propapias is a genus of skipper butterflies in the family Hesperiidae. It has one species Propapias sipariana.
