= Methion =

Scientific classification
- Kingdom: Animalia
- Phylum: Arthropoda
- Class: Insecta
- Order: Lepidoptera
- Family: Hesperiidae
- Genus: Methion; Godman, 1900
- Species: M. melas

Binomial name
- Methion melas Godman, 1900

Genus of butterflies

Methion is a monotypic genus of skipper butterflies in the family Hesperiidae. It has one species, Methion melas.
