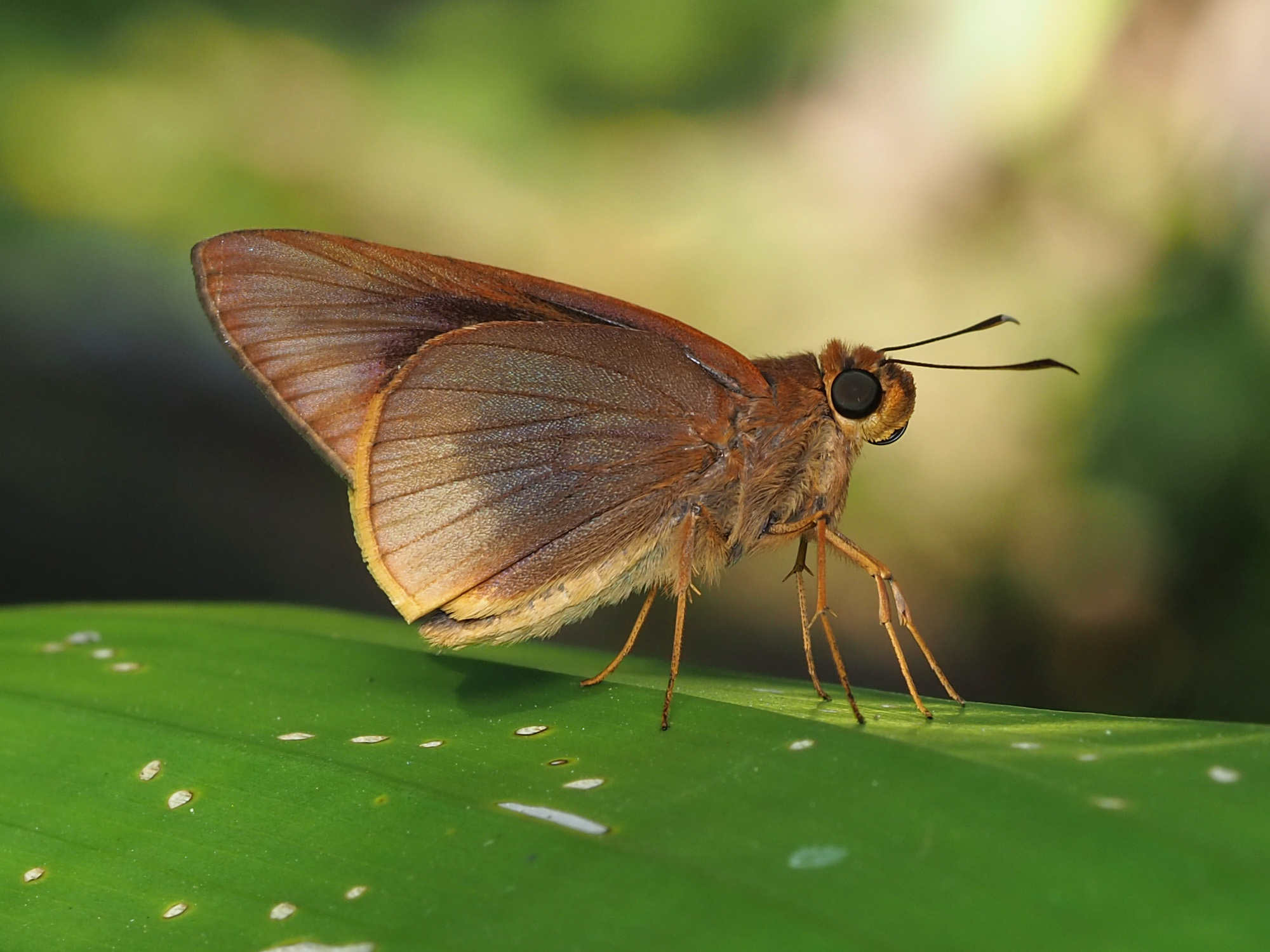
- Yellow-washed Ruby-eye (Tromba xanthura) in Belize (2020)

Scientific classification
- Kingdom: Animalia
- Phylum: Arthropoda
- Clade: Pancrustacea
- Class: Insecta
- Order: Lepidoptera
- Family: Hesperiidae
- Subtribe: Carystina
- Genus: Tromba; Evans, 1955

= Tromba (skipper) =

Genus of butterflies

Tromba is a genus of skippers in the family Hesperiidae.

== Species ==
Recognised species in the genus Tromba include:

- Tromba tromba Evans, 1955
