= Cobalopsis valerius =

Scientific classification
- Kingdom: Animalia
- Phylum: Arthropoda
- Class: Insecta
- Order: Lepidoptera
- Family: Hesperiidae
- Genus: Cobalopsis
- Species: C. valerius

Binomial name
- Cobalopsis valerius (Möschler, 1879)

Synonyms
- List: Megistias miaba Schaus, 1902; Euroto potaro Williams & Bell, 1931; Megistias vegrandis Hayward, 1934; Papias elegans Hayward, 1940; Cobalopsis miaba (Schaus, 1902)

Species of butterfly

Cobalopsis valerius, the miaba skipper, is a species of skippers in the family Hesperiidae. It is found from Costa Rica to southern Brazil and Paraguay.
