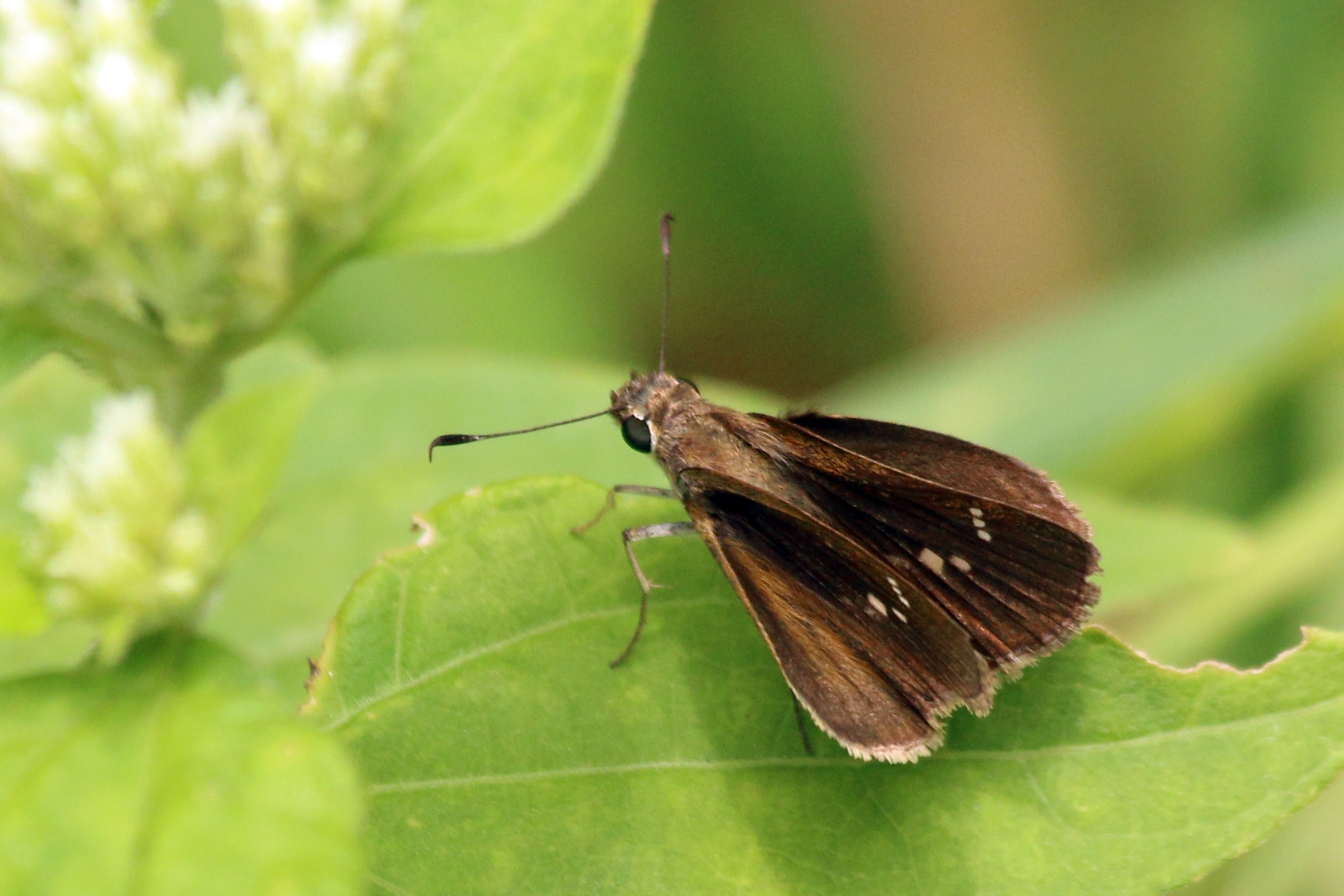
- Cane skipper, (N. nyctelius), Tobago

Scientific classification
- Kingdom: Animalia
- Phylum: Arthropoda
- Class: Insecta
- Order: Lepidoptera
- Family: Hesperiidae
- Tribe: Hesperiini
- Genus: Nyctelius; Guérin-Méneville, 1827

= Nyctelius =

Genus of butterflies

Nyctelius is a genus of skippers in the family Hesperiidae.
