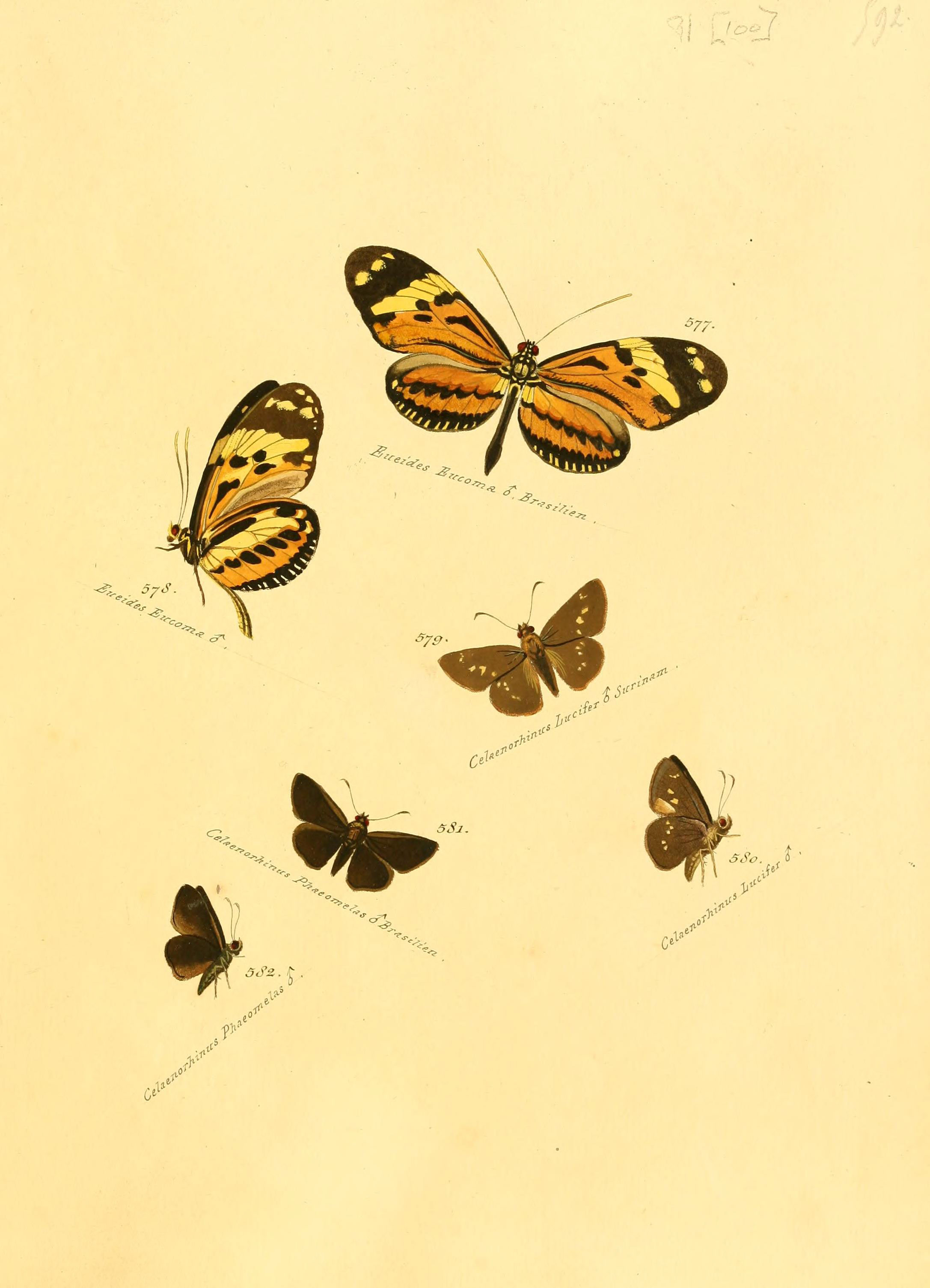
- Papias phaeomelas in Sammlung exotischer Schmetterlinge

Scientific classification
- Kingdom: Animalia
- Phylum: Arthropoda
- Class: Insecta
- Order: Lepidoptera
- Family: Hesperiidae
- Subtribe: Moncina
- Genus: Papias; Godman in Godman & Salvin, [1900]

Synonyms
- Mnasilus Godman, 1900

= Papias (butterfly) =

Genus of butterflies

Papias is a Neotropical genus of grass skipper butterflies in the family Hesperiidae.

== Species ==
The following species are recognised in the genus Papias:

- Papias allubita (Butler, 1877)
- Papias amyrna (Mabille, 1891)
- Papias cascatona Mielke, 1992 - Brazil
- Papias dictys Godman, [1900] - Mexico, Guatemala, Costa Rica, Panama
- Papias integra (Mabille, 1891)
- Papias phaeomelas (Hübner, [1831]) - Mexico to Brazil, Trinidad, French Guiana
- Papias phainis Godman, [1900] - Mexico, Guatemala, Costa Rica, Brazil, Paraguay, Ecuador, Guyana
- Papias projectus Bell, 1942 - Ecuador
- Papias quigua Evans, 1955 - Venezuela
- Papias subcostulata (Herrich-Schäffer, 1870) - Brazil, Surinam, Honduras, Colombia, Bolivia
- Papias tristissimus Schaus, 1902 - Peru
