= Tigasis =

Scientific classification
- Kingdom: Animalia
- Phylum: Arthropoda
- Class: Insecta
- Order: Lepidoptera
- Family: Hesperiidae
- Subtribe: Moncina
- Genus: Tigasis; Godman, 1900 (in Godman & Salvin, [1900])

Synonyms
- Arita Evans, 1955

Genus of butterflies

Tigasis is a Neotropical genus of grass skippers in the family Hesperiidae.

== Species ==
Recognised species include:

- Tigasis arita (Schaus, 1902)
- Tigasis colomus (E. Bell, 1941)
- Tigasis corope (Herrich-Schäffer, 1869)
- Tigasis perloides (Plötz, 1882)
- Tigasis physcoa (Hewitson, 1868)
- Tigasis polistion (Schaus, 1902)
- Tigasis serra (Hewitson, 1868)
- Tigasis wellingi (Evans, 1955)
- Tigasis zalates Godman, [1900]
