= Artines =

Scientific classification
- Kingdom: Animalia
- Phylum: Arthropoda
- Class: Insecta
- Order: Lepidoptera
- Family: Hesperiidae
- Subtribe: Moncina
- Genus: Artines; Godman, 1901

Genus of butterflies

Artines is a genus of skippers in the family Hesperiidae.

== Species ==
Recognised species in the genus Artines include:

- Artines aepitus (Geyer, 1832)
- Artines aquilina (Plötz, 1883)
- Artines rica Steinhauser & Austin, 1993

=== Former species ===
- Artines melitaea Draudt, 1923 - transferred to Lucida melitaea (Draudt, 1923)
