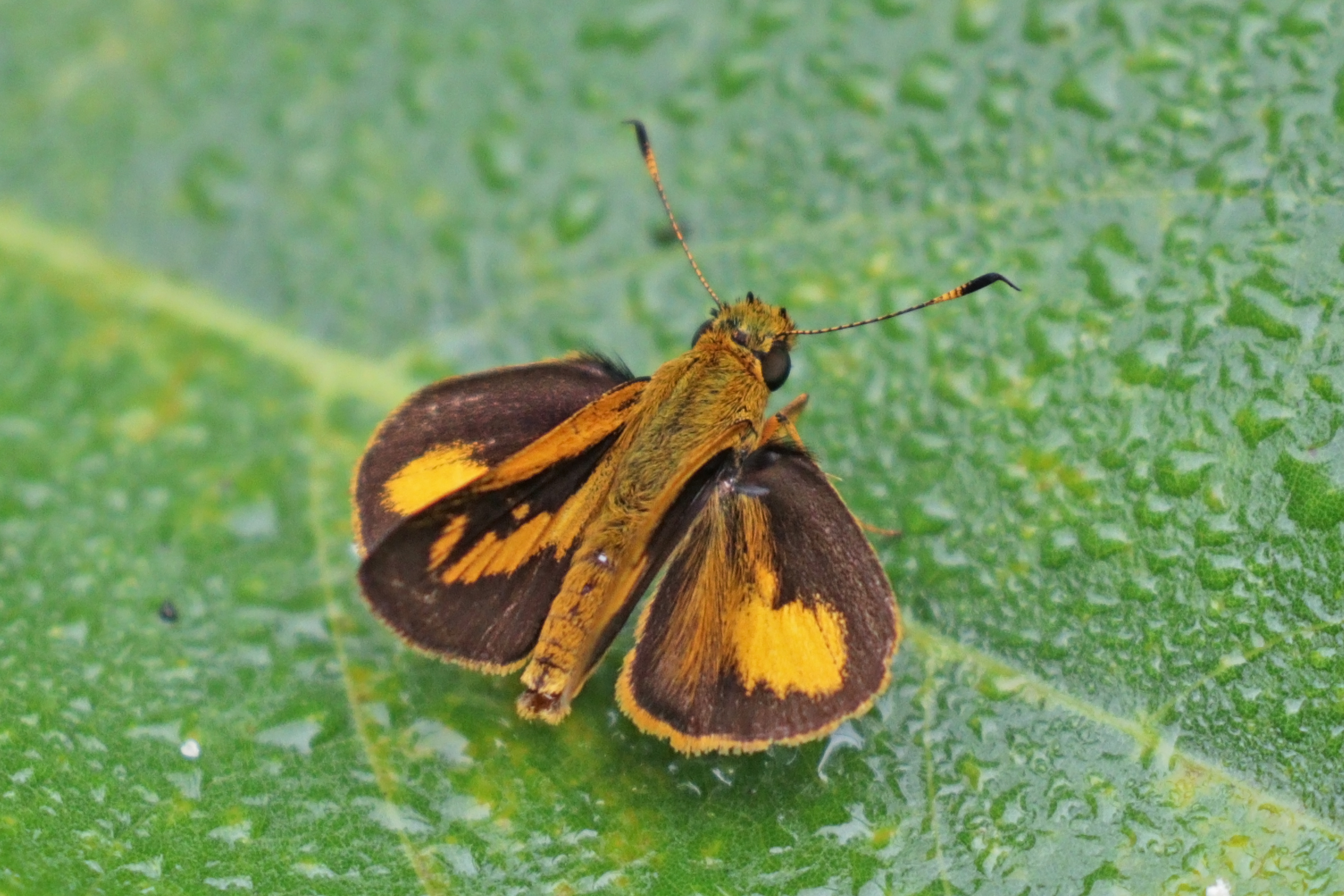
- Zariaspes mys, Costa Rica

Scientific classification
- Kingdom: Animalia
- Phylum: Arthropoda
- Class: Insecta
- Order: Lepidoptera
- Family: Hesperiidae
- Subtribe: Moncina
- Genus: Zariaspes; Godman, 1900

Synonyms
- Aella Mabille, 1904

= Zariaspes =

Genus of butterflies

Zariaspes is a Neotropical genus of grass skipper butterflies in the family Hesperiidae.

== Species ==
The following species are recognised in the genus Mnestheus:

- Zariaspes aurora Bell, 1942
- Zariaspes mys (Hübner, [1808]) mys skipper – east Mexico to south Brazil and Paraguay
- Zariaspes mythecus Godman, 1900 Godman's skipper – west Mexico
- BOLD:ADA7943 (Zariaspes sp.)
