= Mucia =

Scientific classification
- Kingdom: Animalia
- Phylum: Arthropoda
- Class: Insecta
- Order: Lepidoptera
- Family: Hesperiidae
- Subtribe: Moncina
- Genus: Mucia; Godman, 1900

Genus of butterflies

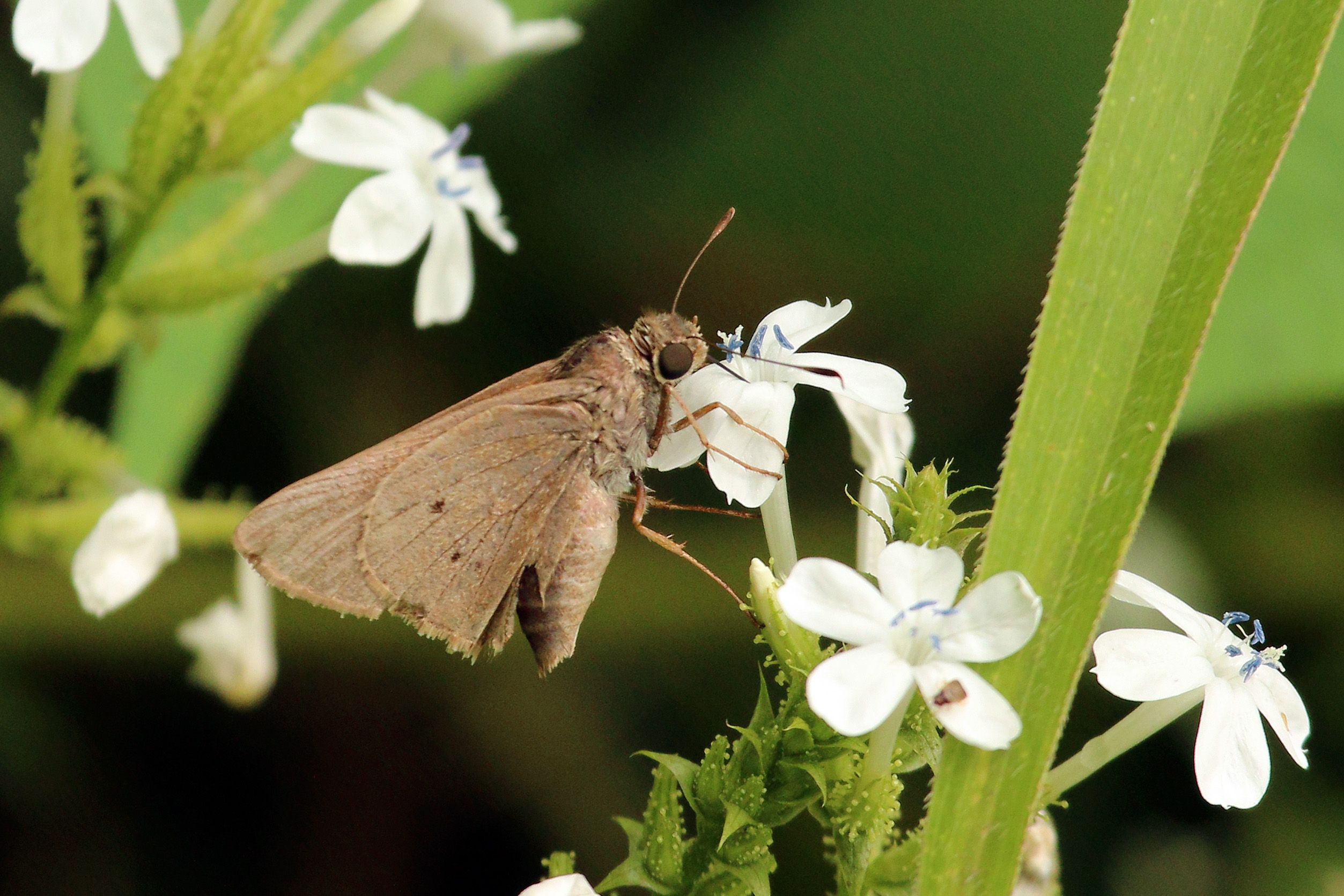
Black-dotted skipper (Mucia zygia)

Mucia is a genus of skipper butterflies in the family Hesperiidae.
