= Onophas =

Scientific classification
- Kingdom: Animalia
- Phylum: Arthropoda
- Class: Insecta
- Order: Lepidoptera
- Family: Hesperiidae
- Subtribe: Moncina
- Genus: Onophas; Godman, 1900

Genus of butterflies

Onophas is a genus of skippers in the family Hesperiidae.
