= Mnasitheus =

Scientific classification
- Kingdom: Animalia
- Phylum: Arthropoda
- Class: Insecta
- Order: Lepidoptera
- Family: Hesperiidae
- Subtribe: Moncina
- Genus: Mnasitheus; Godman, 1900

Synonyms
- Sucova Evans, 1955

Genus of butterflies

Mnasitheus is a genus of skippers in the family Hesperiidae.
