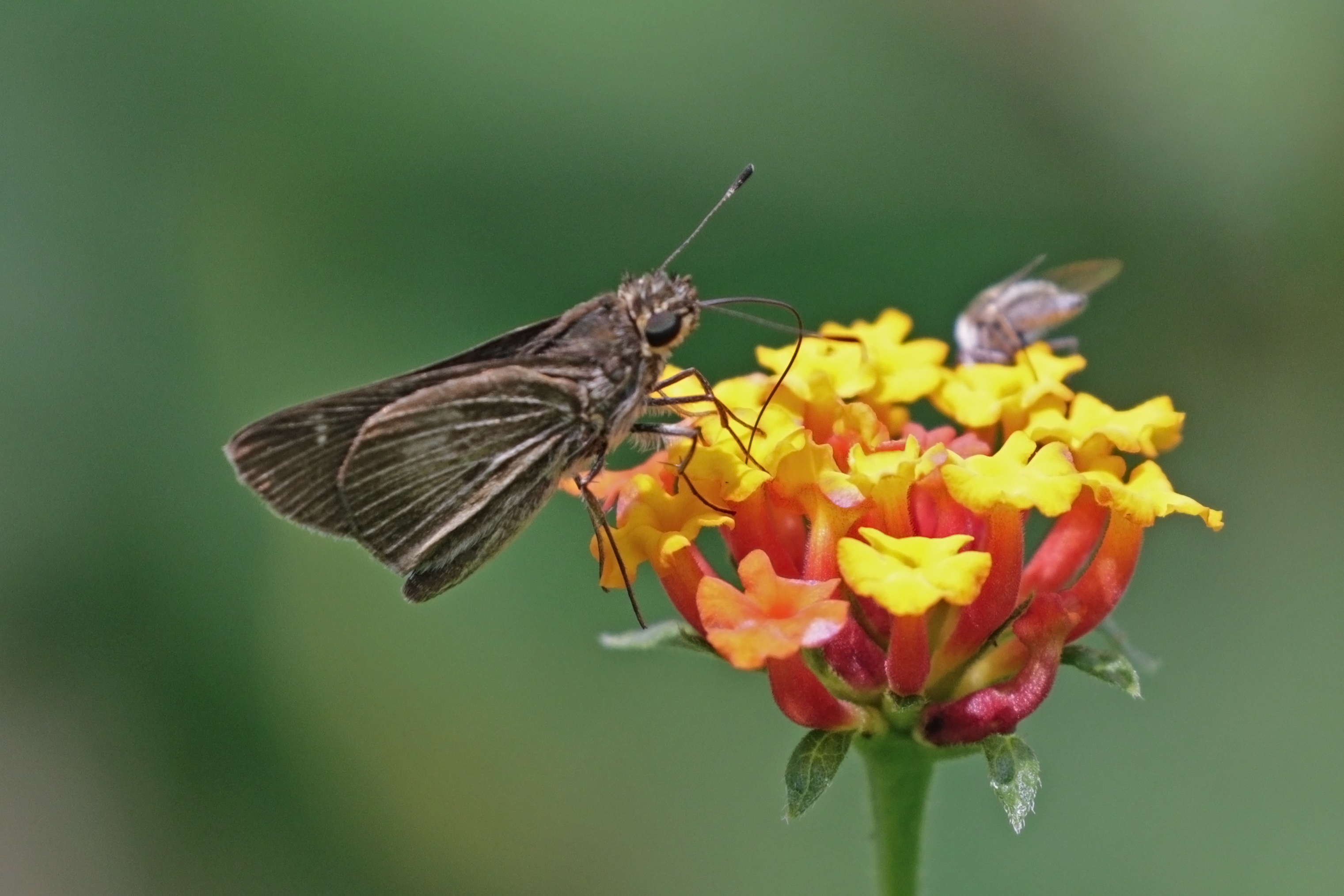
- Inca skipper (V. inca) in Panama

Scientific classification
- Kingdom: Animalia
- Phylum: Arthropoda
- Class: Insecta
- Order: Lepidoptera
- Family: Hesperiidae
- Subtribe: Moncina
- Genus: Vehilius; Godman, 1900

= Vehilius =

Genus of butterflies

Vehilius is a genus of skippers in the family Hesperiidae.

== Species ==
Recognised species include:

- Vehilius carasta Schaus, 1902
- Vehilius clavicula (Plötz, 1884)
- Vehilius inca (Scudder, 1872) - Inca skipper
- Vehilius labdacus (Godman, 1900)
- Vehilius limae (Lindsey, 1925)
- Vehilius putus Bell, 1941
- Vehilius seriatus (Mabille, 1891)
- Vehilius stictomenes (Butler, 1877)
- Vehilius vetula (Mabille, 1878)
- Vehilius warreni (Weeks, 1901)
