= Phanes (butterfly) =

Scientific classification
- Kingdom: Animalia
- Phylum: Arthropoda
- Class: Insecta
- Order: Lepidoptera
- Family: Hesperiidae
- Subtribe: Moncina
- Genus: Phanes; Godman, [1901]

Genus of butterflies

Phanes is a genus of skippers in the family Hesperiidae.

== Species ==
Recognised species in the genus Phanes include:

- Phanes aletes (Geyer, 1832)

=== Former species ===
- Phanes tavola (Schaus, 1902) - transferred to Tava tavola (Schaus, 1902)
