= Eutocus =

Scientific classification
- Kingdom: Animalia
- Phylum: Arthropoda
- Class: Insecta
- Order: Lepidoptera
- Family: Hesperiidae
- Subtribe: Moncina
- Genus: Eutocus; Godman, 1901

Genus of butterflies

Eutocus is a genus of skippers in the family Hesperiidae.

== Species ==
Recognised species in the genus Eutocus include:

- Eutocus facilis (Plotz, 1884)
- Eutocus quichua Lindsey, 1925
- Eutocus vetulus (Mabille, [1883])
