= Hypoleria =

- Hypoleria chrysodonia

Scientific classification
- Domain: Eukaryota
- Kingdom: Animalia
- Phylum: Arthropoda
- Class: Insecta
- Order: Lepidoptera
- Family: Nymphalidae
- Tribe: Ithomiini
- Genus: Hypoleria; Godman & Salvin, [1879]

Species
- See text

Synonyms
- Pigritia d'Almeida, 1922 (preocc. Pigritia Clemens, 1860); Pigritina Hedicke, 1923; Heringia d'Almeida, 1924

Genus of brush-footed butterflies

Hypoleria is a genus of clearwing (ithomiine) butterflies, named by Frederick DuCane Godman and Osbert Salvin in 1879. They are in the brush-footed butterfly family, Nymphalidae.

== Species ==
Arranged alphabetically:

- Hypoleria adasa (Hewitson, [1855])
- Hypoleria alema (Hewitson, [1857])
- Hypoleria aureliana (Bates, 1862)
- Hypoleria jaruensis d'Almeida, 1951
- Hypoleria lavinia (Hewitson, [1855])
- Hypoleria ocalea (Doubleday & Hewitson, 1847)
- Hypoleria sarepta (Hewitson, [1852])
- Hypoleria xenophis Haensch, 1909
