= Parphorus =

Scientific classification
- Kingdom: Animalia
- Phylum: Arthropoda
- Class: Insecta
- Order: Lepidoptera
- Family: Hesperiidae
- Subtribe: Moncina
- Genus: Parphorus; Godman, 1900

Genus of butterflies

Parphorus is a genus of skippers in the family Hesperiidae.

== Species ==
Recognised species in the genus Parphorus include:

- Parphorus decora Dyar, 1914
- Parphorus felta Evans, [1955]
- Parphorus storax (Draudt, 1923)

=== Former species ===
- Parphorus auristriga Bell, 1959 - transferred to Rigga auristriga (Bell, 1959)
- Parphorus hesia (Hewitson, 1870) - transferred to Rigga hesia (Hewitson, 1870)
- Parphorus ira (Butler, 1870) - transferred to Rigga ira (Butler, 1870)
- Parphorus oeagrus (Godman, [1900]) - transferred to Rigga oeagrus (Godman, [1900])
- Parphorus paramus (Bell, 1947) - transferred to Rigga paramus (Bell, 1947)
- Parphorus sapala (Godman, [1900]) - transferred to Rigga sapala (Godman, [1900])
