= Saturnus =

Saturnus may refer to:

- Saturn (mythology), a Roman god whose Latin name was Saturnus
- Saturnus (band), a band from Denmark
- Saturnus (butterfly), a genus of butterflies in the grass skipper family
- Saturn, a planet in the Solar System
