= Paracarystus =

Scientific classification
- Kingdom: Animalia
- Phylum: Arthropoda
- Class: Insecta
- Order: Lepidoptera
- Family: Hesperiidae
- Subtribe: Moncina
- Genus: Paracarystus; Godman, 1900

Genus of butterflies

Paracarystus is a genus of skippers in the family Hesperiidae.

== Species ==
The following species are recognised in the genus Paracarystus:

- Paracarystus evansi Hayward, 1938
- Paracarystus hypargyra Herrich-Schäffer, [1869]
- Paracarystus menestries (Latreille, [1824])
- Paracarystus ranka (Evans, 1955)
