= Dion (skipper) =

Scientific classification
- Kingdom: Animalia
- Phylum: Arthropoda
- Class: Insecta
- Order: Lepidoptera
- Family: Hesperiidae
- Subtribe: Moncina
- Genus: Dion; Godman, 1901

Genus of butterflies

Dion is a genus of skippers in the family Hesperiidae.

== Species ==
Recognised species in the genus Dion include:

- Dion agassus (Mabille, 1891)
- Dion carmenta (Hewitson, 1870)
- Dion gemmatus (Butler, 1872)
- Dion iccius (Evans, 1955)
- Dion meda (Hewitson, 1877)
- Dion uza (Hewitson, 1877)
