= Epirus (disambiguation) =

Epirus is a historical and geographical region of the southwestern Balkans, straddling modern Greece and Albania.

The name Epirus, from the Greek "Ήπειρος" meaning "continent" may also refer to:

== Geographical ==
- Epirus (region), one of the thirteen regions (administrative divisions) of Greece
- Northern Epirus, a Greek political term used to refer to parts of southern Albania

== Historical ==
- Epirus (ancient state), an ancient Greek state (330–167 BC)
- Epirus Vetus ("Old Epirus", 146 BC–395 AD), province of the Roman Empire
- Epirus Nova ("New Epirus"), a province of the Roman Empire
- Despotate of Epirus (1205–1479), one of the successor states of the Byzantine Empire
- Autonomous Republic of Northern Epirus, a short lived entity (1914) proclaimed by the pro-Greek party in the south of the Principality of Albania

== People ==
- Epirus (mythology) from Greek mythology, daughter of Echion and Agave

== Technology ==
- Epirus Leonidas, an anti-drone weapon

== See also ==
- Eprius, a genus of butterflies
