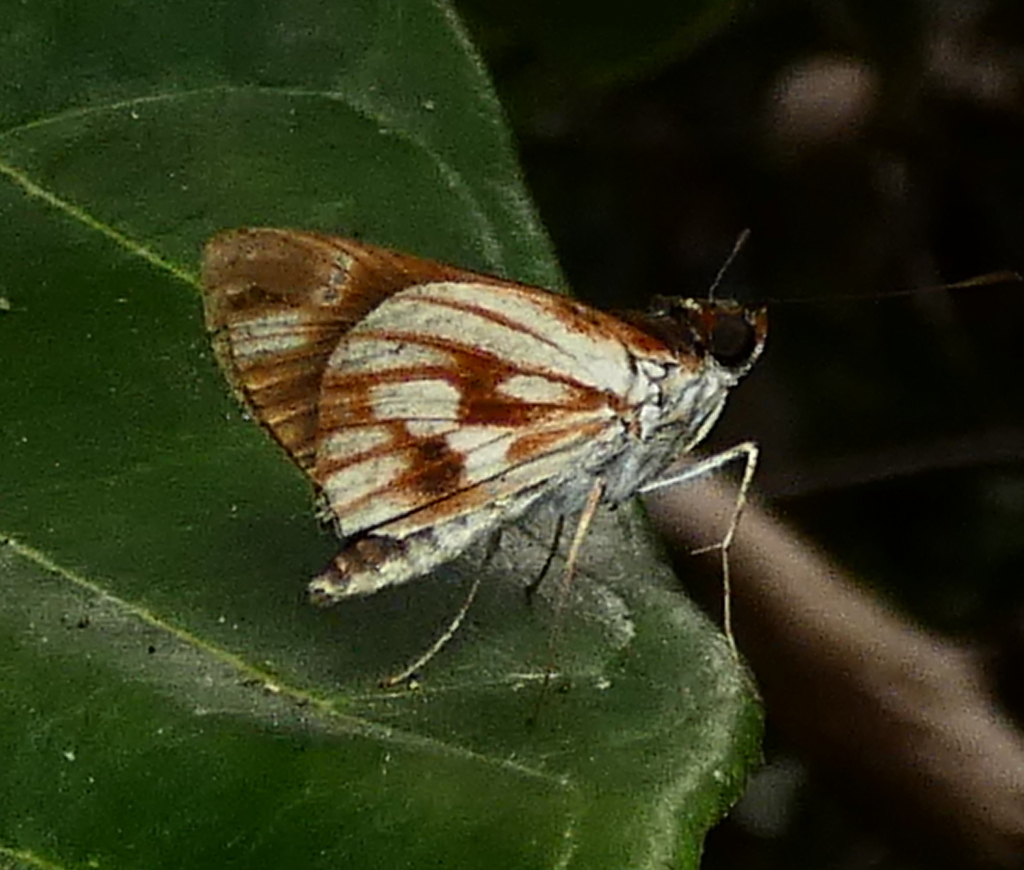

Scientific classification
- Kingdom: Animalia
- Phylum: Arthropoda
- Class: Insecta
- Order: Lepidoptera
- Family: Hesperiidae
- Genus: Vettius
- Species: V. fantasos

Binomial name
- Vettius fantasos Stoll, 1780

Synonyms
- Hesperia euchera Plötz, 1882; Papilio abebalus Stoll, 1781; Hesperia eucherus Plötz, 1882

= Vettius fantasos =

Species of insect

Vettius fantasos, also known as the fantastic skipper, is a species of butterfly belonging to the family Hesperiidae.

It is native to Central and South America. It also rarely strays into the Lower Rio Grande Valley of Texas.

== Description ==
The underside of the hindwing is shining ivory white to silver with veins outlined in red-brown. The wingspan ranges from 1 1/16 to 1 1/4 inches (2.7-3.2 centimeters).
