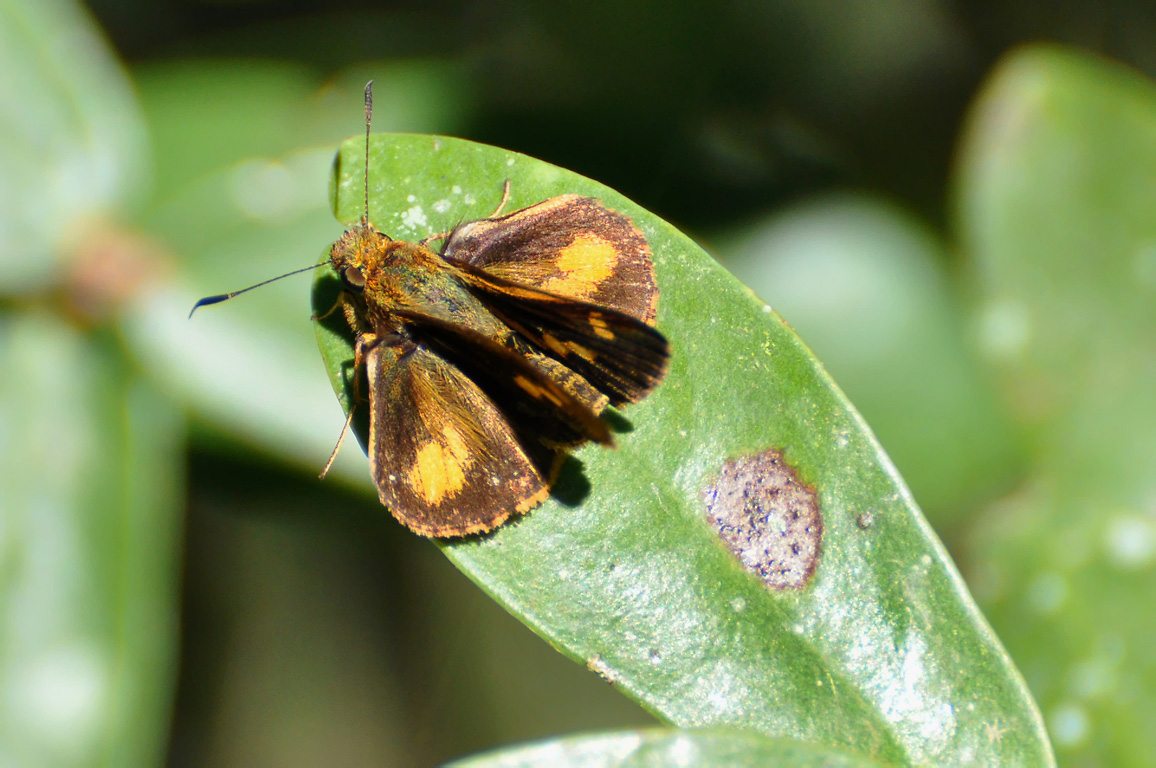
- Pheraeus odilia

Scientific classification
- Kingdom: Animalia
- Phylum: Arthropoda
- Class: Insecta
- Order: Lepidoptera
- Family: Hesperiidae
- Subtribe: Moncina
- Genus: Pheraeus; Godman, [1900]

= Pheraeus =

Genus of butterflies

Pheraeus is a genus of skippers in the family Hesperiidae.

== Species ==
Recognised species in the genus Pheraeus include:

- Pheraeus odilia (Plötz, 1884)
