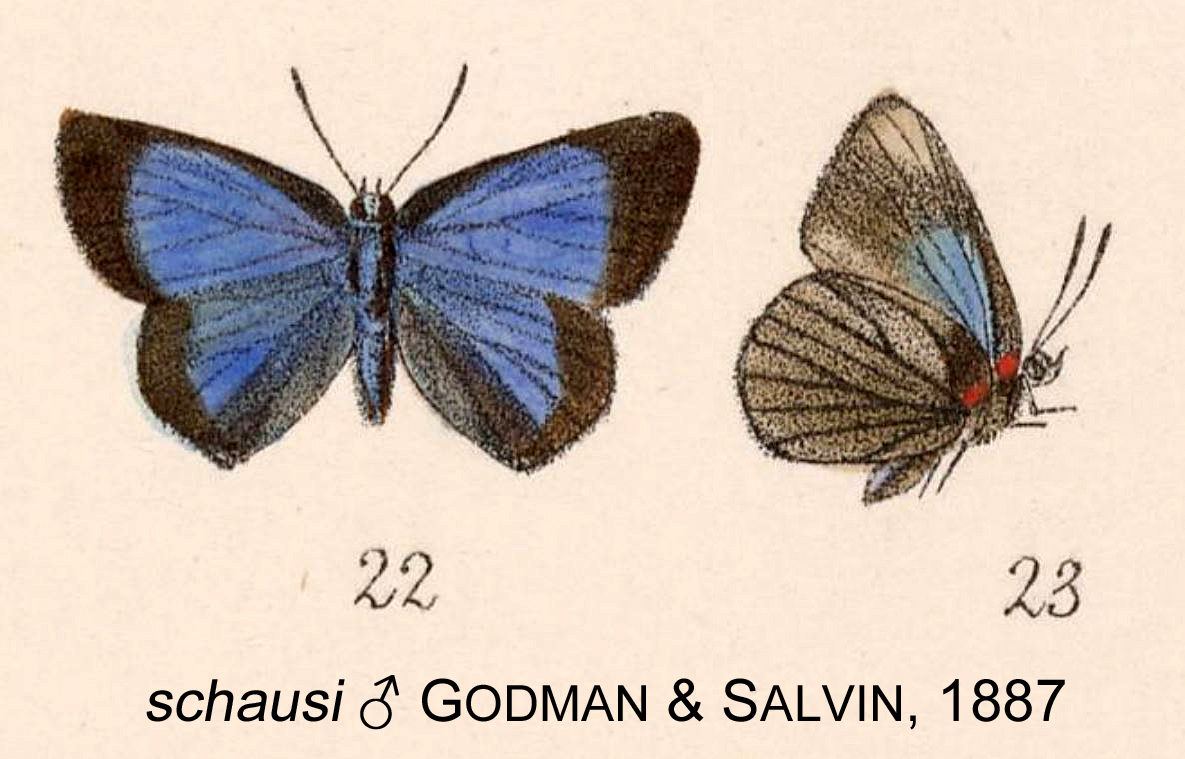

Scientific classification
- Kingdom: Animalia
- Phylum: Arthropoda
- Clade: Pancrustacea
- Class: Insecta
- Order: Lepidoptera
- Family: Lycaenidae
- Genus: Ipidecla
- Species: I. schausi

Binomial name
- Ipidecla schausi Godman & Salvin, 1887

Synonyms
- Thecla schausi Godman & Salvin, [1887]; Thecla insignis Godman & Salvin, [1887]; Thecla miranda Godman & Salvin, [1887]; Ipidecla euprepes Hayward, 1949

= Ipidecla schausi =

Species of butterfly

Ipidecla schausi, also called Schaus' hairstreak or Salvin's dwarf, is a small butterfly in the family Lycaenidae, sub-family Theclinae and genus Ipidecla.

== Taxonomy ==
Ipidecla schausi was first described by Frederick DuCane Godman and Osbert Salvin in 1887, under the name Thecla schausi (in Mexico), Thecla insignis (in Panama) and Thecla miranda (in Brazil). It had separately been described as Ipidecla euprepes by Hayward in 1949 (in Argentina).

== Description ==
The top of the male is beige gray very largely suffused with light blue metallic, that of the female is beige, veined with brown.

The reverse in the male is gray veined with black, adorned with a red spot in the basal area of the anterior and posterior wings. In the female, the reverse is yellow veined with black;

== Ecology and distribution ==
Ipidecla schausi is present in America in three isolates in Mexico and Panama, in Argentina and Paraguay, and in Peru, Brazil and Guyana.

=== Biotope ===
Ipidecla schausi lives in humid tropical forests.

== See also ==
- Lepidoptera
- Lycaenidae
- List of butterflies of French Guiana
