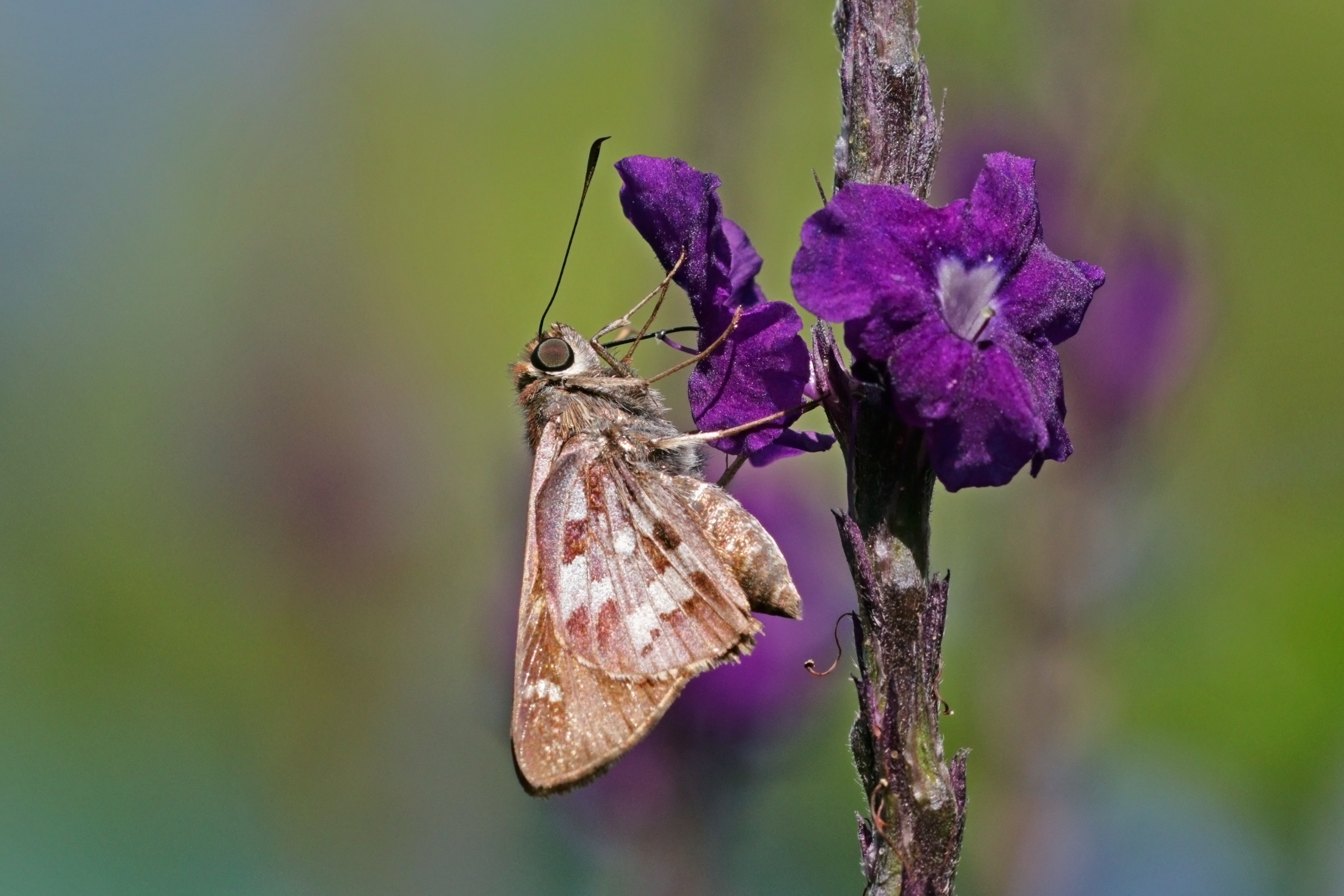
- Costa Rican skipper (Halotus rica)

Scientific classification
- Kingdom: Animalia
- Phylum: Arthropoda
- Class: Insecta
- Order: Lepidoptera
- Family: Hesperiidae
- Tribe: Hesperiini
- Subtribe: Moncina; A. D. Warren, 2008

= Moncina =

Tribe of butterflies

Moncina is a subtribe of butterflies in the skipper subfamily Hesperiinae.

== Genera ==
The following genera are recognised in the subtribe Moncina:

- Adlerodea Hayward, 1940 - 4 species
- Alerema Hayward, 1942 - 1 species
- Alychna Grishin, 2019 - 7 species
- Amblyscirtes Scudder, 1872 - 29 species
- Arita Evans, 1955 - 4 species
- Artines Godman, 1901 - 10 species
- Artonia Grishin, 2019 - 1 species
- Brownus - 1 species
- Bruna Evans, 1955
- Callimormus Scudder, 1872 - 9 species
- Cantha Evans, 1955 - 6 species
- Chitta Grishin, 2019 - 1 species
- Cobalopsis Godman, 1900 - 16 species
- Contrastia Grishin, 2022 - 1 species
- Corra Grishin, 2019 - 1 species
- Crinifemur Steinhauser, 2008 - 1 species
- Cumbre Evans, 1955 - 3 species
- Cymaenes Scudder, 1872 - 27 species
- Dion Godman, 1901 - 3 species
- Dubia - 1 species
- Duroca Grishin, 2019
- Eprius (Godman, 1901) - 3 species
- Eutocus Godman, 1901 - 8 species
- Eutus Grishin, 2022
- Eutychide Godman, 1900 - 8 species
- Fidius Grishin, 2019 - 2 species
- Gallio (Schaus, 1902) - 7 species
- Ginungagapus Carneiro, Mielke & Casagrande, 2015 - 4 species
- Godmia Grishin, 2022 - 1 species
- Gracilata Grishin, 2022 - 1 species
- Gubrus Grishin, 2022 - 1 species
- Gufa Grishin, 2022 - 2 species
- Halotus Godman, 1900 - 3 species
- Haza - 1 species
- Hermio Grishin, 2022 - 2 species
- Igapophilus Mielke, 1980 - 1 species
- Inglorius Austin, 1997 - 1 species
- Joanna Evans, 1955 - 3 species
- Koria Grishin, 2022 - 1 species
- Lamponia Evans, 1955 - 3 species
- Lattus Grishin, 2022 - 1 species
- Lento Evans, 1955 - 19 species
- Lerema Scudder, 1872 - 16 species
- Lerodea Scudder, 1872 - 8 species
- Levina (Plötz, 1884) - 1 species
- Lucida Evans, 1955- 5 species
- Ludens Evans, 1955 - 12 species
- Lurida Grishin, 2019 - 1 species
- Mit Grishin, 2022 - 2 species
- Mnasicles Godman, 1901 - 13 species
- Mnasides Godman, 1901 - 3 species
- Mnasitheus Godman, 1900 - 11 species
- Mnestheus Godman, 1901 - 2 species
- Moeris Godman, 1900 - 5 species
- Molla Evans, 1955 - 1 species
- Monca Evans, 1955 - 4 species
- Mucia Godman, 1900 - 4 species
- Naevolus (Mabille, 1883) - 1 species
- Nastra Evans, 1955 - 11 species
- Niconiades Hübner, 1821 - 18 species
- Onophas Godman, 1900 - 3 species
- Panca (Hayward, 1934) - 1 species
- Papias Evans, 1955 - 11 species
- Paracarystus Godman, 1900 - 3 species
- Pares Bell, 1959 - 2 species
- Parphorus Godman, 1900 - 15 species
- Peba (Schaus, 1902) - 1 species
- Phanes Godman, 1901 - 7 species
- Pheraeus Godman, 1900 - 11 species
- Phlebodes Hübner, 1819 - 12 species
- Picova Grishin, 2022 - 2 species
- Psoralis Mabille, 1904 - 14 species
- Punta Evans, 1955 - 1 species
- Radiatus Mielke, 1968 - 1 species
- Ralis Grishin, 2019 - 2 species
- Rectava Grishin, 2022 - 4 species
- Rhinthon Godman, 1900 - 2 species
- Rhomba Grishin, 2022 - 1 species
- Rigga - 6 species
- Saturnus Evans, 1955 - 5 species
- Sodalia Evans, 1955 - 3 species
- Sucova (Schaus, 1902) - 1 species
- Tava - 1 species
- Thargella Godman, 1900 - 4 species
- Thoon Godman, 1900 - 12 species
- Tigasis Godman, 1901 - 9 species
- Tricrista Grishin, 2019 - 5 species
- Veadda Grishin, 2019 - 1 species
- Vehilius Godman, 1900 - 12 species
- Venas Evans, 1955 - 2 species
- Vertica Evans, 1955 - 4 species
- Vettius Godman, 1901 - 24 species
- Vidius Evans, 1955 - 15 species
- Vinius Godman, 1900 - 3 species
- Vinpeius (Evans, 1955) - 1 species
- Virga Evans, 1955- 8 species
- Viridina Grishin, 2019 - 3 species
- Vistigma Hayward, 1939 - 7 species
- Zalomes Bell, 1947
- Zariaspes Godman, 1900 - 2 species
