= Moeris (skipper) =

Scientific classification
- Kingdom: Animalia
- Phylum: Arthropoda
- Class: Insecta
- Order: Lepidoptera
- Family: Hesperiidae
- Subtribe: Moncina
- Genus: Moeris; Godman, 1900

Genus of butterflies

Moeris is a genus of skippers in the family Hesperiidae.

== Species ==
Recognised species in the genus Moeris include:

- Moeris anna (Mabille, 1898)
- Moeris striga (Geyer, 1832)
- Moeris stroma Evans, 1955
