= Vinius =

Scientific classification
- Kingdom: Animalia
- Phylum: Arthropoda
- Class: Insecta
- Order: Lepidoptera
- Family: Hesperiidae
- Subtribe: Moncina
- Genus: Vinius; Godman, 1900

Genus of butterflies

Vinius is a genus of skipper butterflies in the family Hesperiidae.

== Species ==
The following species are recognised in the genus Vinius:

- Vinius letis (Plötz, 1883)
- Vinius pulcherrimus Hayward, 1934
- Vinius tryhana (Kaye, 1914)
