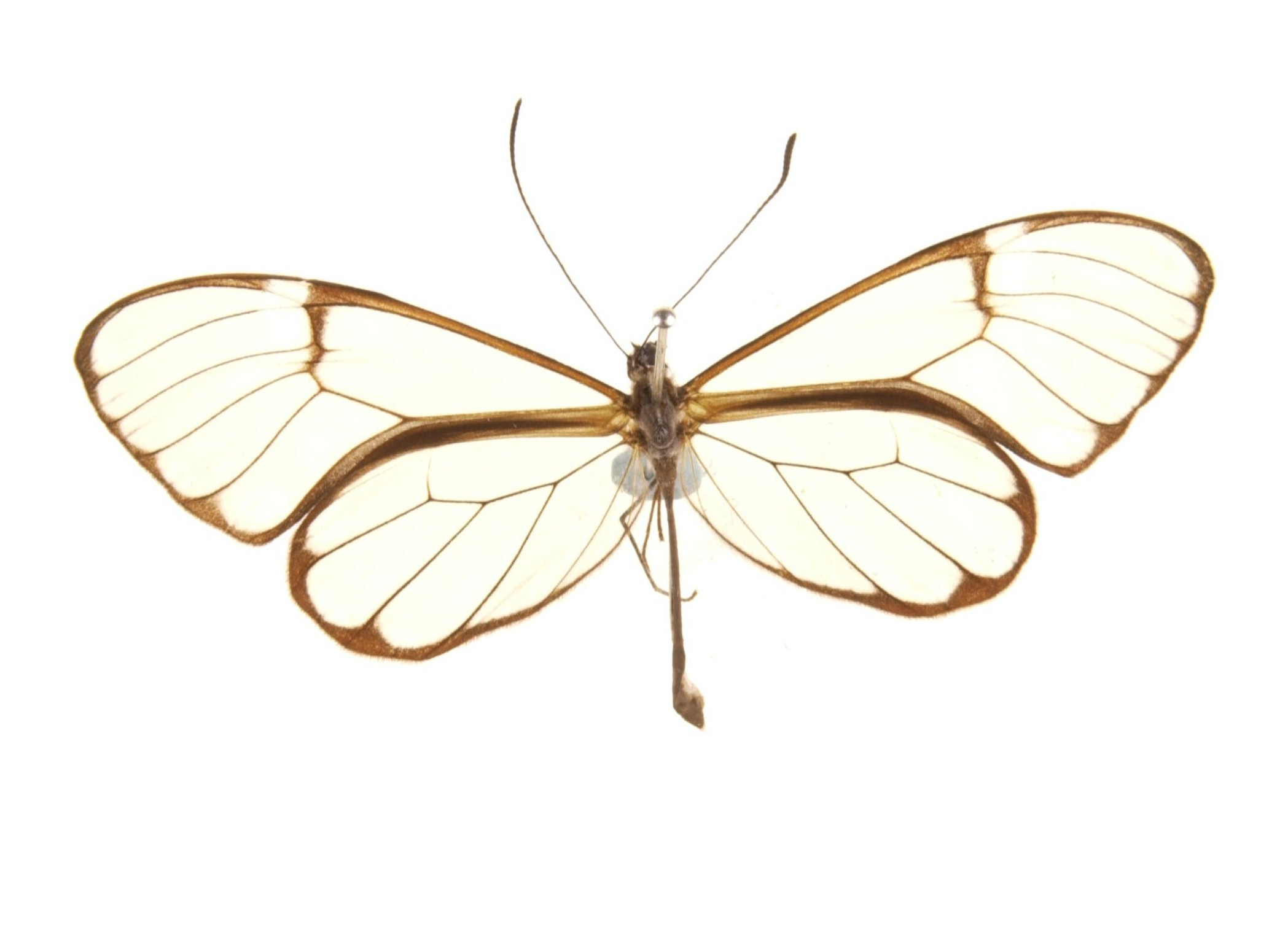
- Episcada apuleia

Scientific classification
- Domain: Eukaryota
- Kingdom: Animalia
- Phylum: Arthropoda
- Class: Insecta
- Order: Lepidoptera
- Family: Nymphalidae
- Tribe: Ithomiini
- Genus: Episcada; Godman & Salvin, [1879]

Species
- See text

Synonyms
- Prittwitzia Brown & Ebert, 1970; Ceratiscada Brown & Ferreira d'Almeida, 1970

= Episcada =

Genus of brush-footed butterflies

Episcada is a genus of clearwing (ithomiine) butterflies, named by Frederick DuCane Godman and Osbert Salvin in 1879. They are in the brush-footed butterfly family, Nymphalidae.

== Species ==
Arranged alphabetically:

- Episcada apuleia (Hewitson, 1868)
- Episcada canilla (Hewitson, 1874)
- Episcada carcinia Schaus, 1902
- Episcada clausina (Hewitson, 1876)
- Episcada doto (Hübner, [1806])
- Episcada hemixanthe (C. & R. Felder, 1865)
- Episcada hymen Haensch, 1905
- Episcada hymenaea (Prittwitz, 1865)
- Episcada mira (Hewitson, 1877)
- Episcada philoclea (Hewitson, [1855])
- Episcada polita Weymer, 1899
- Episcada salvinia (Bates, 1864)
- Episcada sulphurea Haensch, 1905
- Episcada sylpha Haensch, 1905
- Episcada ticidella (Hewitson, 1869)
- Episcada vitrea d'Almeida & Mielke, 1967
