= Mnestheus (skipper) =

Scientific classification
- Kingdom: Animalia
- Phylum: Arthropoda
- Class: Insecta
- Order: Lepidoptera
- Family: Hesperiidae
- Subtribe: Moncina
- Genus: Mnestheus; Godman, 1901

Genus of butterflies

Mnestheus is a genus of skippers in the family Hesperiidae.

== Species ==
The following species are recognised in the genus Mnestheus:

- Mnestheus damma (Evans, 1955)
- Mnestheus ittona (Butler, 1870)
- Mnestheus servilius (Möschler, 1882)
