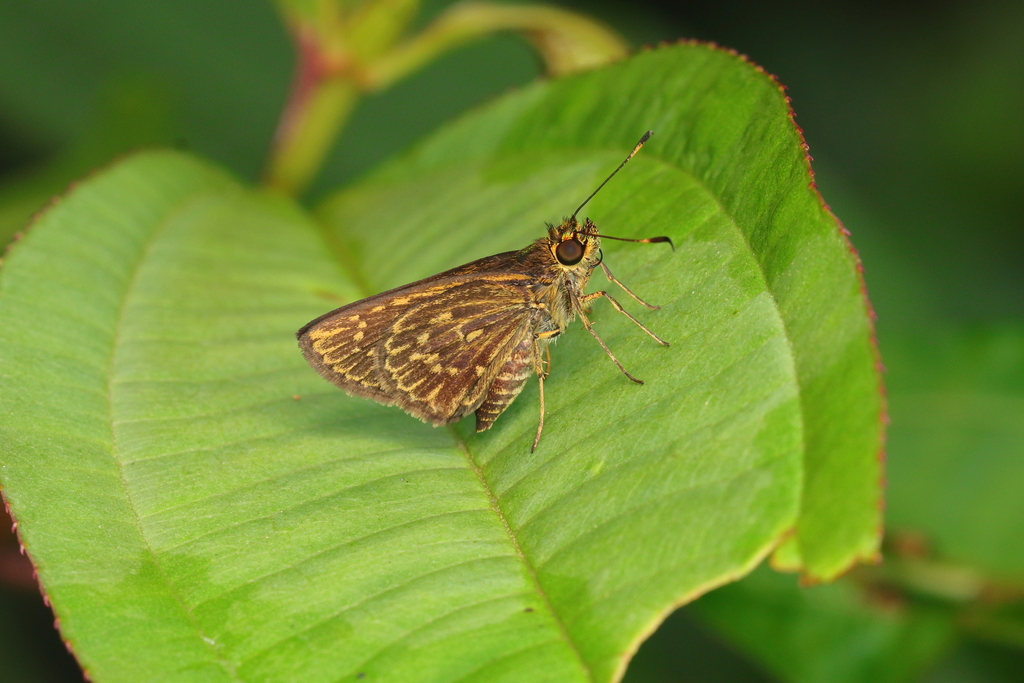

Scientific classification
- Kingdom: Animalia
- Phylum: Arthropoda
- Class: Insecta
- Order: Lepidoptera
- Family: Hesperiidae
- Subtribe: Moncina
- Genus: Gallio; Evans, [1955]

= Gallio (skipper) =

Genus of butterflies

Gallio is a genus of skipper butterflies in the family Hesperiidae.

== Species ==
Recognised species in the genus Gallio include:

- Gallio carasta (Schaus, 1902)
- Gallio danius (Bell, 1941)
- Gallio gallio (Schaus, 1902)
- Gallio garima (Schaus, 1902)
- Gallio madius (E. Bell, 1941)
- Gallio massarus (E. Bell, 1940)
- Gallio seriatus (Mabille, 1891)
