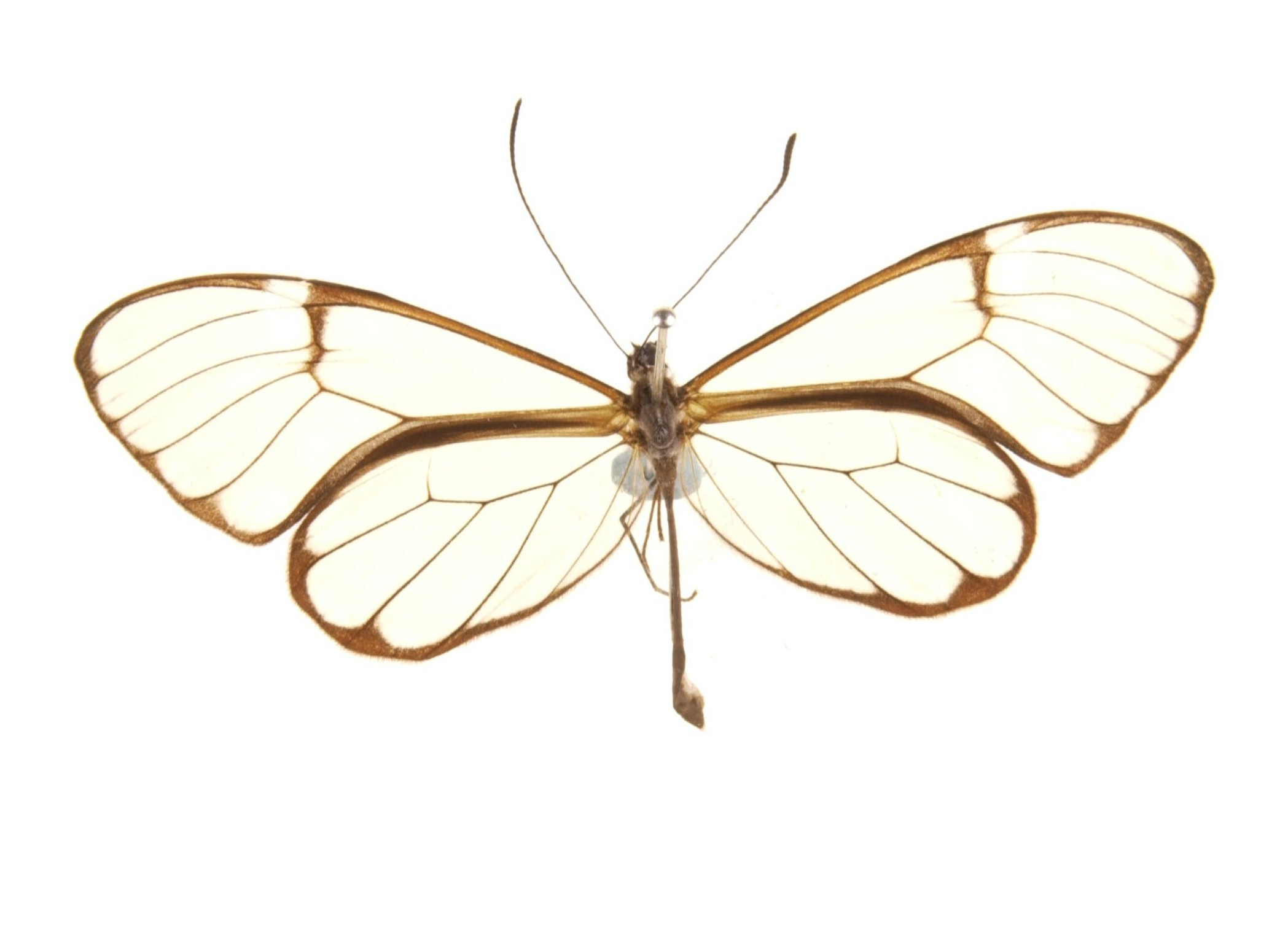

Scientific classification
- Domain: Eukaryota
- Kingdom: Animalia
- Phylum: Arthropoda
- Class: Insecta
- Order: Lepidoptera
- Family: Nymphalidae
- Genus: Episcada
- Species: E. apuleia

Binomial name
- Episcada apuleia (Hewitson, 1868)

Synonyms
- Ithomia apuleia Hewitson, 1868; Pteronymia apuleia

= Episcada apuleia =

Species of butterfly

Episcada apuleia is a species of butterfly of the family Nymphalidae. It is found in Ecuador, Bolivia and Peru.

The wingspan is 50–60 mm.

== Subspecies ==
- Episcada apuleia apuleia (Ecuador)
- Episcada apuleia santanella (Haensch, 1903) (Ecuador)
- Episcada apuleia cora Haensch, 1909 (Bolivia)
