= Vertica (butterfly) =

Scientific classification
- Kingdom: Animalia
- Phylum: Arthropoda
- Class: Insecta
- Order: Lepidoptera
- Family: Hesperiidae
- Subtribe: Moncina
- Genus: Vertica; Evans, 1955

Genus of butterflies

Vertica is a genus of skippers in the family Hesperiidae.
