= Vidius =

Scientific classification
- Kingdom: Animalia
- Phylum: Arthropoda
- Class: Insecta
- Order: Lepidoptera
- Family: Hesperiidae
- Subtribe: Moncina
- Genus: Vidius; Evans, 1955

Genus of butterflies

Vidius is a genus of skippers in the family Hesperiidae.

== Species ==
Recognised species in the genus Vidius include:

- Vidius felus Mielke, 1968
- Vidius fraus (Godman, 1900)
- Vidius vidius (Mabille, 1891)

=== Former species ===
- Vidius anna (Mabille, 1898) - transferred to Moeris anna (Mabille, 1898)
- Vidius fido Evans, 1955 - transferred to Fidius fido (Evans, 1955)
- Vidius laska Evans, 1955 - transferred to Psoralis laska (Evans, 1955)
- Vidius nappa Evans, 1955 - transferred to Nastra nappa (Evans, 1955)
- Vidius nostra Evans, 1955 - transferred to Rectava nostra (Evans, 1955)
- Vidius ochraceus Mielke, 1980 - transferred to Fidius ochraceus (Mielke, 1980)
