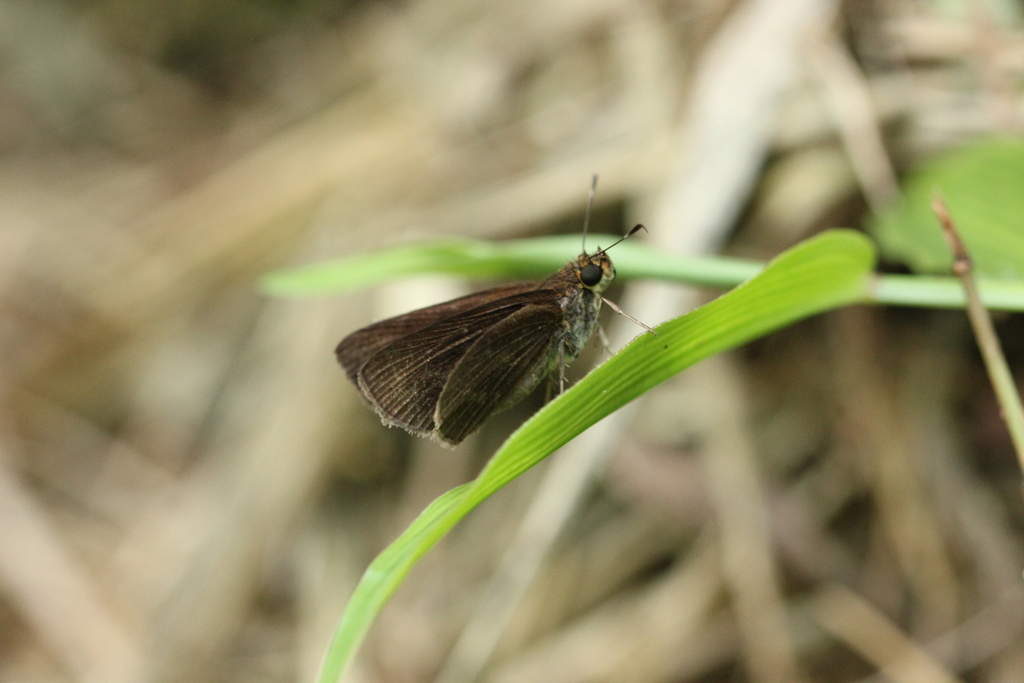

Scientific classification
- Kingdom: Animalia
- Phylum: Arthropoda
- Class: Insecta
- Order: Lepidoptera
- Family: Hesperiidae
- Subtribe: Moncina
- Genus: Eprius; Godman, 1901

= Eprius =

Genus of butterflies

Eprius is a genus of skipper butterflies in the family Hesperiidae.

== Species ==
- Eprius repens Evans, 1955
- Eprius repta Evans, 1955
- Eprius veleda Godman, 1901
