= Lamponia =

Scientific classification
- Kingdom: Animalia
- Phylum: Arthropoda
- Class: Insecta
- Order: Lepidoptera
- Family: Hesperiidae
- Subtribe: Moncina
- Genus: Lamponia; Evans, 1955

Genus of butterflies

Lamponia is a genus of skippers in the family Hesperiidae.

== Species ==
Recognised species in the genus Lamponia include:

- Lamponia lamponia (Hewitson, 1876)
- Lamponia ploetzii (Capronnier, 1874)
