= Joanna (skipper) =

Scientific classification
- Kingdom: Animalia
- Phylum: Arthropoda
- Class: Insecta
- Order: Lepidoptera
- Family: Hesperiidae
- Subtribe: Moncina
- Genus: Joanna; Evans, [1955]

Genus of butterflies

Joanna is a genus of skipper butterflies in the family Hesperiidae.

== Species ==
Recognised species in the genus Joanna include:

- Joanna joanna Evans, [1955]
