= Molla molla =

Scientific classification
- Kingdom: Animalia
- Phylum: Arthropoda
- Class: Insecta
- Order: Lepidoptera
- Family: Hesperiidae
- Subtribe: Moncina
- Genus: Molla; Evans, [1955]
- Species: M. molla

Binomial name
- Molla molla Evans, [1955]

Genus of butterflies

Molla molla is a species of skipper butterfly in the family Hesperiidae. It is the only species in the monotypic genus Molla.
