= Sodalia =

Scientific classification
- Kingdom: Animalia
- Phylum: Arthropoda
- Class: Insecta
- Order: Lepidoptera
- Family: Hesperiidae
- Subtribe: Moncina
- Genus: Sodalia; Evans, 1955

Type species
- Pamphila sodalis Butler, 1877

Genus of butterflies

Sodalia is a genus of skippers in the family Hesperiidae.

== Species ==
Recognised species in the genus Sodalia include:

- Sodalia argyrospila (Mabille, 1876)
- Sodalia coler (Schaus, 1902)
- Sodalia petiti Gaviria-Ortiz, Dolibaina & Warren in Gaviria-Ortiz et al., 2020
- Sodalia sodalis (Butler, 1877)
