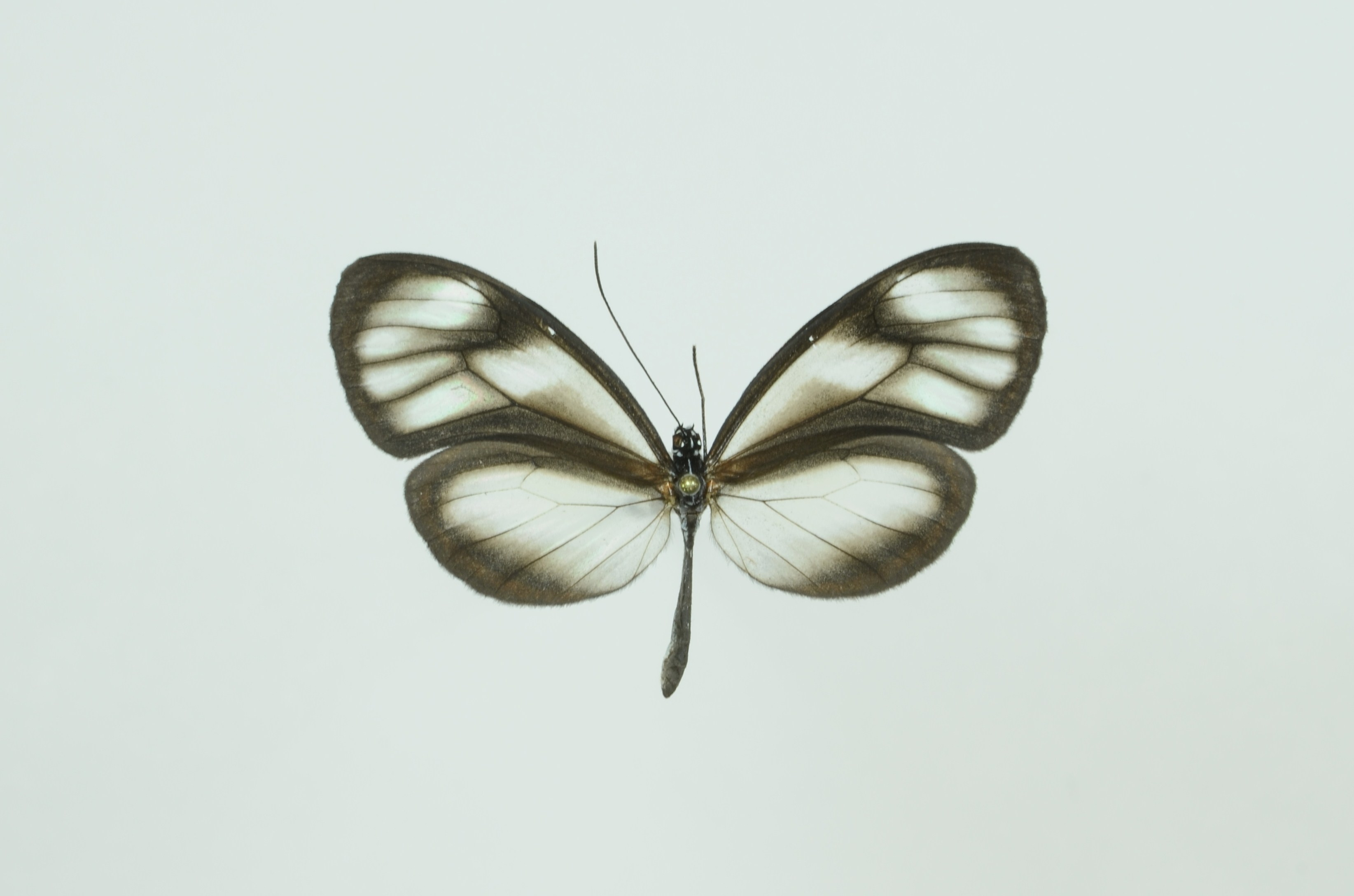

Scientific classification
- Kingdom: Animalia
- Phylum: Arthropoda
- Class: Insecta
- Order: Lepidoptera
- Family: Nymphalidae
- Genus: Hypoleria
- Species: H. sarepta

Binomial name
- Hypoleria sarepta (Hewitson, [1852])

Synonyms
- Ithomia sarepta Hewitson, 1852; Ithomia virginia Hewitson, [1853]; Miraleria funerula Zikán, 1942; Hypoleria goiana d'Almeida, 1951

= Hypoleria sarepta =

Species of butterfly

Hypoleria sarepta is a species of butterfly of the family Nymphalidae. It is found in Brazil, Colombia and Peru.

== Subspecies ==
- H. s. sarepta (Brazil (Amazonas))
- H. s. virginia (Hewitson, [1853]) (Brazil (Amazonas))
- H. s. cidonia (Hewitson, [1857]) (Colombia)
- H. s. oriana (Hewitson, [1859]) (Brazil (Amazonas))
- H. s. famina Haensch, 1909 (Peru)
- H. s. goiana d'Almeida, 1951 (Brazil (Goiás))
- H. s. olerioides d'Almeida, 1951 (Brazil (Rondônia))
- H. s. orianula Bryk, 1953 (Peru)
- H. s. vitiosa Lamas, 1985 (Peru)
