= Virga (butterfly) =

Scientific classification
- Kingdom: Animalia
- Phylum: Arthropoda
- Class: Insecta
- Order: Lepidoptera
- Family: Hesperiidae
- Subtribe: Moncina
- Genus: Virga; Evans, [1955]

Genus of butterflies

Virga is a genus of skippers in the family Hesperiidae.

== Species ==
Recognised species in the genus Virga include:

- Virga virginius ( Möschler, 1883)
