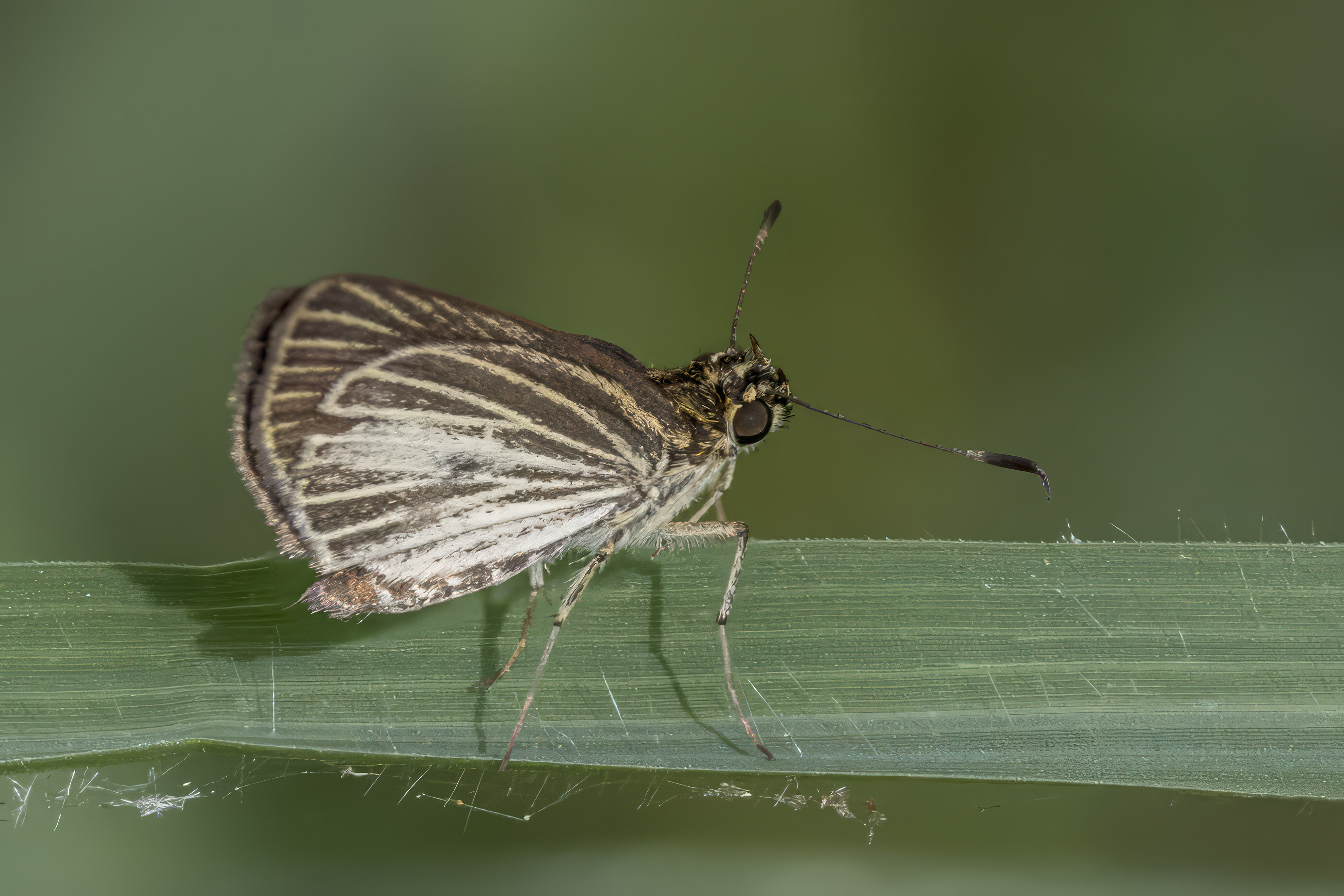
- C. radiola janna, Colombia

Scientific classification
- Kingdom: Animalia
- Phylum: Arthropoda
- Class: Insecta
- Order: Lepidoptera
- Family: Hesperiidae
- Subtribe: Moncina
- Genus: Callimormus; Scudder 1872

Type species
- Callimormus juventus Scudder, 1872.

= Callimormus =

Genus of butterflies

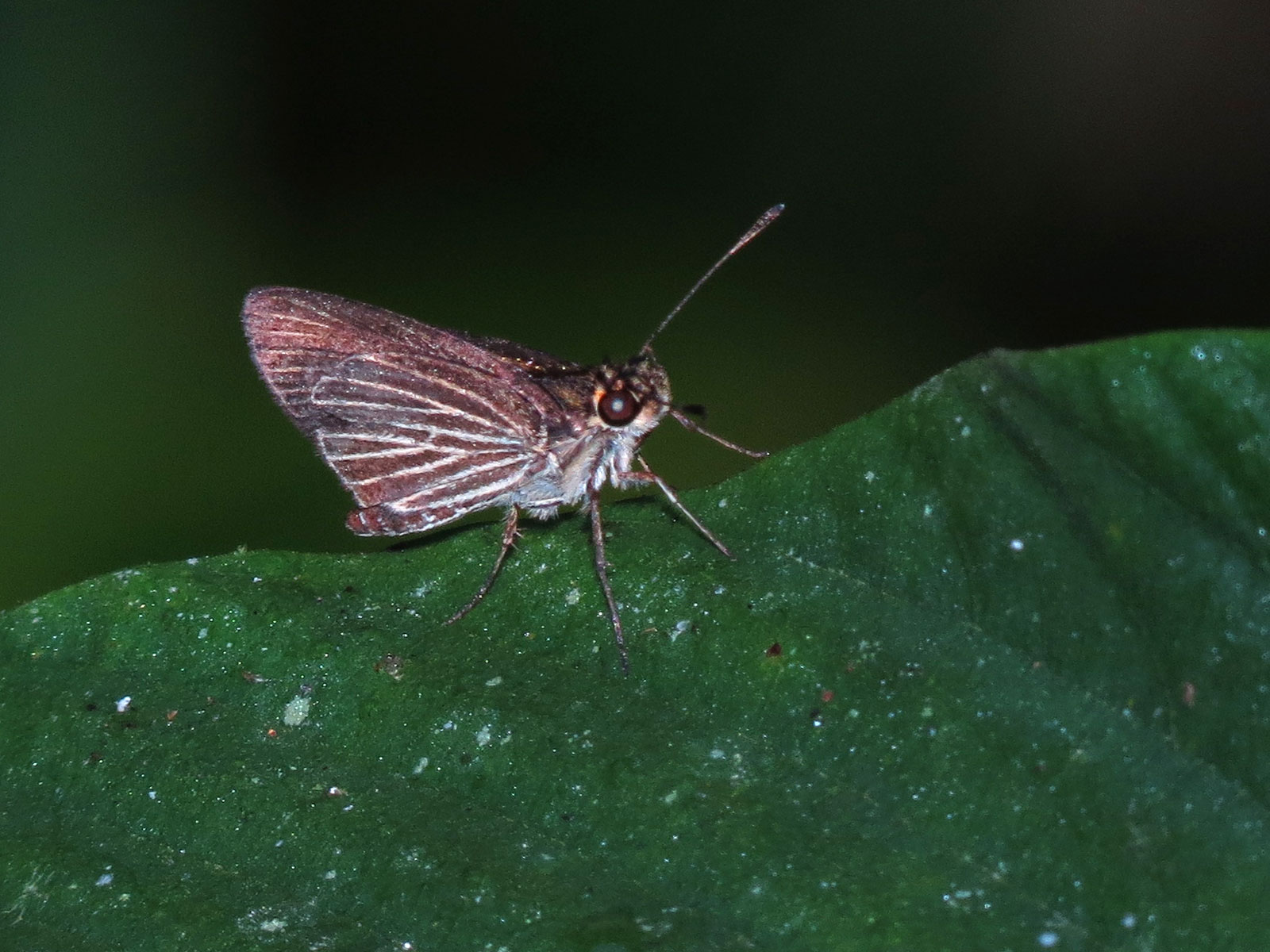
C. radiola radiola, Panama

Callimormus is a genus of skippers in the family Hesperiidae.

== Species ==
The following species are recognised in the genus Callimormus:

- Callimormus alsimo
- Callimormus corades
- Callimormus corus
- Callimormus interpunctata
- Callimormus juventus
- Callimormus radiola
- Callimormus rivera
- Callimormus saturnus
- Callimormus simplicius
