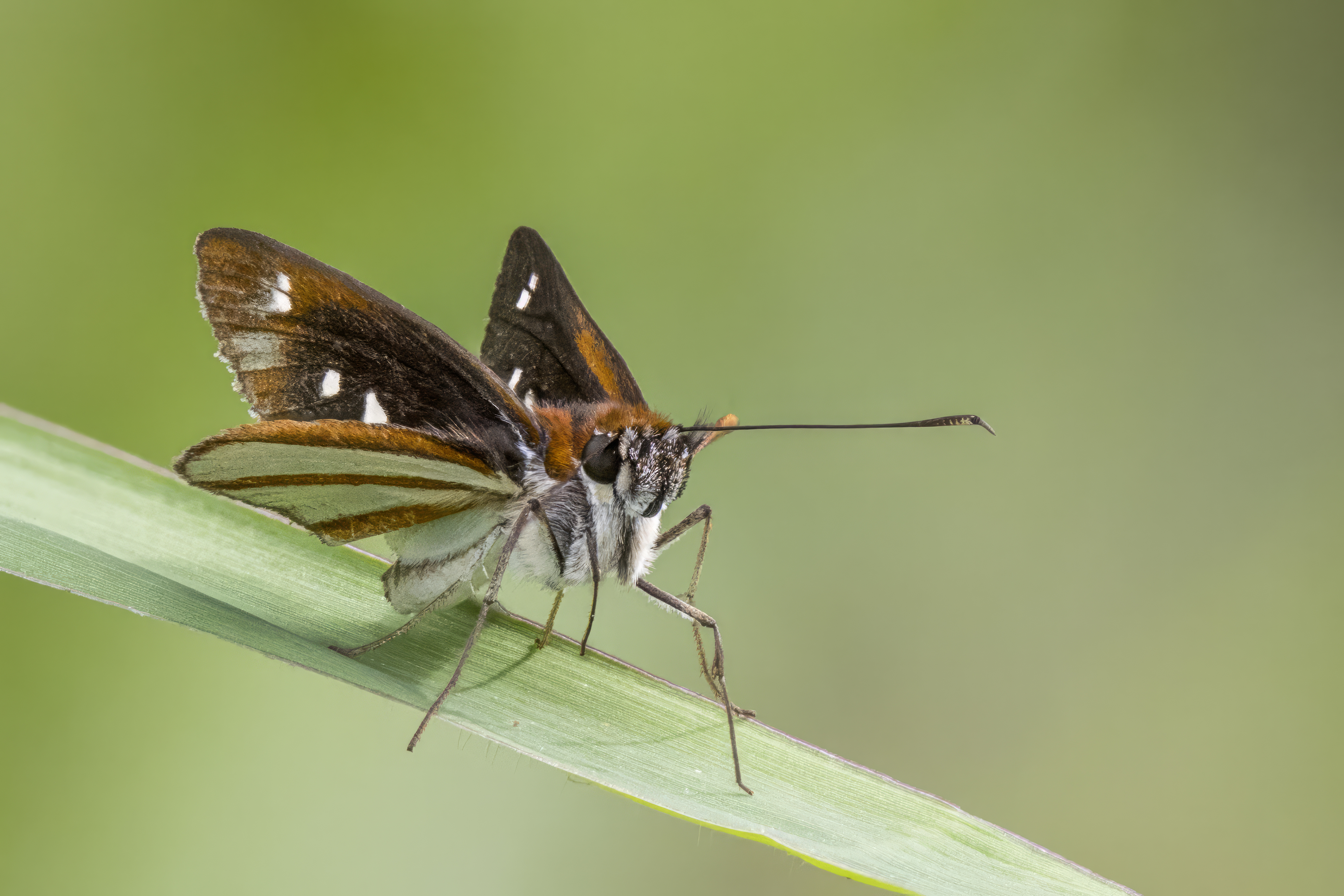
- V. coryna catargyra, Colombia

Scientific classification
- Kingdom: Animalia
- Phylum: Arthropoda
- Class: Insecta
- Order: Lepidoptera
- Family: Hesperiidae
- Subtribe: Moncina
- Genus: Vettius; Godman, 1901

= Vettius =

Genus of butterflies

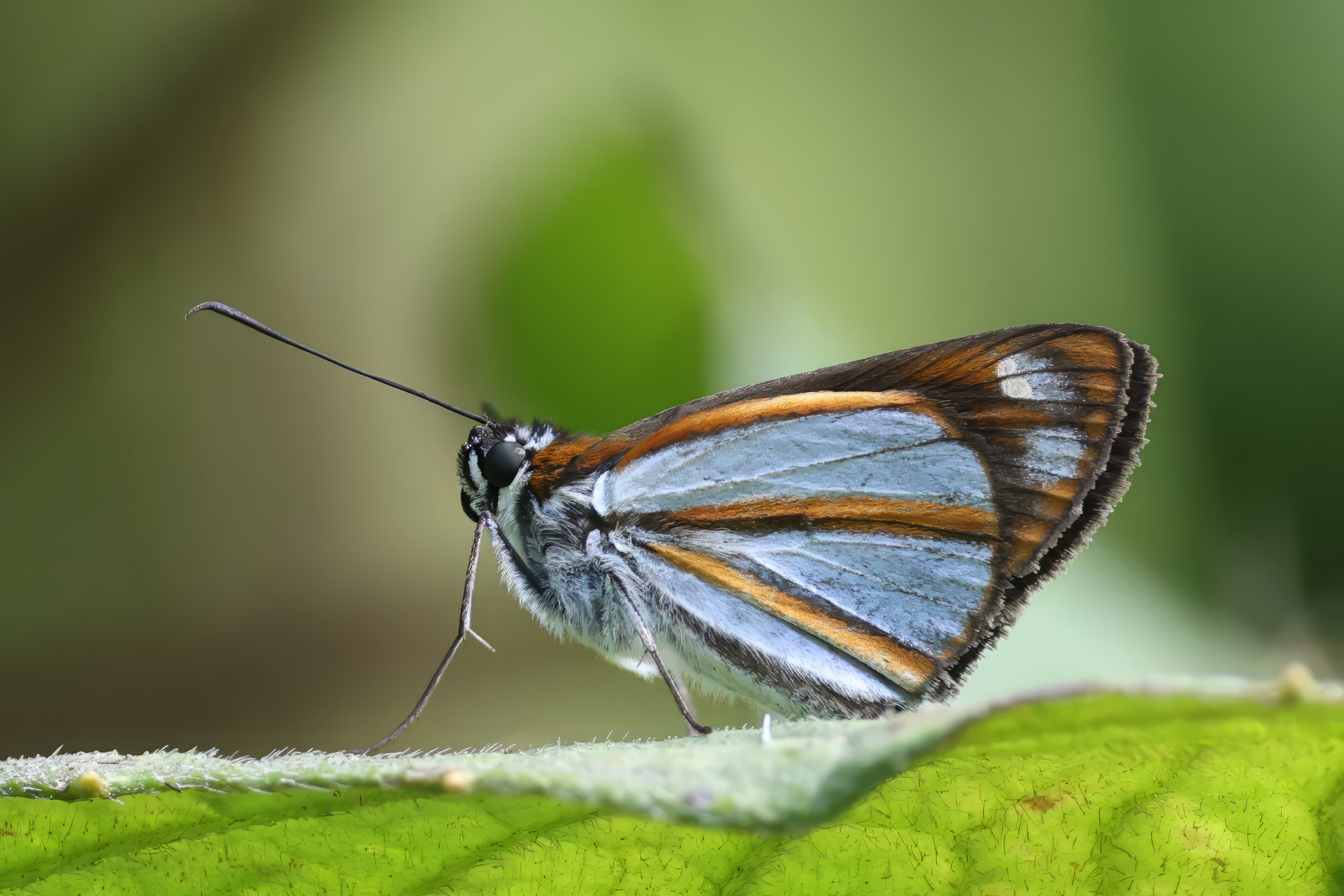
V. coryna coryna, Colombia

Vettius is a genus of skippers in the family Hesperiidae.

== Species ==
Recognised species in the genus Vettius include:

- Vettius phyllus Cramer, 1777
- Vettius pica
- Vettius triangularis (Hübner, [1831])

=== Former species ===
- Vettius arva Evans, 1955 - transferred to Psoralis arva (Evans, 1955)
- Vettius lafrenaye (Latreille, [1824]) - synonymized with Dubiella dubius (Stoll, 1781)
- Vettius fuldai Bell, 1930 - transferred to Phlebodes fuldai (Bell, 1930)
- Vettius yalta Evans, 1955 - synonymized with Phlebodes fuldai (Bell, 1930)
