= Peba =

Scientific classification
- Kingdom: Animalia
- Phylum: Arthropoda
- Clade: Pancrustacea
- Class: Insecta
- Order: Lepidoptera
- Family: Hesperiidae
- Subtribe: Moncina
- Genus: Peba; Mielke, 1968
- Species: P. verames

Binomial name
- Peba verames (Schaus, 1902)

Synonyms
- (Species): Callimormus verames Schaus, 1902; Peba striata Mielke, 1968

Genus of butterflies

Peba is a genus of skipper butterflies in the family Hesperiidae. It has one species, Peba verames.
