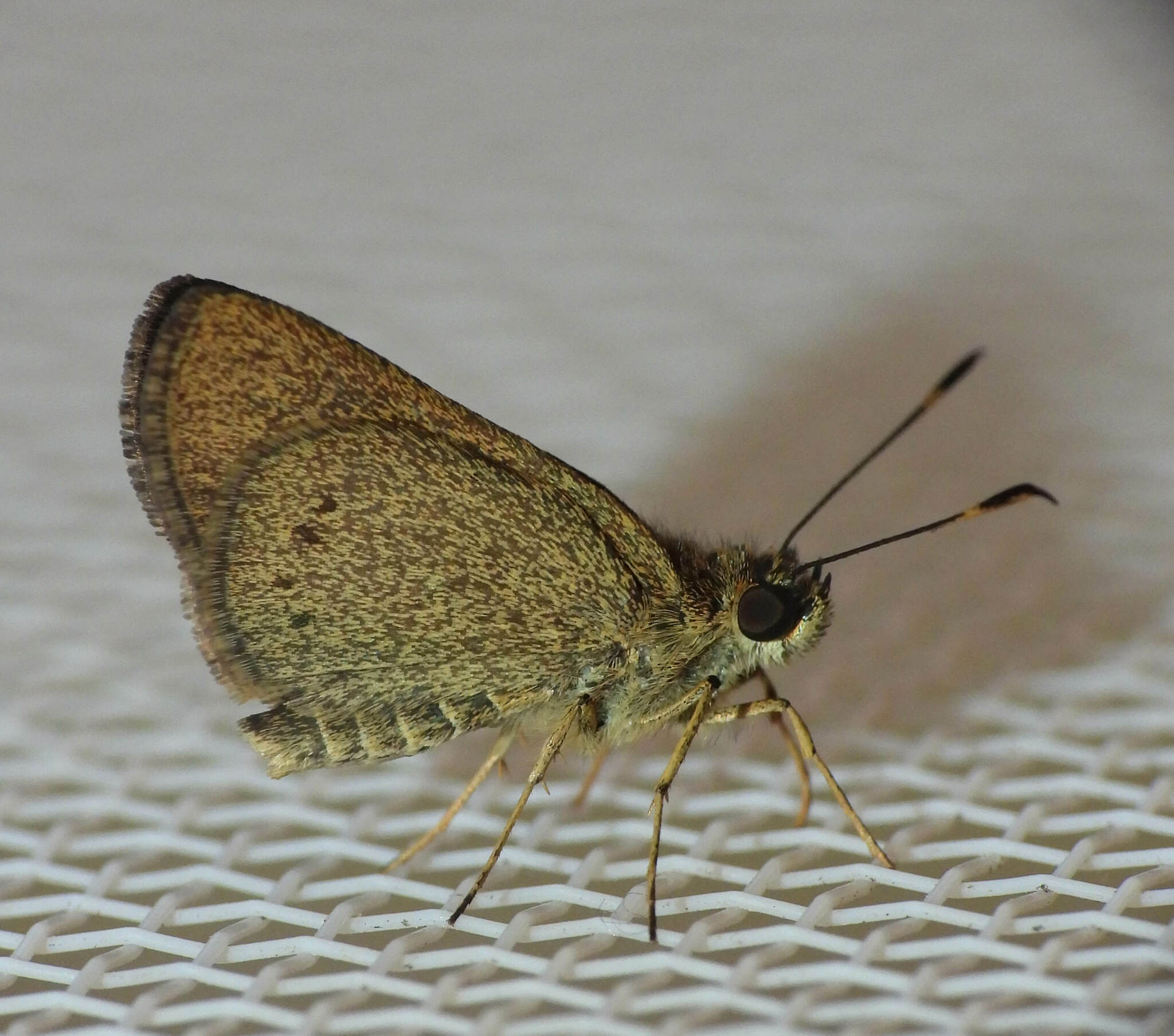
- Adlerodea mineira

Scientific classification
- Kingdom: Animalia
- Phylum: Arthropoda
- Clade: Pancrustacea
- Class: Insecta
- Order: Lepidoptera
- Family: Hesperiidae
- Subtribe: Moncina
- Genus: Adlerodea; Hayward, 1940

= Adlerodea =

Genus of butterflies

Adlerodea is a Neotropical genus of grass skippers in the family Hesperiidae.

== Species ==
- Adlerodea lemba Evans, 1955 – type locality Brazil
- Adlerodea mineira O. Mielke, 1968 – type locality Brazil
- Adlerodea modesta Hayward, 1940 – type locality Argentina

=== Former species ===
- Adlerodea petrovna - transferred to Ludens petrovna (Schaus, 1902)
