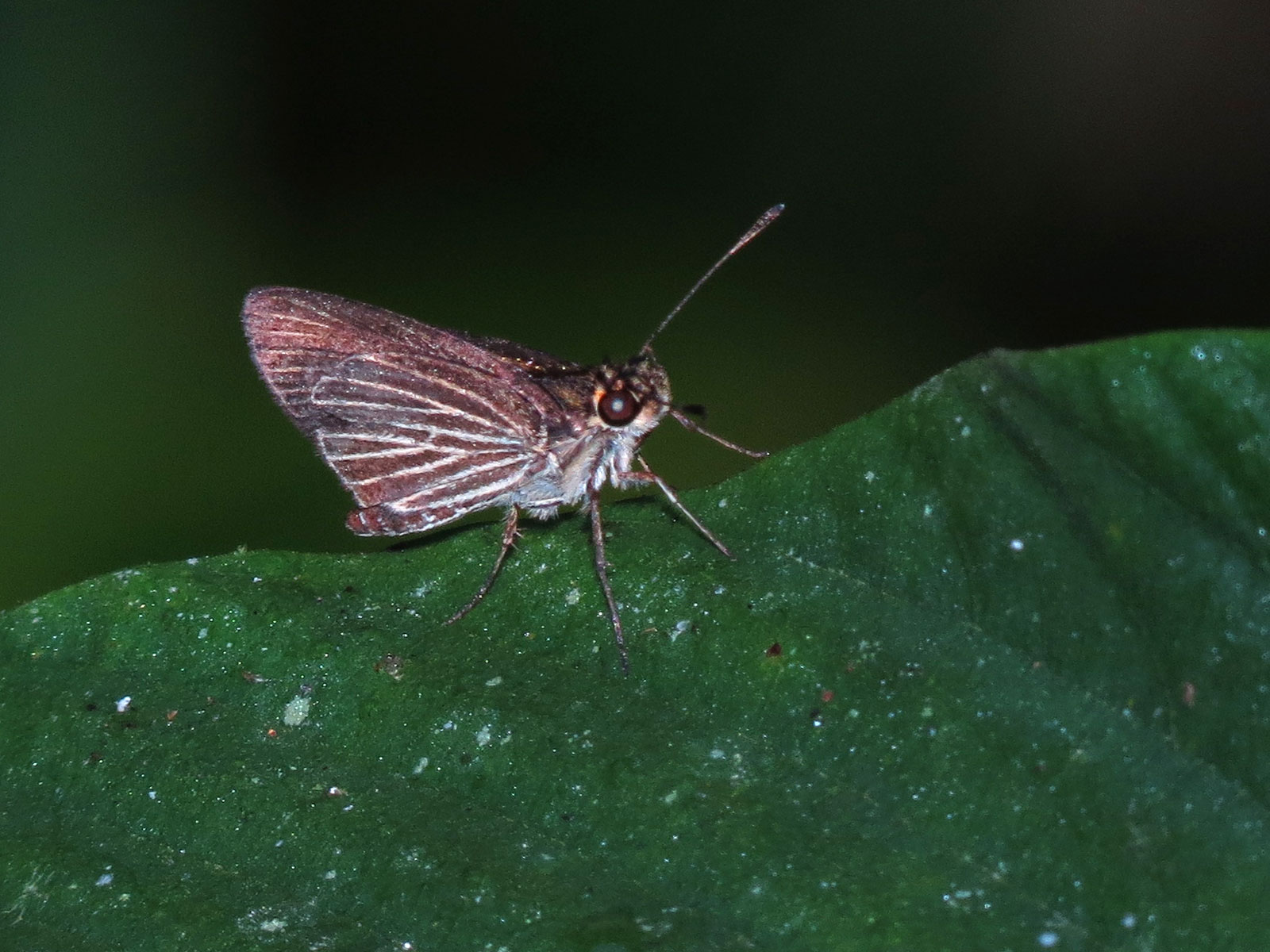

Scientific classification
- Kingdom: Animalia
- Phylum: Arthropoda
- Clade: Pancrustacea
- Class: Insecta
- Order: Lepidoptera
- Family: Hesperiidae
- Genus: Callimormus
- Species: C. radiola

Binomial name
- Callimormus radiola (Mabille, 1878)

Synonyms
- Ancyloxipha radiola Mabille, 1878

= Callimormus radiola =

Species of butterfly

Callimormus radiola, the radiant skipper, is a species of skipper butterfly in the family Hesperiidae. It is found in southern Mexico, Ecuador, Brazil, Colombia and Argentina.

== Subspecies ==
- Callimormus radiola radiola (southern Mexico to southern Brazil)
- Callimormus radiola elegans Hayward, 1938 (Ecuador)
- Callimormus radiola janna Evans, 1955 (Colombia)
- Callimormus radiola pusillus Hayward, 1934 (Argentina)
