= Ludens (skipper) =

Scientific classification
- Kingdom: Animalia
- Phylum: Arthropoda
- Class: Insecta
- Order: Lepidoptera
- Family: Hesperiidae
- Subtribe: Moncina
- Genus: Ludens; Evans, 1955

Genus of butterflies

Ludens is a genus of skippers in the family Hesperiidae.

== Species ==
Recognised species in the genus Ludens include:

- Ludens levina (Plötz, 1884)
- Ludens ludens (Mabille, 1891)
- Ludens petrovna (Schaus, 1902) – Petrovna skipper – southern Mexico to southern Brazil
