= Lucida (skipper) =

Scientific classification
- Kingdom: Animalia
- Phylum: Arthropoda
- Class: Insecta
- Order: Lepidoptera
- Family: Hesperiidae
- Subtribe: Moncina
- Genus: Lucida; Evans, 1955

Genus of butterflies

Lucida is a genus of skippers in the family Hesperiidae.

== Species ==
Recognised species in the genus Lucida include:

- Lucida leopardus Weeks, 1901
- Lucida lucia (Capronnier, 1874)
- Lucida melitaea (Draudt, 1923)
- Lucida oebasus (Godman, 1900)
- Lucida scopas (Mabille, 1891)
