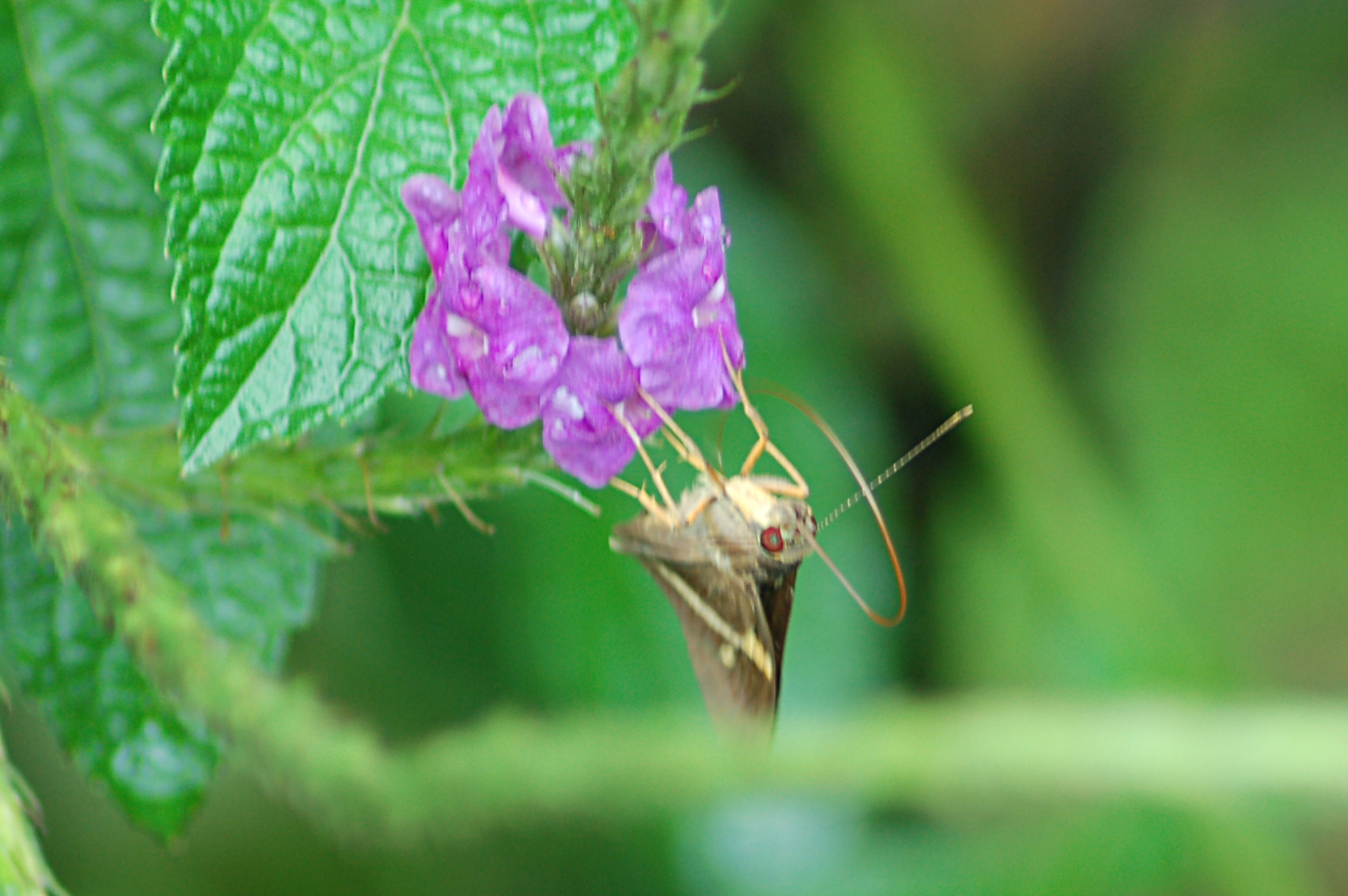
- Niconiades nikko

Scientific classification
- Kingdom: Animalia
- Phylum: Arthropoda
- Class: Insecta
- Order: Lepidoptera
- Family: Hesperiidae
- Subtribe: Moncina
- Genus: Niconiades; Hübner, [1821]

= Niconiades =

Genus of butterflies

Niconiades is a genus of skipper butterflies in the family Hesperiidae.

== Species ==
Recognised species in the genus Niconiades include:

- Niconiades comitana Freeman, 1969
- Niconiades cydia (Hewitson, 1876)
- Niconiades derisor (Mabille, 1891)
- Niconiades merenda (Mabille, 1878)
- Niconiades peri (Evans, 1955)
- Niconiades viridis (Bell, 1930)
- Niconiades xanthaphes Hübner, [1821]
