= Radiatus =

Scientific classification
- Kingdom: Animalia
- Phylum: Arthropoda
- Class: Insecta
- Order: Lepidoptera
- Family: Hesperiidae
- Subtribe: Moncina
- Genus: Radiatus; Mielke, 1968
- Species: R. radiatus

Binomial name
- Radiatus radiatus Mielke, 1968

Genus of butterflies

Radiatus is a genus of skipper butterflies in the family Hesperiidae. It has one species, Radiatus radiatus.
