= Vistigma =

Scientific classification
- Kingdom: Animalia
- Phylum: Arthropoda
- Class: Insecta
- Order: Lepidoptera
- Family: Hesperiidae
- Subtribe: Moncina
- Genus: Vistigma; Hayward, 1938

Genus of butterflies

Vistigma is a genus of skippers in the family Hesperiidae.

== Species ==
Recognised species in the genus Vistigma include:

- Vistigma bryanti (Weeks, 1906)
