= Alice Godman =

British charity worker

Dame Alice Godman DBE
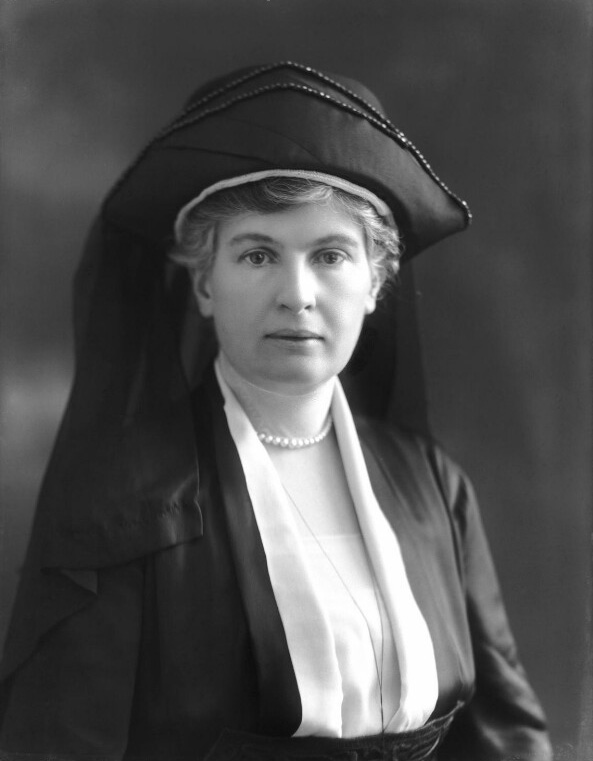
- Born: Alice Mary Chaplin; 24 June 1868
- Died: 3 October 1944 (aged 76)
- Spouse: Frederick DuCane Godman (married 1891–1919)
- Children: 2

Dame Alice Mary Godman, DBE (née Chaplin; 24 June 1868 – 3 October 1944) was a British charity worker, serving as Deputy President of the British Red Cross Society. She also had an interest in Girl Guiding and served as County Commissioner for Girl Guides in Sussex. Godman was the second wife of Frederick DuCane Godman, a noted naturalist, and accompanied him on expeditions.

The extinct Lord Howe Pigeon was described by Gregory Mathews in 1915, using a painting as a guide. At the time, he named it Raperia godmanae for Alice Mary Godman.

In the 1918 New Year Honours, Godman was made a Dame Commander of the Order of the British Empire (DBE) "for services in connection with the War", and thereby granted the title dame.

She had two daughters: Eva Mary Godman (1895–1965) and Catherine Edith Godman (1896–1982). Neither married or bore issue.
