= Inglorius =

Scientific classification
- Kingdom: Animalia
- Phylum: Arthropoda
- Clade: Pancrustacea
- Class: Insecta
- Order: Lepidoptera
- Family: Hesperiidae
- Subtribe: Moncina
- Genus: Inglorius; Austin 1997
- Species: I. mediocris

Binomial name
- Inglorius mediocris Austin, 1997

Genus of butterflies

Inglorius is a genus of skipper butterflies in the family Hesperiidae, containing only one species, the mediocre skipper (Inglorius mediocris). It is endemic to Guatemala.
