= Cantha =

Scientific classification
- Kingdom: Animalia
- Phylum: Arthropoda
- Class: Insecta
- Order: Lepidoptera
- Family: Hesperiidae
- Subtribe: Moncina
- Genus: Cantha; Evans, [1955]

Genus of butterflies

Cantha is a genus of skippers in the family Hesperiidae.

== Species ==
Recognised species in the genus Cantha include:

- Cantha calva Evans, 1955
- Cantha zara (Bell, 1941)
