= Cumbre =

Scientific classification
- Kingdom: Animalia
- Phylum: Arthropoda
- Class: Insecta
- Order: Lepidoptera
- Family: Hesperiidae
- Subtribe: Moncina
- Genus: Cumbre; Evans, [1955]

Genus of butterflies

Cumbre is a genus of skippers in the family Hesperiidae.

== Species ==
Recognised species in the genus Cumbre include:

- Cumbre cumbre (Schaus, 1902)
