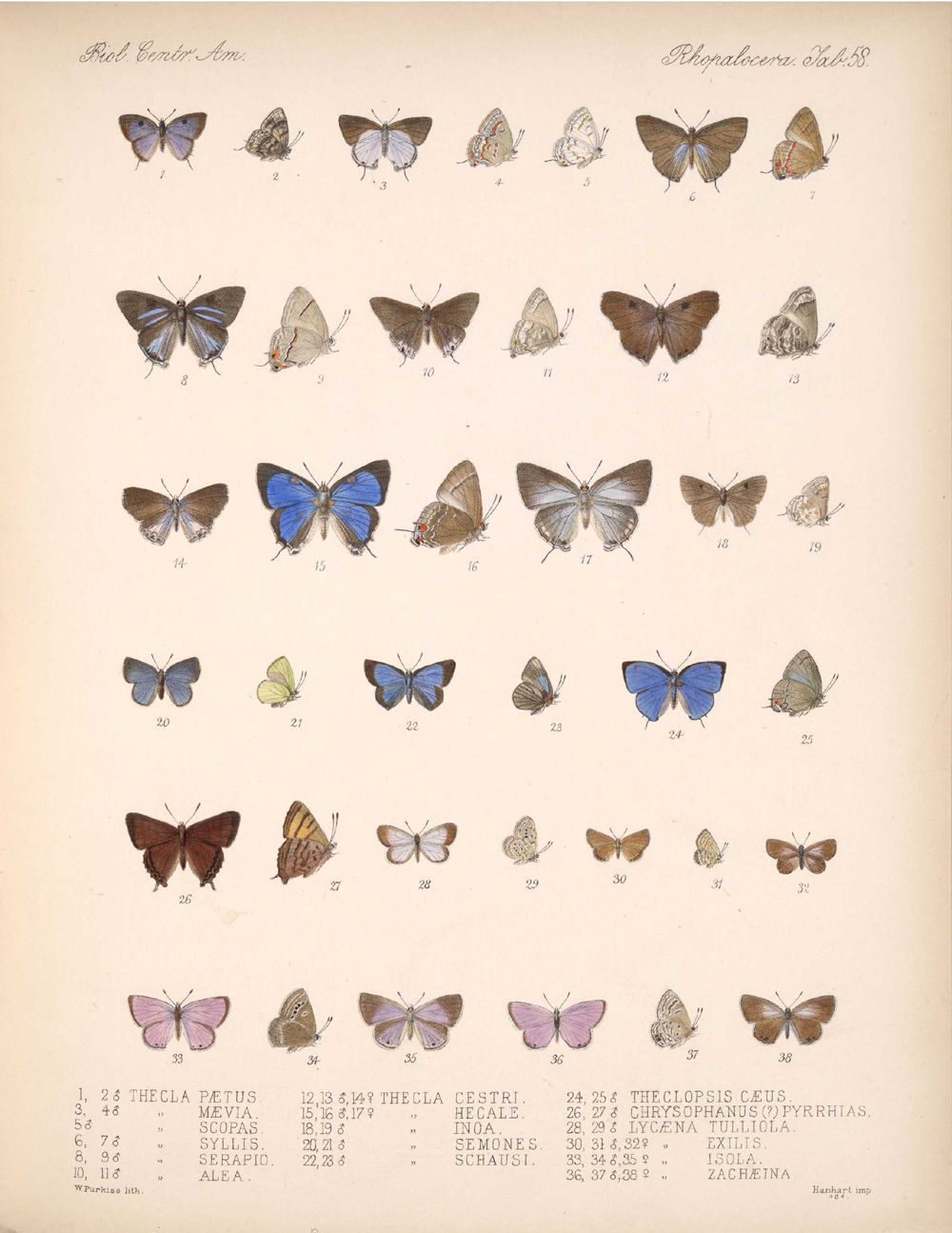
- Ipidecla schausi, figures 22 and 23

Scientific classification
- Domain: Eukaryota
- Kingdom: Animalia
- Phylum: Arthropoda
- Class: Insecta
- Order: Lepidoptera
- Family: Lycaenidae
- Tribe: Eumaeini
- Genus: Ipidecla; Dyar, 1916

= Ipidecla =

Butterfly genus in family Lycaenidae

Ipidecla is a genus of butterflies in the family Lycaenidae. The species of this genus are found in the Neotropical realm.

== Species ==
- Ipidecla miadora Dyar, 1916
- Ipidecla schausi (Godman & Salvin, [1887])
- Ipidecla crepundia (Druce, 1909)
