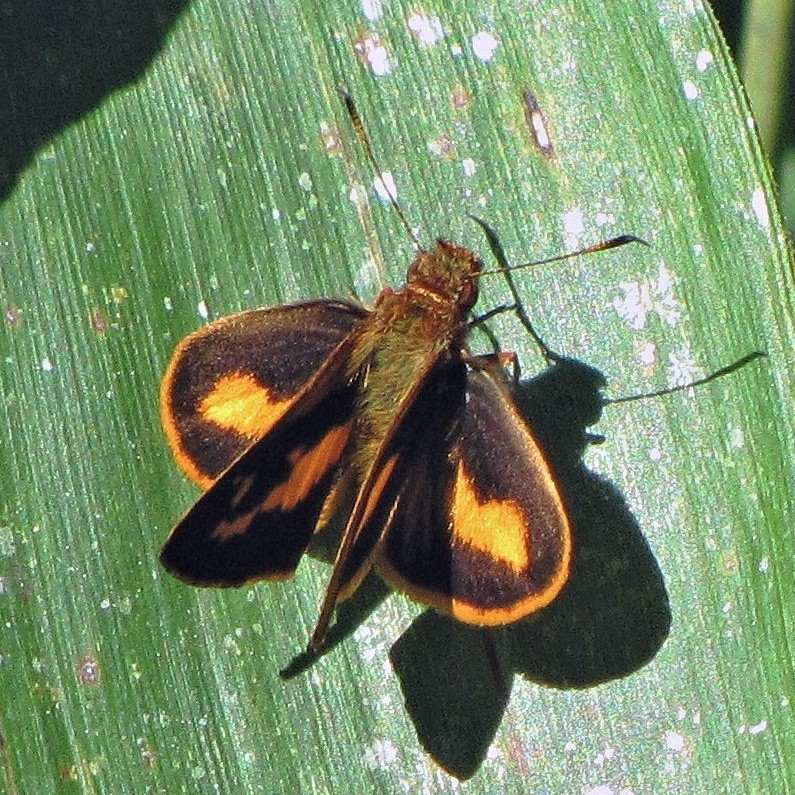
- Lento krexoides

Scientific classification
- Kingdom: Animalia
- Phylum: Arthropoda
- Clade: Pancrustacea
- Class: Insecta
- Order: Lepidoptera
- Family: Hesperiidae
- Subtribe: Moncina
- Genus: Lento; Evans, 1955

= Lento (skipper) =

Genus of butterflies

Lento is a genus of skippers in the family Hesperiidae.

== Species ==
Recognised species in the genus Lento include:

- Lento lento (Ménétriés, 1829)

=== Former species ===
- Lento vicinus (Plötz, 1884) – transferred to Corticea vicinus (Plötz, 1884)
- Lento hermione (Schaus, 1913) – transferred to Hermio hermione (Schaus, 1913)

== Sources ==
- Natural History Museum Lepidoptera genus database
