= Panca (butterfly) =

Scientific classification
- Kingdom: Animalia
- Phylum: Arthropoda
- Class: Insecta
- Order: Lepidoptera
- Family: Hesperiidae
- Subtribe: Moncina
- Genus: Panca; Evans, 1955

Genus of butterflies

Panca is a genus of skipper butterflies in the family Hesperiidae.

== Species ==
Recognised species in the genus Panca include:

- Panca moseri Dolibaina, Carneiro & O.Mielke
- Panca subpunctuli (Hayward, 1934)
