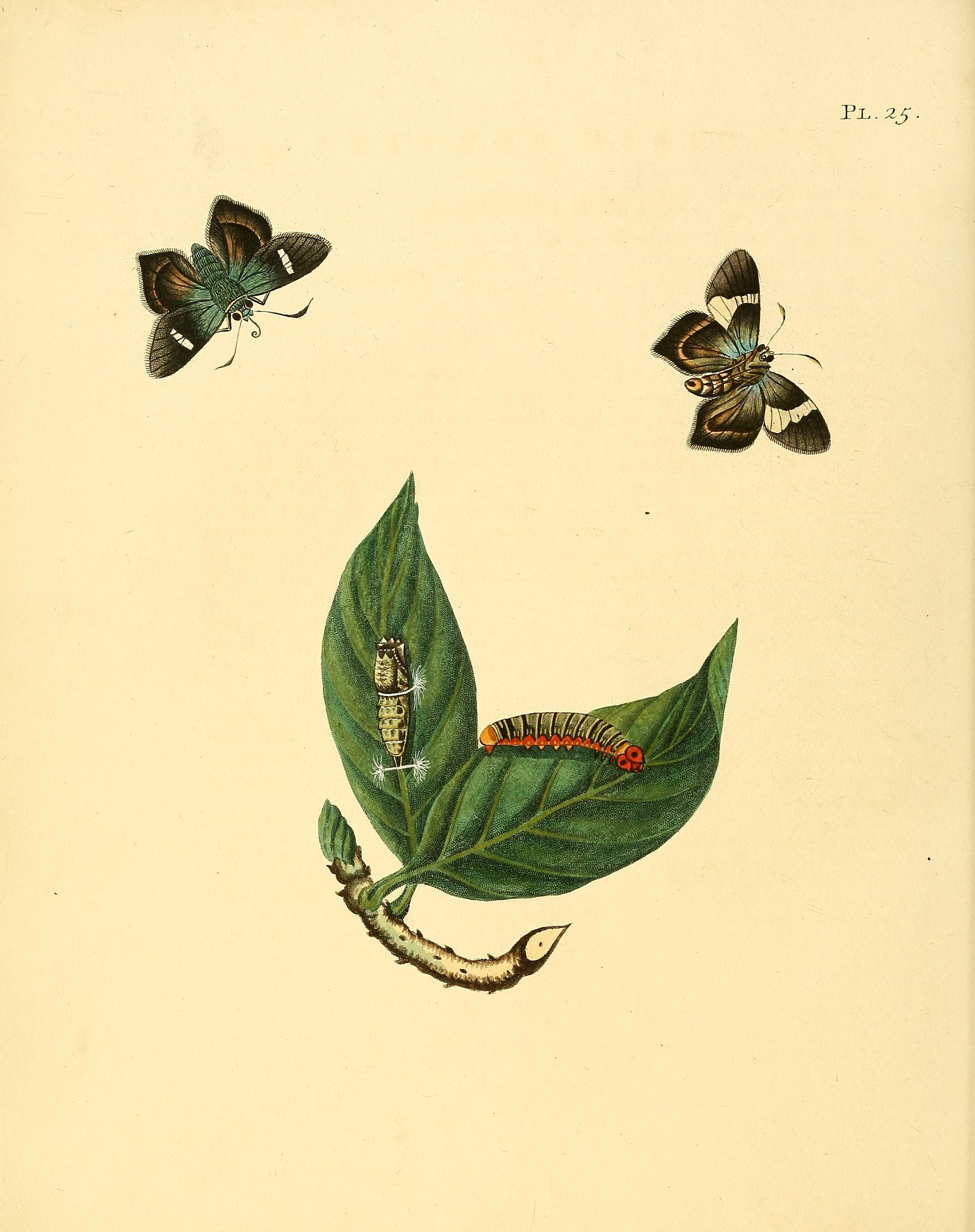
- Phlebodes pertinax

Scientific classification
- Kingdom: Animalia
- Phylum: Arthropoda
- Class: Insecta
- Order: Lepidoptera
- Family: Hesperiidae
- Subtribe: Moncina
- Genus: Phlebodes; Hübner, [1819]

= Phlebodes =

Genus of butterflies

Phlebodes is a genus of skippers in the family Hesperiidae, subfamily Hesperiinae.

== Species ==
Recognised species in the genus Phlebodes include:

- Phlebodes campo (Bell, 1947)
- Phlebodes fuldai (Bell, 1930)
- Phlebodes pertinax (Stoll, 1781)
- Phlebodes sameda (Herrich-Schäffer, 1869)

=== Former species ===
- Phlebodes chittara Schaus, 1902 - transferred to Chitta chittara (Schaus, 1902)
- Phlebodes pares Bell, 1959 - transferred to Pares pares (Bell, 1959)
- Phlebodes simplex Bell, 1930 - transferred to Tigasis simplex (Bell, 1930)
- Phlebodes storax Mabille, 1891 - transferred to Parphorus storax (Mabille, 1891)
