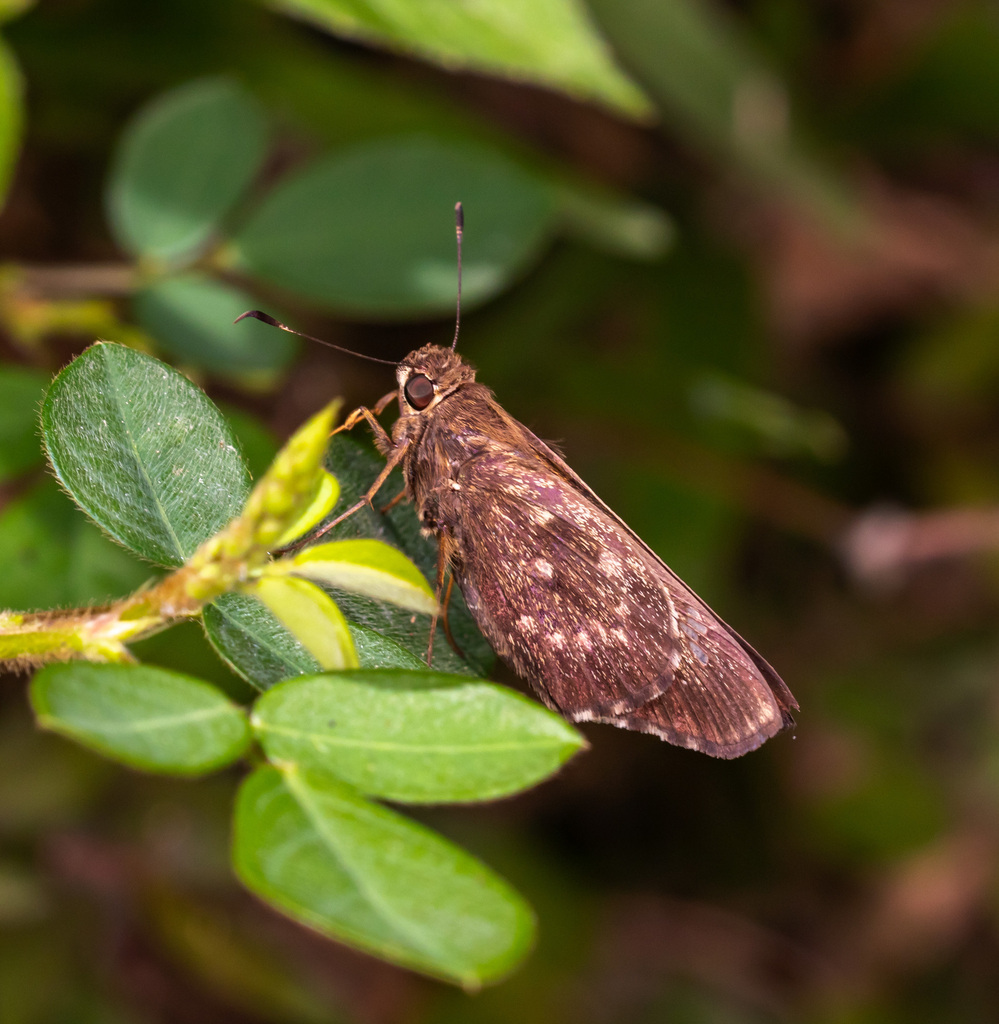

Scientific classification
- Kingdom: Animalia
- Phylum: Arthropoda
- Class: Insecta
- Order: Lepidoptera
- Family: Hesperiidae
- Subtribe: Moncina
- Genus: Naevolus; Hemming, 1939

= Naevolus =

Genus of butterflies

Naevolus is a genus of skipper butterflies in the family Hesperiidae.

== Species ==
Recognised species in the genus Naevolus include:

- Naevolus brunnescens (Hayward, 1939)
- Naevolus naevus Evans, 1955
- Naevolus orius Mabille, 1939

== Bibliography ==
- Natural History Museum Lepidoptera genus database
