= Punta punta =

Scientific classification
- Kingdom: Animalia
- Phylum: Arthropoda
- Class: Insecta
- Order: Lepidoptera
- Family: Hesperiidae
- Subtribe: Moncina
- Genus: Punta; Evans, 1955
- Species: P. punta

Binomial name
- Punta punta Evans, [1955]

Genus of butterflies

Punta punta is a species of skipper butterfly in the family Hesperiidae. It is the only species in the monotypic genus Punta.
