= Saturnus (butterfly) =

Scientific classification
- Kingdom: Animalia
- Phylum: Arthropoda
- Class: Insecta
- Order: Lepidoptera
- Family: Hesperiidae
- Subtribe: Moncina
- Genus: Saturnus; Evans, 1955

Genus of butterflies

Saturnus is a genus of skippers in the family Hesperiidae.

== Species ==
Recognised species in the genus Phlebodes include:

- Saturnus saturnus (Evans, 1955)
