= Vinpeius =

Scientific classification
- Kingdom: Animalia
- Phylum: Arthropoda
- Clade: Pancrustacea
- Class: Insecta
- Order: Lepidoptera
- Family: Hesperiidae
- Genus: Vinpeius; Austin, 1997
- Species: V. tinga

Binomial name
- Vinpeius tinga (Evans, 1955)

Genus of insects

Vinpeius is a genus of skippers in the family Hesperiidae. It has one species Vinpeius tinga.
