= Frederick DuCane Godman =

English entomologist, ornithologist (1834–1919)

Frederick DuCane Godman DCL FRS FLS FGS FRGS FES FZS MRI FRHS
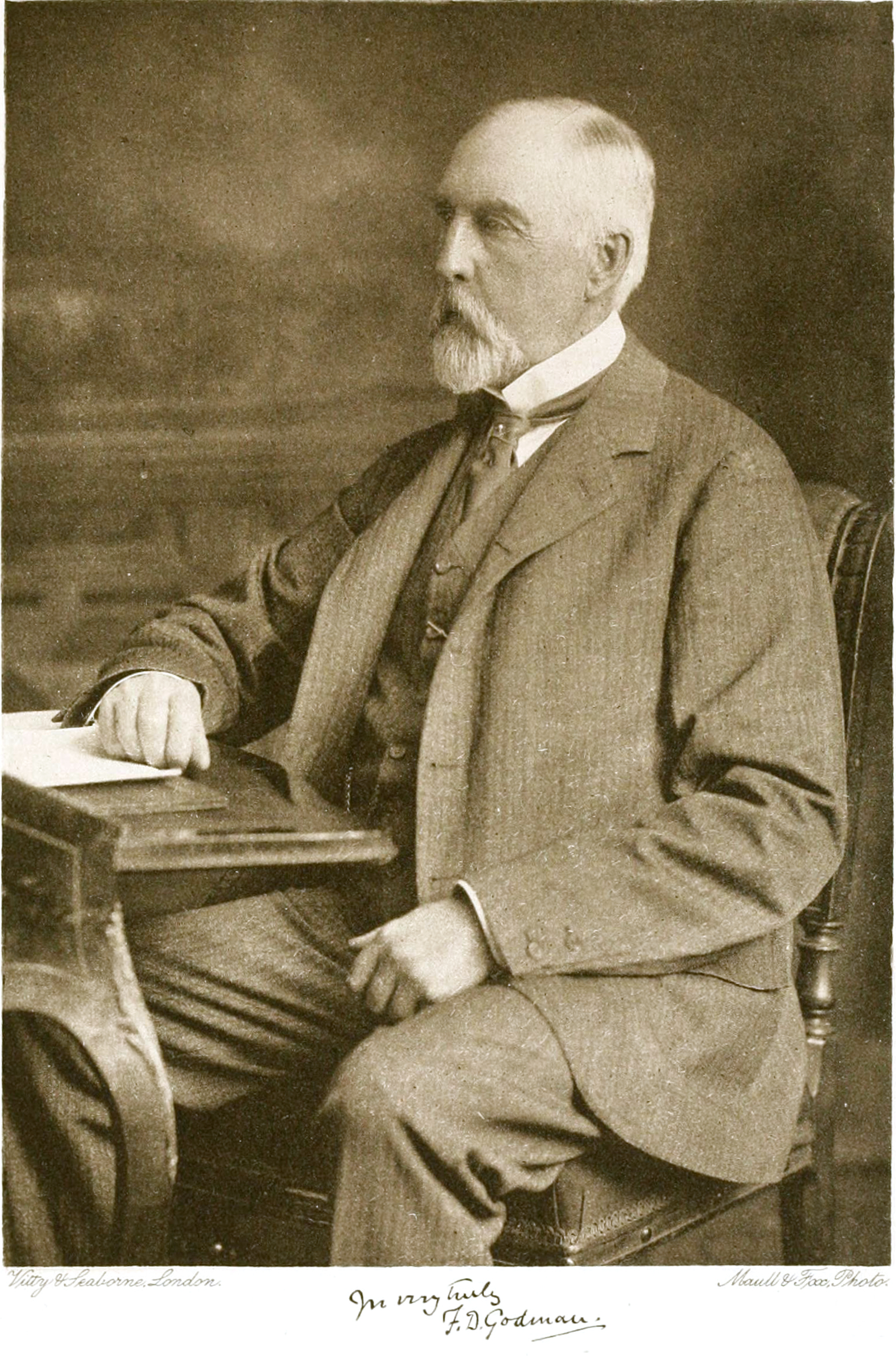
- Born: 15 January 1834; Godalming, Surrey, England
- Died: 19 February 1919 (aged 85); London, England
- Resting place: Cowfold, Sussex, England
- Education: Eton College (did not graduate); Trinity College, Cambridge
- Known for: Founding the British Ornithological Union
- Spouses: Edith Elwes (m. 1873; died 1875) Alice Mary Chaplin (m. 1891)
- Children: 2
- Awards: Linnean Medal (1918)
- Scientific career
- Fields: Lepidopterology, entomology, ornithology
- Author abbrev. (botany): Godm.

Frederick DuCane Godman DCL FRS FLS FGS FRGS FES FZS MRI FRHS (15 January 1834 – 19 February 1919) was an English lepidopterist, entomologist and ornithologist. He was one of the twenty founding members of the British Ornithologists' Union. Along with Osbert Salvin, he is remembered for studying the fauna and flora of Central America.

Godman collected Iznik, Hispano-Moresque and early Iranian pottery. His collection of more than 600 pieces was donated to the British Museum through the will of his younger daughter, Catherine, who died in 1982.

== Early life and Cambridge years ==
Frederick DuCane Godman was born on 15 January 1834 at Park Hatch, Godalming, Surrey, and was one of the thirteen children of Joseph Godman and Caroline Smith. Joseph Godman was a partner in the brewery firm Whitbread & Company. Frederick was sent to study at Eton College in 1844 but left three years later due to poor health and was educated at home by private tutors. At the age of 18 he went with his tutor on a trip around the Mediterranean and the Black Sea visiting southern Spain, Athens and Constantinople.

Godman joined Trinity College, Cambridge in 1853, where he met Alfred Newton and Osbert Salvin. Both Salvin and Godman spent time learning to skin and mount birds at Baker's taxidermy shop on the Trumpington Road. They also spent time in the field on the fens. The custom of these ornithological friends, (which included his younger brother Percy (1836–1922)), to meet and talk over their recent acquisitions led to the idea of an organisation and the foundation of the British Ornithological Union. At a meeting in Newton's room in Magdalene College on 17 November 1858, a group that included Godman, Salvin, Wilfred Simpson, John Wolley, Philip Sclater and others decided that "... an Ornithological Union of twenty members should be formed, with the object of establishing a new Journal devoted to Birds: that Lieut.-Colonel H. M. Drummond should be President, Professor Newton the Secretary of the Union, and Sclater should edit the Journal: that the title of the Journal should be The Ibis."

== Travels ==
Godman inherited a fortune from his father that allowed him to travel the world. In 1857 Godman and his brother Percy visited Bodø in northern Norway. They later published an account of their visit in the Ibis. In 1861 he joined Salvin (who was making his third trip to South America) in a trip to Guatemala and Belize via Jamaica. Godman left Salvin in Belize due to a fever and returned home via the Atlantic coast. In 1865, he made a trip to the Azores with one of his younger brothers, Captain Temple Godman (1844–1894). In 1871 he visited the Canary and Madeira Islands. He corresponded with Charles Darwin. He made many other trips later including a trip to India in 1886 with his brother-in-law Henry John Elwes. They visited Bombay, Delhi, Allan Octavian Hume at Simla, Calcutta and then travelled east to Sikkim. He purchased a collection of butterflies from Robert Lidderdale (1835–1908). During this trip he had trouble walking particularly at high altitudes. They returned through Madras and Sri Lanka. Later on he had a blood clot in the veins of his legs, leading him to move and live in the warmth of Mexico in 1885. Even here he joined Elwes on a trip up Popacatapetl.

== Life and work ==
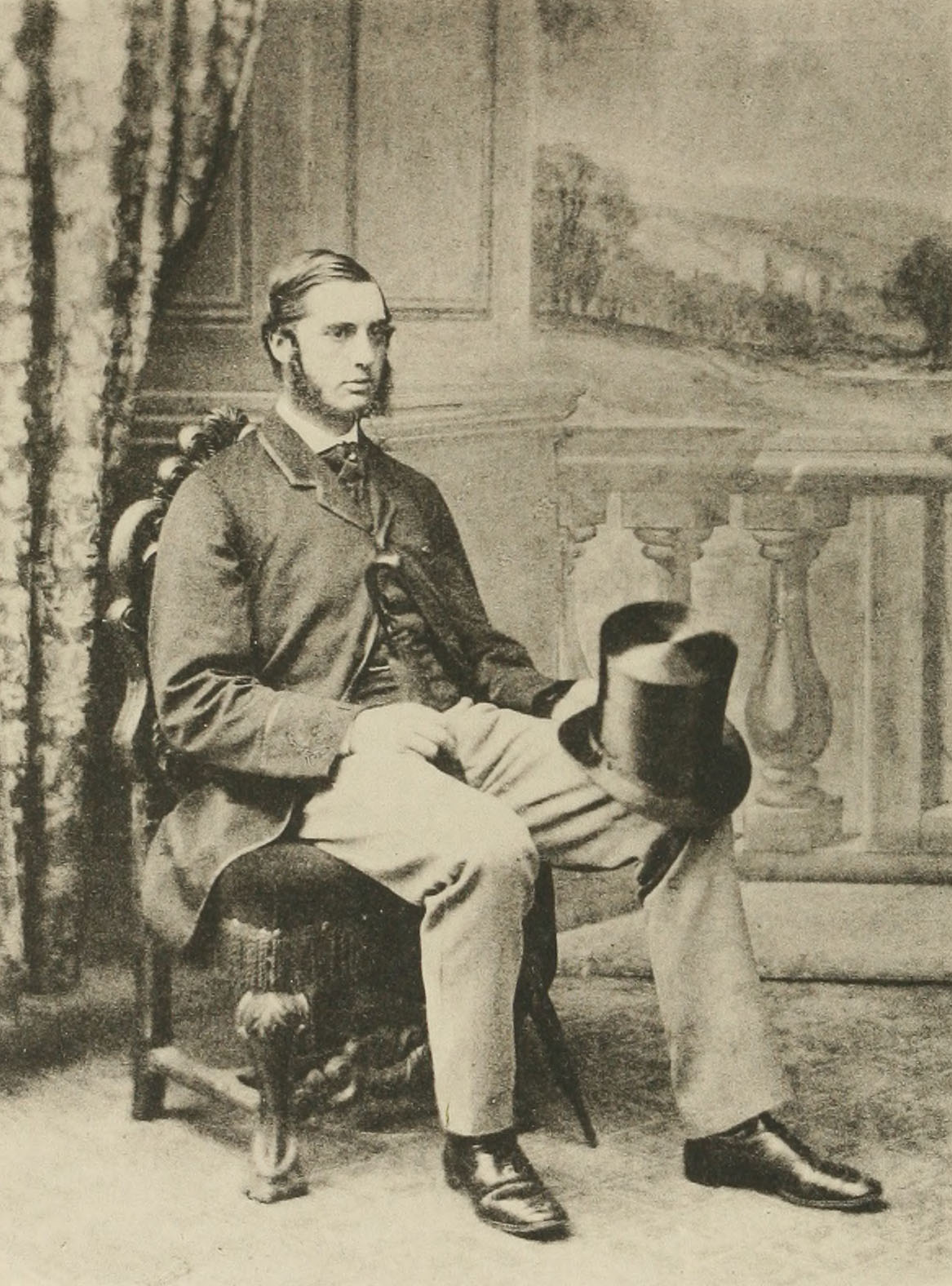
Godman as a young man

In 1876 Godman and Salvin decided to work on a project to document the fauna and flora of Central America. This monumental work Biologia Centrali-Americana (1879–1915) was to grow into a 63 volume encyclopaedia on the natural history of Central America. Some of the botanical plates were painted by Salvin's wife. Salvin did not live to see it completed. Godman relied on Salvin for much of the systematics involved. The work was made possible by a number of other collaborators including Richard Bowdler Sharpe and George Charles Champion. The associated collection was also enormous and included collections made by others such as Henry Walter Bates that were purchased. Godman and Salvin also collected numerous bird and butterfly specimens. These were presented to the British Museum in 1885, including nearly 520,000 bird skins alone. Other works by Godman included The Natural History of the Azores (1870) and a two-volume Monograph of the Petrels (1907–10) with plates by J. G. Keulemans. The British Ornithologists' Union instituted the Godman-Salvin Medal for contributions to ornithology while a memorial to Godman and Salvin was constructed and is exhibited in the Natural History Museum.

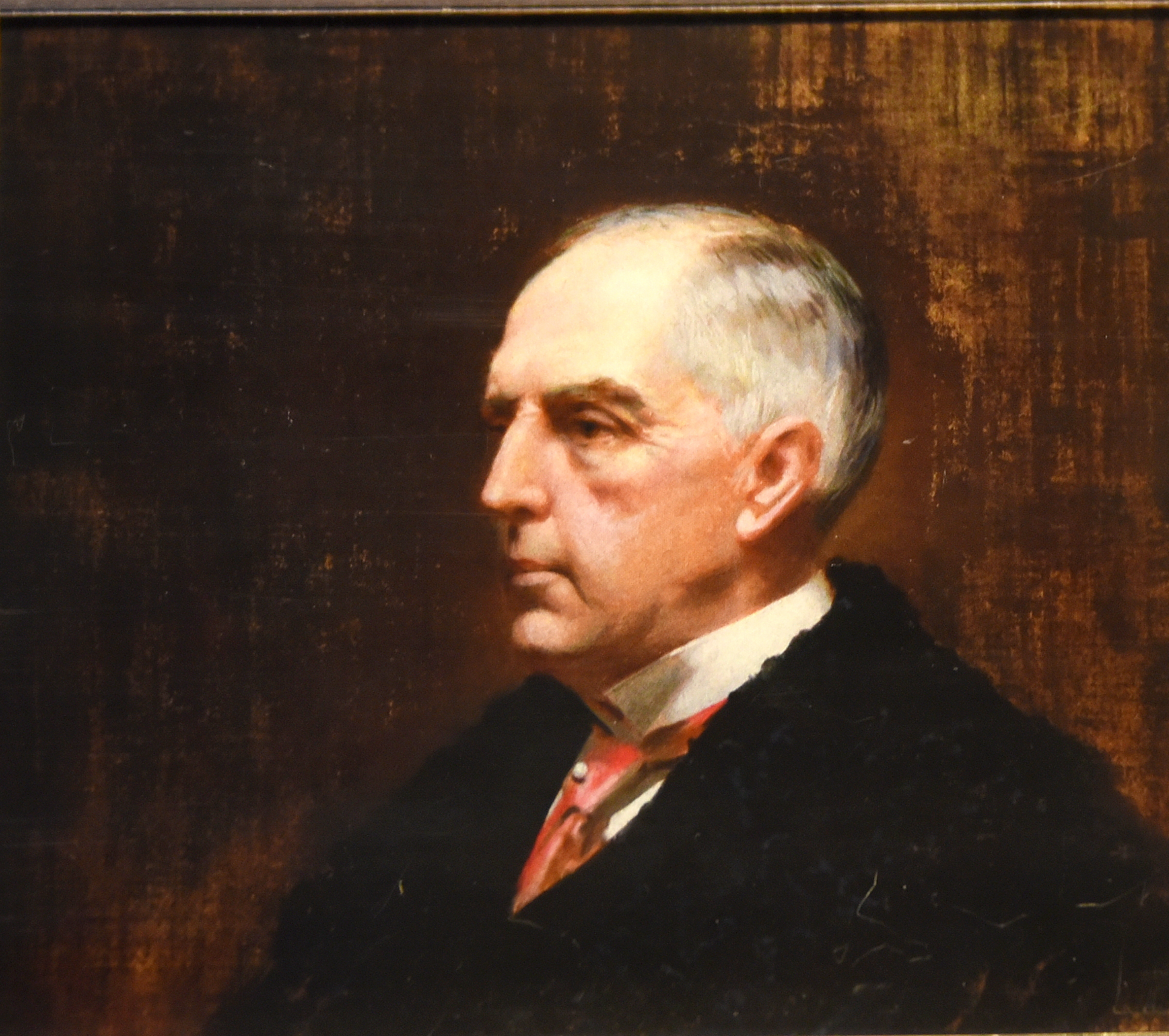
Portrait of Frederick Du Cane Godman, c. 1909, by Leon Sprinck

Godman also took an interest in plants, maintaining a large collection of rhododendrons, orchids and alpine plants in his garden and rockery at South Lodge near Horsham. This house is now the South Lodge Hotel. There appears to have been a friendly rivalry with his friend Sir Edmund Loder, a plantsman and owner of nearby Leonardslee country estate. They co-operated on loderii hybrid rhododendron, a cross between Leanardslee's Rhododendron fortunei and South Lodge's Rhododendron griffianthium. South Lodge remains notable for its rhododendrons. His other botanical passions included orchids and nerines, and with his gardener, Geoffrey Giles, he propagated rare orchids, regularly being awarded for his efforts by the Royal Horticultural Society. Along with his brother Colonel Charles Bulkeley Godman (1849–1941), he took an interest in hunting with dogs, fishing and shooting.

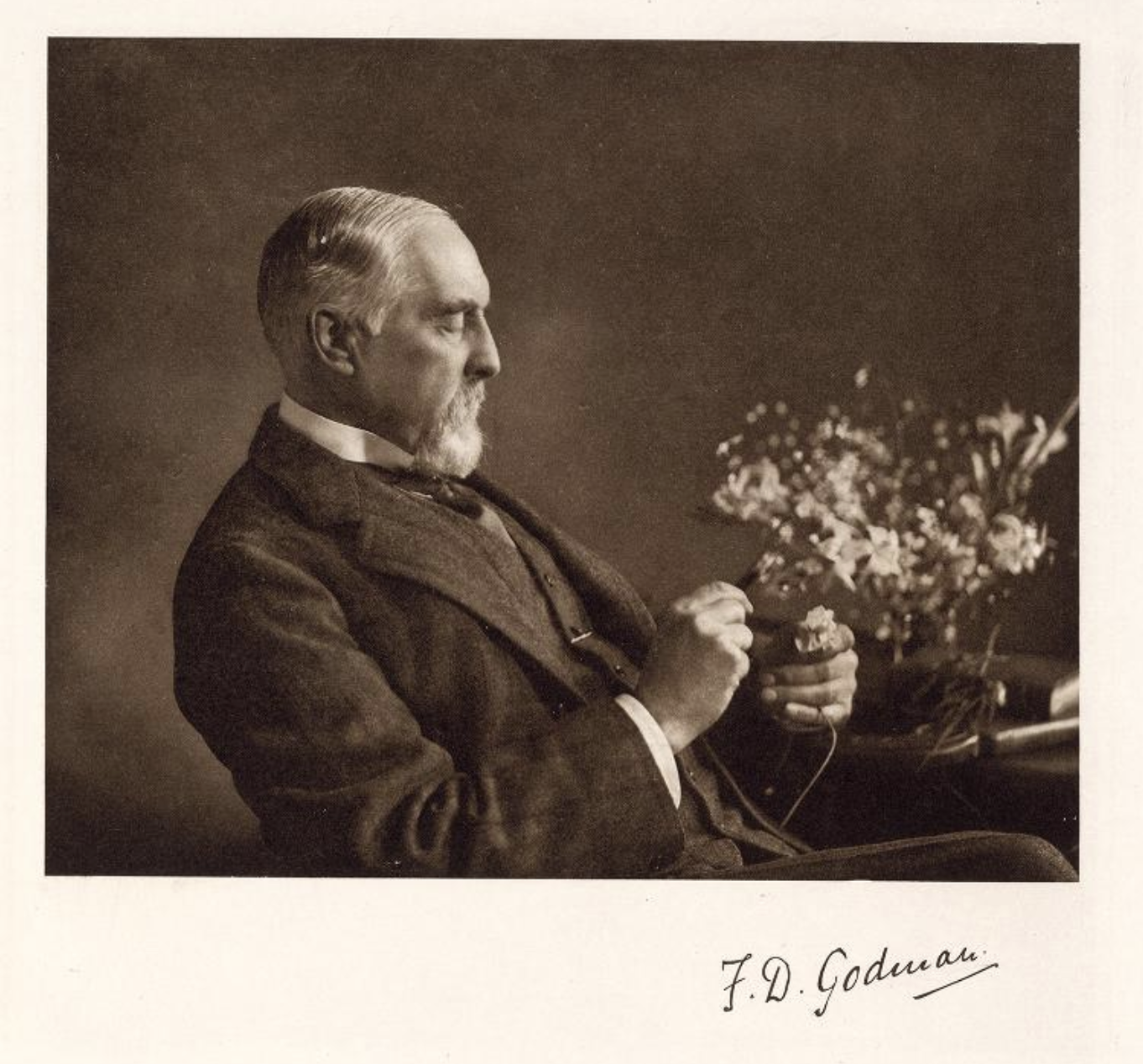
Portrait of Biologist Frederick Du Cane Godman, with signature

Godman collected early Iranian pottery, Iznik pottery and Hispano-Moresque ware. Although he had visited Istanbul in 1852, the ceramics were purchased in England. He became well known as a collector and dealers would bring items to his home near Horsham. His collection included important inscribed and dated works.

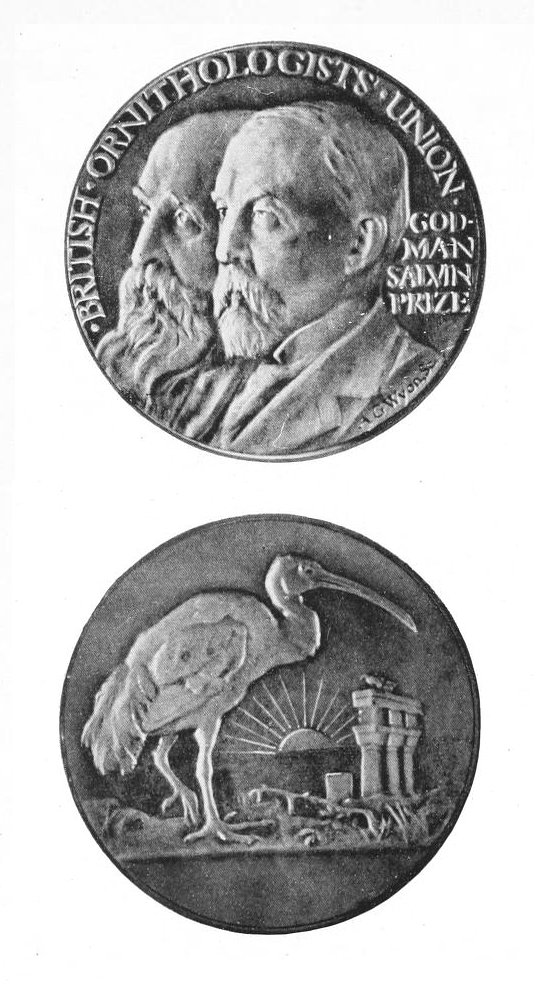
The Godman-Salvin medal was instituted in 1919, the medal was designed by Allan G. Wyon

In 1873 he married Edith, the daughter of J. H. Elwes (and hence sister of Godman's friend H. J. Elwes) and after her death in 1875 married Alice, daughter of Percy Chaplin in 1891. Along with his second wife, later Dame Alice Mary Godman (1868–1944, who became deputy president of the British Red Cross Society), he travelled to the West Indies and through Africa. He had two daughters by his second wife, Eva Mary (1895–1965) and Catherine Edith (1896–1982). Both his daughters took an interest in natural history. The elder daughter Eva was killed by a vehicle when she crossed a street to post a letter. His collection of more than 600 pieces of Islamic pottery was transferred to the British Museum through the will of his younger daughter, Catherine, who died in 1982.

Godman was secretary of the British Ornithological Union from 1870 to 1882 and again from 1889 to 1897, and also served as president from 1896 until 1913. He was a fellow of the Zoological Society of London, and member of its council from 1902. He was elected to the Royal Society in 1882, received a gold medal from the Linnean Society in 1918, and was made a trustee of the British Museum.

== Death ==
Godman died on 19 February 1919 at 45 Pont Street, London, and was laid to rest in Cowfold, Sussex.

== Legacy ==
Godman is commemorated in the scientific names of four species of reptiles: Anolis godmani (a synonym of Anolis limifrons), Cerrophidion godmani, Rhadinella godmani, Thamnophis godmani; one amphibian, Godman's tree frog (Tlalocohyla godmani); a wild silk moth (Antheraea godmani) and a heliconiine butterfly, Heliconius godmani.

== Works ==
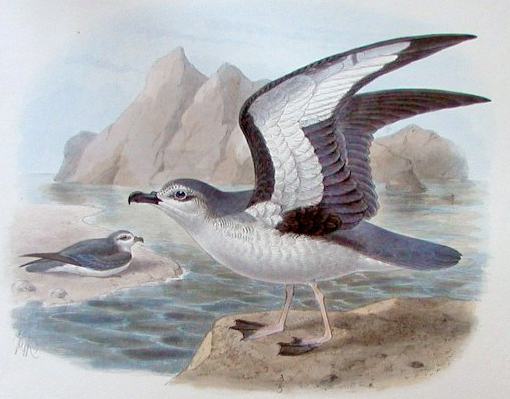
The ranguru or Chatham petrel, Pterodroma axillaris, from Godman's Monograph of the Petrels

Books

- Godman, Frederick Du Cane (1870). Natural History of the Azores, or Western Islands. London: J. Van Voorst.
- Godman, Frederick Ducane; Salvin, Osbert, eds. (1879–1915). Biologica Centrali-Americana (63 volumes). London: R. H. Porter.
- Godman, Frederick Du Cane (1901). The Godman Collection of Oriental and Spanish Pottery and Glass. 1865–1900. London: Printed for private circulation. OCLC 558743379.
- Godman, Frederick Du Cane; Keulemans, J G (illustrator) (1907–1910). A Monograph of the Petrels (Order Tubinares) (2 Volumes). London: Witherby & Co. Scans from the Internet archive: Volume 1, Volume 2.

Journal articles

Godman published 12 article on birds in the Ibis. Several of these had multiple parts and almost all were with Salvin as a co-author. He also published over 30 articles on butterflies, again mostly with Salvin.
