= List of hesperiid genera: M =

The large Lepidoptera family Hesperiidae (skippers) contains the following genera:

A B C D E F G H I J K L M N O P Q R S T U V W X Y Z

- Machachus
- Mahotis
- Malaza
- Manarina
- Marela
- Masices
- Mastor
- Metapa
- Matapoides
- Megaleas
- Megathymus
- Megistias
- Melanopyge
- Melanthes
- Mellana
- Melphina
- Mesodina
- Metardaris
- Methion
- Methionopsis
- Metiscus
- Metisella
- Metrocles
- Metrocles
- Meza
- Microceris
- Mictris
- Milanion
- Miltomiges
- Mimambrix
- Mimardaris
- Mimene
- Mimia
- Mimoniades
- Miraja
- Misius
- Mnasalcas
- Mnaseas
- Mnasicles
- Mnasilus
- Mnasinous
- Mnasitheus
- Mnestheus
- Moeris
- Moeros
- Molla
- Molo
- Moltena
- Monca
- Monza
- Mooreana
- Mopala
- Morvina
- Morys
- Motasingha
- Mucia
- Muschampia
- Mycteris
- Mylon
- Myrinia
- Mysarbia
- Myscelus
- Mysoria
