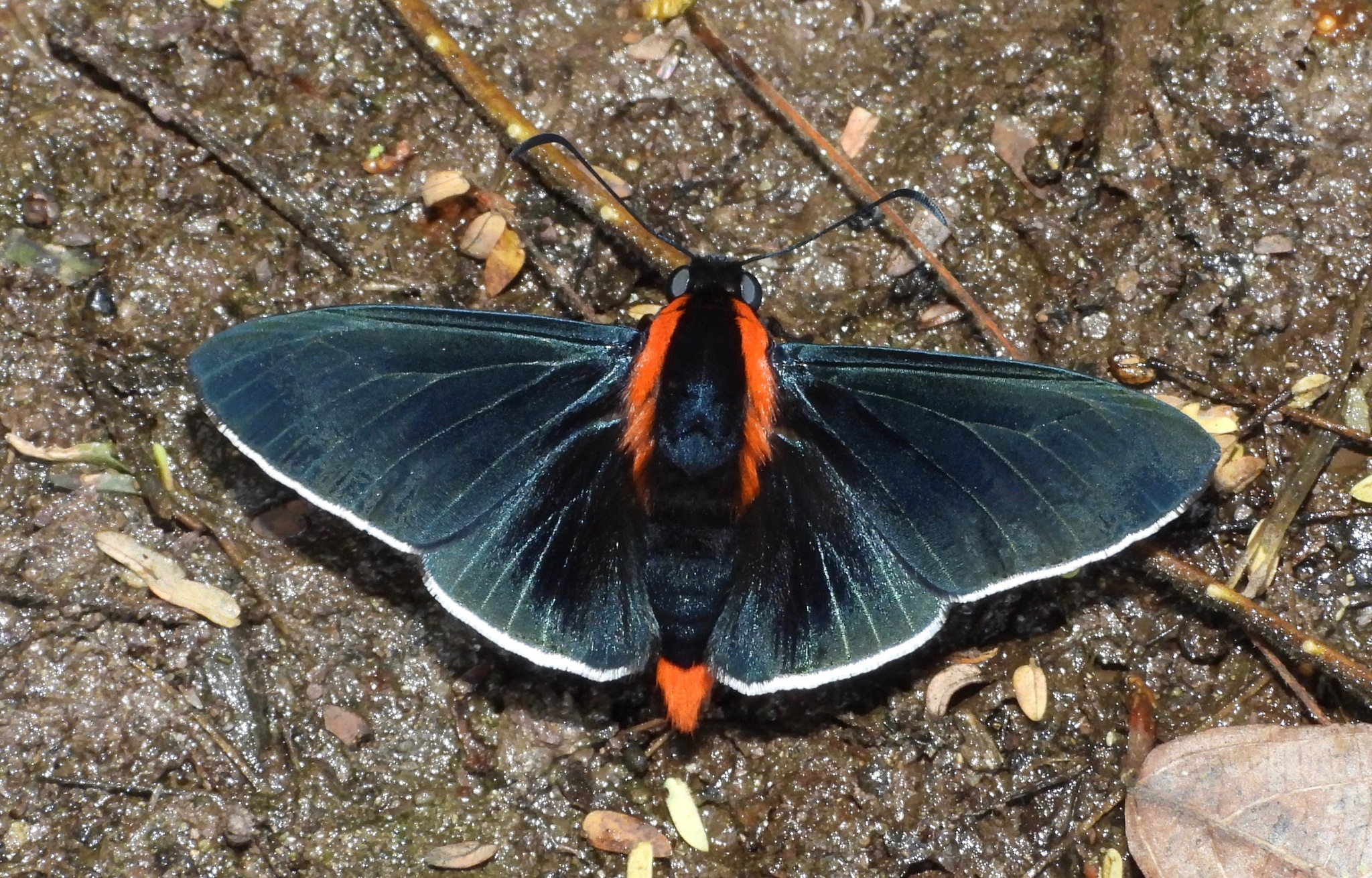
- Pyrrhopyge papius

Scientific classification
- Kingdom: Animalia
- Phylum: Arthropoda
- Clade: Pancrustacea
- Class: Insecta
- Order: Lepidoptera
- Family: Hesperiidae
- Tribe: Pyrrhopygini
- Genus: Pyrrhopyge; Hübner, [1819]

Species
- See text

= Pyrrhopyge =

Genus of butterflies

Pyrrhopyge is a Neotropical genus of firetips in the family Hesperiidae.

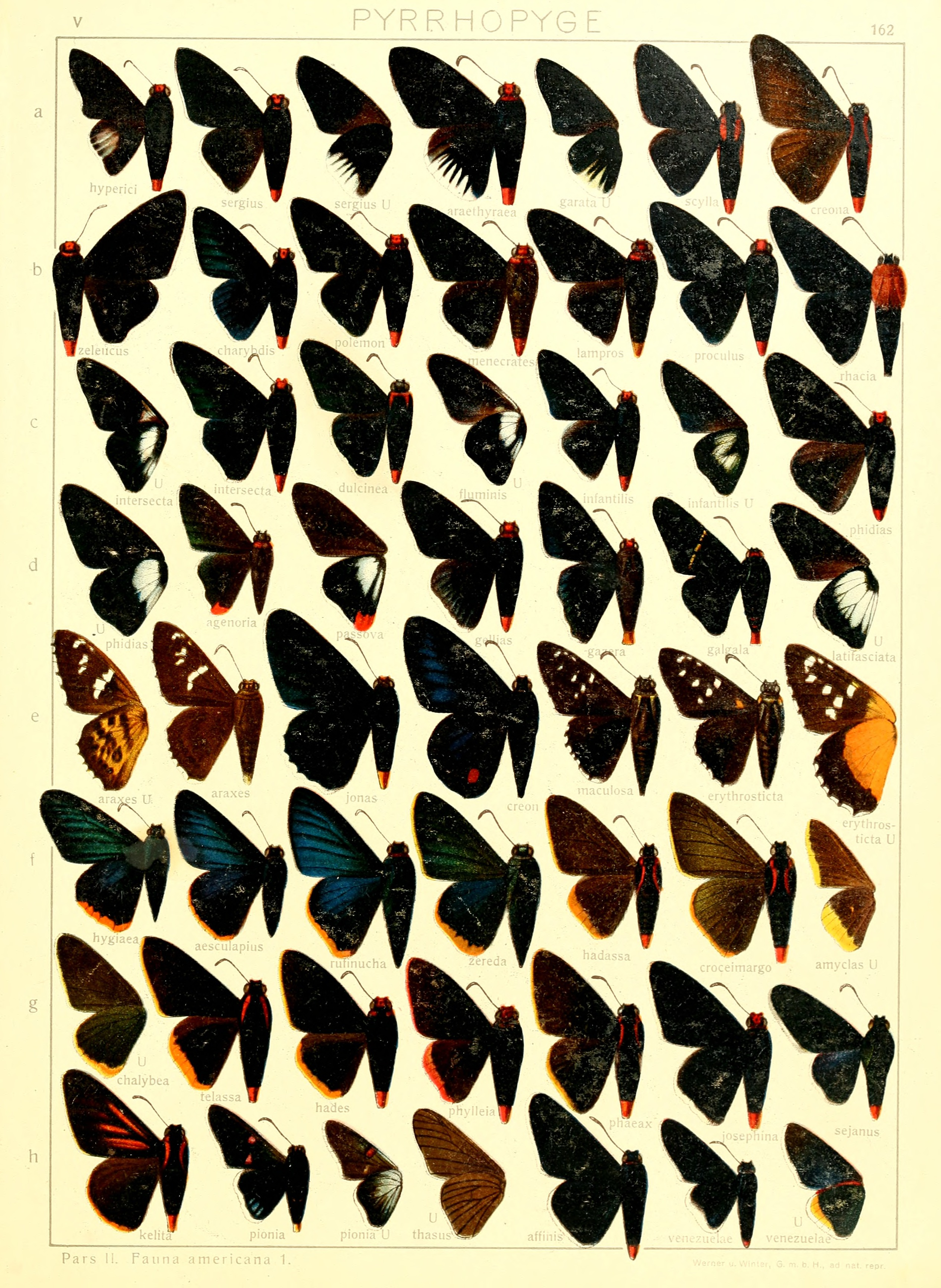
Pyrrhopyge in Adalbert Seitz's Macrolepidoptera of the World

This genus comprises very numerous, partly extremely similar species which are difficult to separate and perhaps neither are separable as distinct species. Nearly all are large, strong animals with black body and wings, often with a bronze-green or deep blue lustre, often spotted red on the head and abdomen. On the broad, mostly pointed forewings the discoidal runs very obliquely, the upper median vein rising somewhat behind the middle of the cell. On the hindwing the lower radial and upper median vein rise unpetioled, the middle radial being absent. The hind tibiae are strongly haired outside. The Pyrrhopyge, according to statements by Adalbert Seitz, are conspicuous animals owing to their almost invariably one-coloured black colouring and the mostly glaring-red ends of their bodies. When they fly past swiftly, these red places are difficult to notice for the human eye, but the resting insect makes the impression as if its body were bleeding in front and behind. As the flight is impetuously swift, the animal escaping its enemies scarcely needs any protection, whereas on the topmost branches of bushes of 1 or 2 metres height, which are chosen by the males as their point of observation, one of the most dangerous enemies of the tropical butterflies is lying in ambush, the praying-cricket which even catches butterflies of the size of strong Papilio with a sure dart and is able to devour several large specimens a day. In the waiting attitude taken up by the Pyrrhopyge on the tip of the twig, the forewings are half erected, the hindwings somewhat more lowered; a position sometimes met with in European Adopaea or Pamphila, whereas other Pyrrhopyginae, such as the blue-striped Jemadia, the Mimoniades, Myscelus etc. keep their wings spread out when at rest, about like Thanaos tages. The larvae of Pyrrhopyge, as far as we know, are thinly haired on the body, shaggily on the head, brown or reddish with yellow, zebra-like stripes. They live on different trees, so on guava pear-trees (Psidium pyriferum and pomiferum), in leaf-cases. The pupae are haired, too. The imagines fly along the roads and skirts of woods in a raving, somewhat skipping flight and are fond of drinking from wet places on the roads. The Jemadia and Mimoniades love the umbels of blossoming bushes, where they are met with in the company of similarly coloured hesperids from other groups, such as Phocides and Pyrrhopygopsis.

== Species ==
- Pyrrhopyge zenodorus Godman & Salvin, 1893 – red-headed firetip – southeast Mexico to Costa Rica
- Pyrrhopyge evansi E. Bell, 1947 – Evans' firetip – type locality Colombia
  - Pyrrhopyge evansi evansi E. Bell, 1947 Costa Rica, Panama, Colombia, Venezuela, French Guiana, Ecuador
  - Pyrrhopyge evansi borburata Orellana, [2010] Venezuela
- Pyrrhopyge phidias (Linnaeus, 1758) – original firetip – type locality "Asia"
  - Pyrrhopyge phidias phidias (Linnaeus, 1758) Trinidad, Suriname, Guyana, Venezuela, Colombia, Peru, Bolivia, Paraguay, Brazil
  - Pyrrhopyge phidias hyperici Hübner, 1823 Brazil
  - Pyrrhopyge phidias latifasciata A. Butler, 1873 Colombia
  - Pyrrhopyge phidias bixae (Linnaeus, 1758) Suriname, French Guiana, north Brazil to Matto Grosso
  - Pyrrhopyge phidias rusca Evans, 1951 Ecuador, Peru, southwest Brazil
  - Pyrrhopyge phidias leucoloma Erschoff, 1875 Peru, Bolivia
  - Pyrrhopyge phidias garata Hewitson, 1866 Guyana, Suriname, [Venezuela?]
  - Pyrrhopyge phidias guianae E. Bell, 1932 Trinidad, Guyana, French Guiana
- Pyrrhopyge aziza Hewitson, 1866 – aziza firetip – type locality Colombia
  - Pyrrhopyge aziza aziza Hewitson, 1866 Colombia
  - Pyrrhopyge aziza lexos Evans, 1951 Guyana, Colombia, Ecuador, Peru
  - Pyrrhopyge aziza araethyrea Hewitson, 1870 Ecuador
  - Pyrrhopyge aziza troja Evans, 1951 Peru, Bolivia
  - Pyrrhopyge aziza arbor Evans, 1951 Colombia, Venezuela
  - Pyrrhopyge aziza attis E. Bell, 1931 Bolivia
  - Pyrrhopyge aziza subnubilus Hayward, 1935 Argentina
- Pyrrhopyge pusca Evans, 1951 – Pusca firetip – Peru, Bolivia
- Pyrrhopyge proculus Hopffer, 1874 – Proculus firetip – type locality Guyana
  - Pyrrhopyge proculus proculus Hopffer, 1874 Trinidad, Guyana, Venezuela, Colombia, north Brazil
  - Pyrrhopyge proculus lina E. Bell, 1947 north Brazil
  - Pyrrhopyge proculus cardus Mabille, 1891 north Brazil
  - Pyrrhopyge proculus hyleus Mabille, 1891 north Brazil
  - Pyrrhopyge proculus cintra Evans, 1951 French Guiana, Suriname, Guyana, north Brazil, northeast Peru
  - Pyrrhopyge proculus draudti E. Bell, 1931 Venezuela, Colombia, Ecuador, Peru, Bolivia
- Pyrrhopyge infantilis H. Druce, 1908 – infant firetip – type locality Peru
  - Pyrrhopyge infantilis infantilis H. Druce, 1908 Peru, Bolivia
  - Pyrrhopyge infantilis agala Evans, 1951 Bolivia
- Pyrrhopyge thericles Mabille, 1891 – impostor firetip – type locality Brazil
  - Pyrrhopyge thericles thericles Mabille, 1891 northeast Brazil
  - Pyrrhopyge thericles orientis E. Bell, 1947 north Brazil
  - Pyrrhopyge thericles ponicia Evans, 1951 French Guiana, Suriname, north Brazil
  - Pyrrhopyge thericles pseudophidias E. Bell, 1931 Costa Rica, Panama, Venezuela, Colombia, Ecuador, Peru, north Brazil
  - Pyrrhopyge thericles raymondi Orellana, [2010] Venezuela
  - Pyrrhopyge thericles fola Evans, 1951 Colombia, southwest Venezuela
  - Pyrrhopyge thericles rileyi E. Bell, 1931 Ecuador, Bolivia
  - Pyrrhopyge thericles grinda Evans, 1953 Guyana
  - Pyrrhopyge thericles ronda Evans, 1953 Trinidad
- Pyrrhopyge amythaon E. Bell, 1931 – Amythaon firetip – type locality Brazil
  - Pyrrhopyge amythaon amythaon E. Bell, 1931 Brazil
  - Pyrrhopyge amythaon gradens Evans, 1951 north Brazil
  - Pyrrhopyge amythaon peron E. Bell, 1947 Venezuela, Colombia, northeast Peru
  - Pyrrhopyge amythaon polka Evans, 1951 French Guiana
  - Pyrrhopyge amythaon perula Evans, 1951 Peru, Bolivia
  - Pyrrhopyge amythaon orino Evans, 1951 Colombia, Venezuela, Guyana
  - Pyrrhopyge amythaon pollio Evans, 1951 Peru
  - Pyrrhopyge amythaon podina Evans, 1951 Peru, Bolivia
- Pyrrhopyge sergius Hopffer, 1874 – Sergius firetip – type locality Peru
  - Pyrrhopyge sergius sergius Hopffer, 1874 Peru
  - Pyrrhopyge sergius selina Evans, 1951 Brazil
  - Pyrrhopyge sergius andros Evans, 1951 Colombia, Venezuela (Amazonas)
  - Pyrrhopyge sergius andronicus E. Bell, 1931 Ecuador, Peru, Bolivia
  - Pyrrhopyge sergius semana Evans, 1951 Suriname, French Guiana
  - Pyrrhopyge sergius ganus E. Bell, 1947 Guyana, Venezuela, [Colombia, Ecuador, Peru, [Brazil?]
  - Pyrrhopyge sergius josephina Draudt, 1921 Peru, Bolivia
- Pyrrhopyge caribe Orellana, [2010] – Caribbean firetip – type locality Venezuela
  - Pyrrhopyge caribe caribe Orellana, [2010] Venezuela
  - Pyrrhopyge caribe camachoi Orellana, [2010] Venezuela
- Pyrrhopyge erazoae Orellana, [2010] – Erazo's firetip – Venezuela
- Pyrrhopyge charybdis Westwood, 1852 – Charybdis firetip – type locality [Brazil]
  - Pyrrhopyge charybdis charybdis Westwood, 1852 south Brazil
  - Pyrrhopyge charybdis semita Evans, 1951 Bolivia, south Brazil
- Pyrrhopyge cressoni E. Bell, 1932 – Cresson's firetip – Ecuador, Bolivia
- Pyrrhopyge pelota Plötz, 1879 – pelota firetip – Bolivia, Paraguay, south Brazil
- Pyrrhopyge amyclas (Cramer, 1779) – yellow-edged firetip – type locality Suriname
  - Pyrrhopyge amyclas amyclas (Cramer, 1779) Trinidad, Venezuela, Guyana, Suriname, French Guiana, Brazil
- Pyrrhopyge phylleia Hewitson, 1874 – orange-edged firetip – type locality Bolivia
  - Pyrrhopyge phylleia phylleia Hewitson, 1874 south Peru, Bolivia
  - Pyrrhopyge phylleia delos Evans, 1951
- Pyrrhopyge arax Evans, 1951 – Arax firetip – south east Peru, Bolivia
- Pyrrhopyge haemon Godman & Salvin, 1893 – tawny-rimmed firetip – Costa Rica
- Pyrrhopyge punctata Röber, 1925 – Songo firetip – Bolivia
- Pyrrhopyge papius Hopffer, 1874 – papius firetip – type locality Colombia; Bolivia
  - Pyrrhopyge papius papius Hopffer, 1874 Venezuela, Colombia, Ecuador, Peru
  - Pyrrhopyge papius pasca Evans, 1951 Colombia
- Pyrrhopyge frona Evans, 1951 – Inca firetip – Peru
- Pyrrhopyge melanomerus Mabille & Boullet, 1908 – melanomerus firetip – type locality Bolivia
  - Pyrrhopyge melanomerus melanomerus Mabille & Boullet, 1908 Peru, Bolivia
  - Pyrrhopyge melanomerus patma Evans, 1951 south Ecuador, northeast Peru
- Pyrrhopyge decipiens Mabille, 1903 – red-spotted firetip – [Ecuador?], Peru, Bolivia
- Pyrrhopyge placeta Evans, 1951 – placeta firetip – Brazil
- Pyrrhopyge hadassa Hewitson, 1866 – Hadassa firetip – type locality [Ecuador]
  - Pyrrhopyge hadassa hadassa Hewitson, 1866 Colombia, Ecuador, Peru
  - Pyrrhopyge hadassa henna Evans, 1951 Peru
  - Pyrrhopyge hadassa hanga Evans, 1951 Peru
  - Pyrrhopyge hadassa pseudohadassa Mabille & Boullet, 1908 Peru
  - Pyrrhopyge hadassa halma Evans, 1951 Peru, Bolivia
- Pyrrhopyge terra Evans, 1951 – terra firetip – Bolivia
- Pyrrhopyge telassina Staudinger, 1888 – telassina firetip – type locality Peru; Bolivia
  - Pyrrhopyge telassina telassina Staudinger, 1888 Peru
  - Pyrrhopyge telassina tagra Evans, 1951 Peru
  - Pyrrhopyge telassina shiva Evans, 1951 southeast Peru, Bolivia
- Pyrrhopyge telassa Hewitson, 1866 – telassa firetip – type locality [Ecuador]
  - Pyrrhopyge telassa telassa Hewitson, 1866 Ecuador
  - Pyrrhopyge telassa phaeax Hopffer, 1874 Peru
  - Pyrrhopyge telassa silex Evans, 1951 Peru
  - Pyrrhopyge telassa croceimargo Mabille & Boullet, 1908 south Peru, Bolivia
- Pyrrhopyge martena Hewitson, [1869] – Martena firetip – Ecuador
- Pyrrhopyge schausi E. Bell, 1931 – Schaus' firetip – Colombia, Ecuador, north Peru
- Pyrrhopyge sadia Evans, 1951 – Sadia firetip – Ecuador, Peru
- Pyrrhopyge creona H. Druce, 1874 – creona firetip – Peru, Brazil (Amazonas)
- Pyrrhopyge kelita Hewitson, [1869] – streaked firetip – southeast Peru, Bolivia
- Pyrrhopyge crista Evans, 1951 – Crista firetip – Bolivia
- Pyrrhopyge crida Hewitson, 1871 – white-banded firetip – south east Mexico to Colombia and Ecuador
- Pyrrhopyge mopsus (E. Bell, 1931) – Mopsus firetip – Peru
- Pyrrhopyge sarpedon (E. Bell, 1931) – Sarpedon firetip – Peru (Amazonas)
- Pyrrhopyge arinas (Cramer, 1777) – Arinas firetip – type locality Suriname
  - Pyrrhopyge arinas arinas (Cramer, 1777) French Guiana, Suriname, north Brazil, northeast Peru
  - Pyrrhopyge arinas temenos (E. Bell, 1931) Peru
- Pyrrhopyge creusae (E. Bell, 1931) – Creusae firetip – French Guiana
- Pyrrhopyge tatei (E. Bell, 1932) – Tate's firetip – Venezuela
- Pyrrhopyge boulleti Le Cerf, 1922 – Boullet's firetip – Colombia, Venezuela
