= Fresna =

Scientific classification
- Kingdom: Animalia
- Phylum: Arthropoda
- Class: Insecta
- Order: Lepidoptera
- Family: Hesperiidae
- Tribe: Astictopterini
- Genus: Fresna; Evans, 1937

Genus of butterflies

Fresna is a genus of skippers in the family Hesperiidae. They are commonly known as Acraea skippers.

== Species ==
- Fresna carlo Evans, 1937
- Fresna cojo (Karsch, 1893)
- Fresna jacquelinae Collins & Larsen, 2003
- Fresna maesseni Miller, 1971
- Fresna netopha (Hewitson, 1878)
- Fresna nyassae (Hewitson, 1878)

For the following, see Grishin, 2023

- Meza larea (Neave, 1910)
- Meza leucophaea (Holland, 1894)
- Meza mabea (Holland, 1894)
