= Meza indusiata =

Scientific classification
- Domain: Eukaryota
- Kingdom: Animalia
- Phylum: Arthropoda
- Class: Insecta
- Order: Lepidoptera
- Family: Hesperiidae
- Genus: Meza
- Species: M. indusiata

Binomial name
- Meza indusiata (Mabille, 1891)

Synonyms
- Hypoleucis indusiata Mabille, 1891; Acleros kasai Druce, 1909; Acleros kasai ab. dualensis Strand, 1914

Species of butterfly

Meza indusiata, the snowy missile, is a butterfly in the family Hesperiidae. It is found in Senegal, Guinea-Bissau, Sierra Leone, Liberia, Ivory Coast, Ghana, Nigeria, Cameroon, Gabon, the Republic of the Congo, Angola, the Democratic Republic of the Congo and Uganda. The habitat consists of forests.

The larvae feed on Hugonia platysepala.
