= Fresna carlo =

Scientific classification
- Kingdom: Animalia
- Phylum: Arthropoda
- Class: Insecta
- Order: Lepidoptera
- Family: Hesperiidae
- Genus: Fresna
- Species: F. carlo

Binomial name
- Fresna carlo Evans, 1937

Species of butterfly

Fresna carlo, commonly known as Evans' Acraea skipper, is a species of butterfly in the family Hesperiidae. It is found in Sierra Leone, Ivory Coast, Ghana, Cameroon, the Republic of the Congo, the Central African Republic, the Democratic Republic of the Congo, western Uganda and possibly Nigeria. The habitat consists of forests.

Adult males are attracted to bird droppings.
