= Meza gardineri =

Scientific classification
- Domain: Eukaryota
- Kingdom: Animalia
- Phylum: Arthropoda
- Class: Insecta
- Order: Lepidoptera
- Family: Hesperiidae
- Genus: Meza
- Species: M. gardineri

Binomial name
- Meza gardineri Collins & Larsen, 2008

Species of butterfly

Meza gardineri is a butterfly in the family Hesperiidae. It is found in Zambia.
