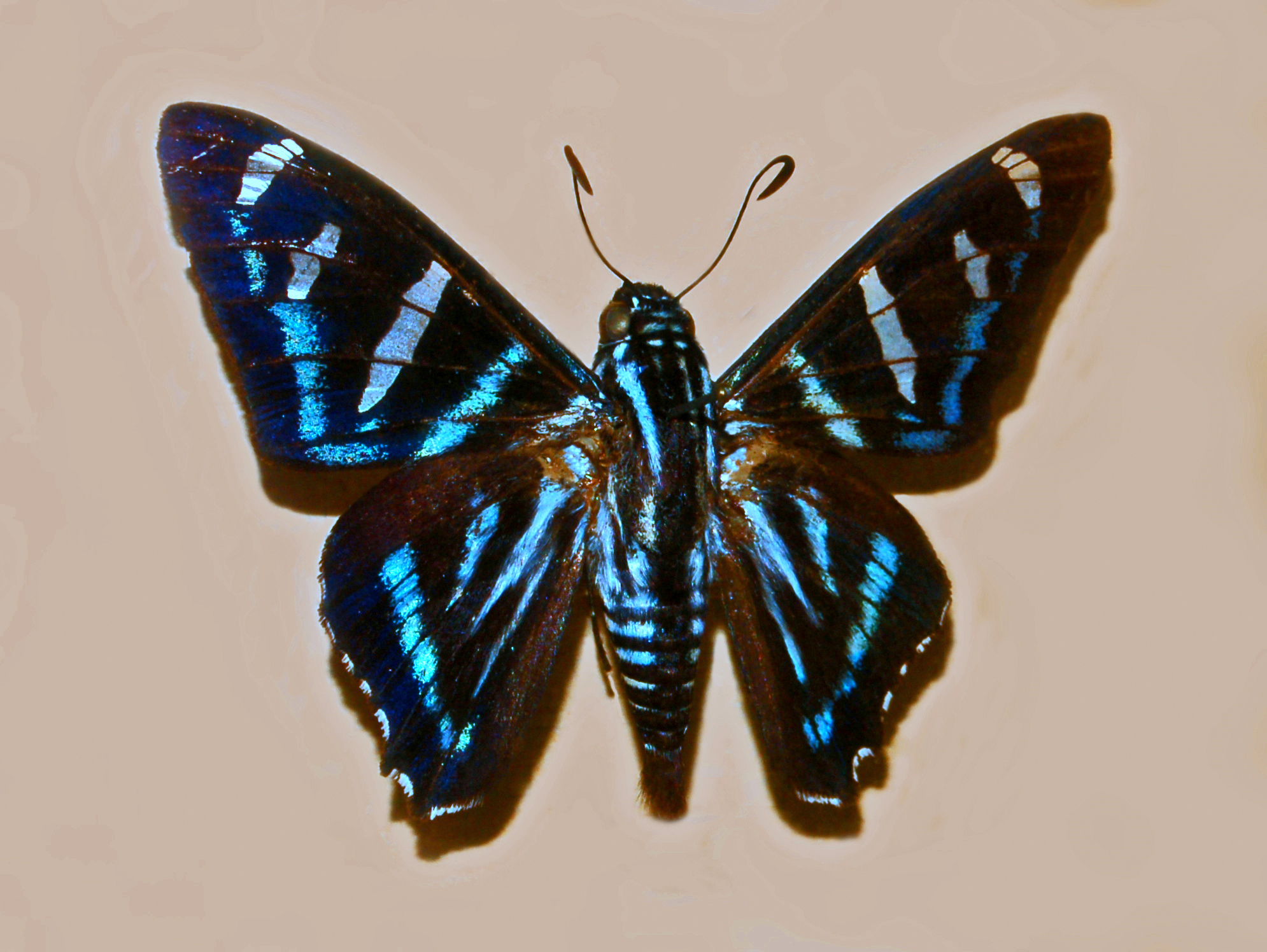
- From Peru - mounted specimen

Scientific classification
- Kingdom: Animalia
- Phylum: Arthropoda
- Class: Insecta
- Order: Lepidoptera
- Family: Hesperiidae
- Genus: Jemadia
- Species: J. menechmus

Binomial name
- Jemadia menechmus (Mabille, 1878)

Synonyms
- Pyrrhopyge menechmus Mabille, 1878

= Jemadia menechmus =

Species of butterfly

Jemadia menechmus, or Mabille's sabre-wing, is a species of skipper butterflies in the family Hesperiidae.

== Description ==
These butterflies have a broad thorax and a conical abdomen. The uppersides of the wings are black with several longitudinal metallic blue streaks and bands and a few hyaline (glass-like) windows on the forewings.

== Distribution ==
This species occurs in the Amazonian areas of Brazil and Peru.
