= Meza banda =

Scientific classification
- Kingdom: Animalia
- Phylum: Arthropoda
- Clade: Pancrustacea
- Class: Insecta
- Order: Lepidoptera
- Family: Hesperiidae
- Genus: Meza
- Species: M. banda

Binomial name
- Meza banda (Evans, 1937)

Synonyms
- Gastrochaeta banda Evans, 1937

Species of butterfly

Meza banda, the dark three-spot missile, is a butterfly in the family Hesperiidae. It is found in Nigeria (the Cross River loop), Cameroon, the Central African Republic and the central part of the Democratic Republic of the Congo. The habitat consists of forests and mature secondary growth.

Adults are attracted to flowers.
