= Fresna maesseni =

Scientific classification
- Kingdom: Animalia
- Phylum: Arthropoda
- Class: Insecta
- Order: Lepidoptera
- Family: Hesperiidae
- Genus: Fresna
- Species: F. maesseni

Binomial name
- Fresna maesseni Miller, 1971

Species of butterfly

Fresna maesseni, commonly known as Maessen's Acraea skipper, is a species of butterfly in the family Hesperiidae. It is found in Ivory Coast, Ghana and Cameroon. The habitat consists of forests.
