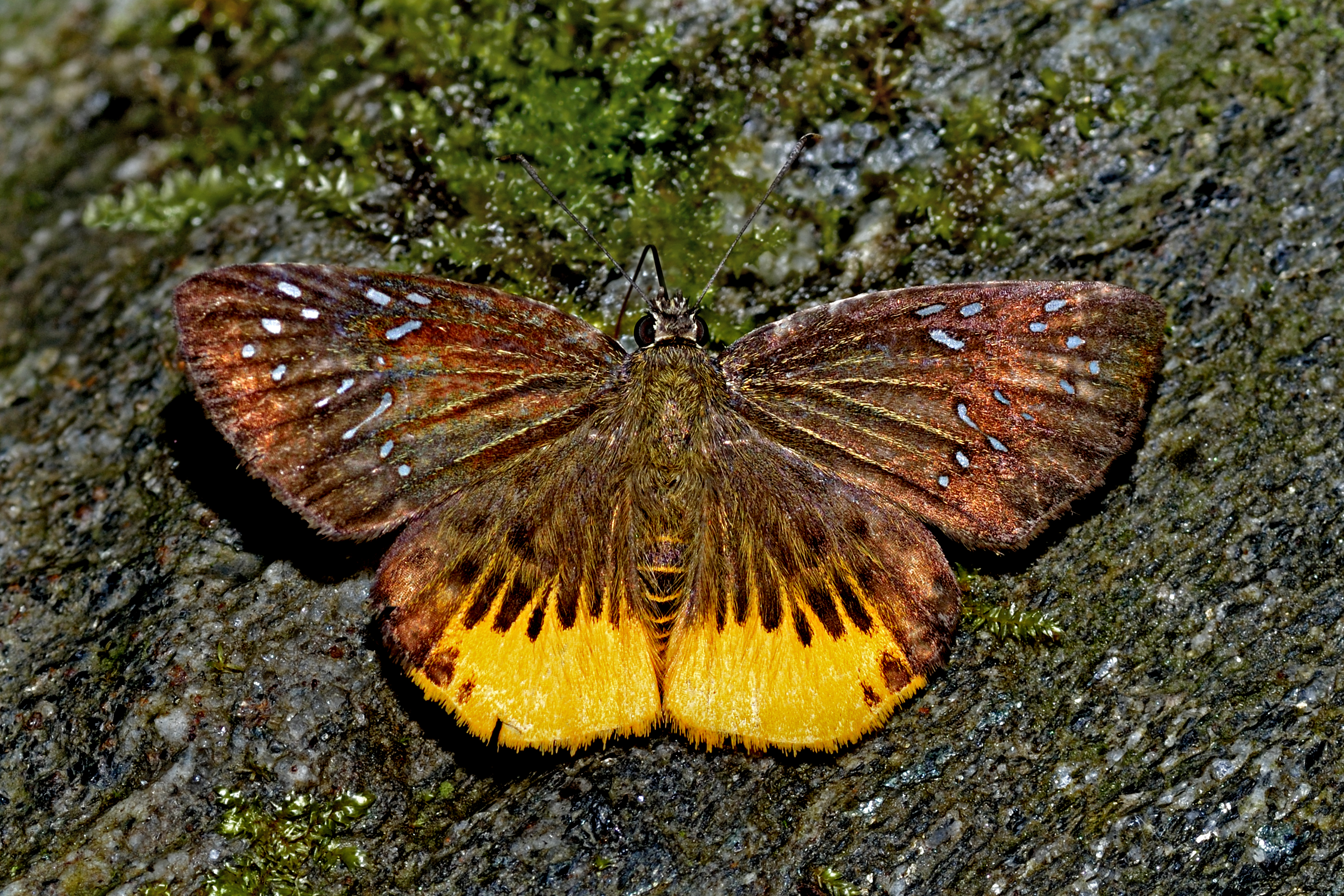
- Figure 20 from William Lucas Distant's Rhopalocera Malayana

Scientific classification
- Kingdom: Animalia
- Phylum: Arthropoda
- Clade: Pancrustacea
- Class: Insecta
- Order: Lepidoptera
- Family: Hesperiidae
- Genus: Mooreana
- Species: M. trichoneura

Binomial name
- Mooreana trichoneura (C. & R. Felder, 1860)

Synonyms
- Pterygospidea trichoneura C. & R. Felder, 1860; Tagiades trichoneura; Pterygospidea trichoneura pralaya Moore, [1866]; Tagiades pralaya pellita Fruhstorfer, 1909; Tagiades multipunctata Crowley, 1900; Tagiades trichoneura nivosa Fruhstorfer, 1909; Tagiades trichoneura nava Fruhstorfer, 1909

= Mooreana trichoneura =

Yellow flat

Species of butterfly

Mooreana trichoneura, the yellow flat, is a butterfly belonging to the family Hesperiidae and subfamily Pyrginae (flats). It has a wingspan of 32–36 mm.

== Description ==
Its upperside is dark brown, and the forewing has a number of white hyaline (glass-like) spots and strokes in the outer half of the wing, while the hindwing has a series of black wedge-shaped discal spots and a yellow tornal area. The underside of the hindwing is predominantly yellowish white.

== Distribution ==
The yellow flat has a wide distribution. It ranges from India to Thailand to Malaysia and can even be found in the Philippines. In 2012, it was discovered in Singapore.

== Habitat ==
The yellow flat is usually found in lowland forests up to 833 m (2500 ft).

== Habits ==
Like other butterflies in its subfamily, it flies quickly and usually rests on the underside of a leaf with its wings open flat.

== Host plant ==
- Mallotus paniculatus

== Subspecies ==
- Mooreana trichoneura trichoneura
- Mooreana trichoneura pralaya (Moore, [1866])
- Mooreana trichoneura multipunctata (Crowley, 1900) (Hainan)
- Mooreana trichoneura nivosa (Fruhstorfer, 1909) (Nias)
- Mooreana trichoneura nava (Fruhstorfer, 1909) (Java)

The subspecies of Mooreana trichoneura found in India are-

- Mooreana trichoneura pralaya Moore, 1865 – Yellow-veined Flat
