= Fresna jacquelinae =

Scientific classification
- Kingdom: Animalia
- Phylum: Arthropoda
- Class: Insecta
- Order: Lepidoptera
- Family: Hesperiidae
- Genus: Fresna
- Species: F. jacquelinae

Binomial name
- Fresna jacquelinae Collins & Larsen, 2003

Species of butterfly

Fresna jacquelinae is a species of butterfly in the family Hesperiidae. It is found in Cameroon.

== Etymology ==
The species is named for Jacqueline Miller of the Allyn Museum in Sarasota, Florida, United States, in recognition of her contributions to Afrotropical lepidopterology.
