= Mnasicles =

Scientific classification
- Kingdom: Animalia
- Phylum: Arthropoda
- Class: Insecta
- Order: Lepidoptera
- Family: Hesperiidae
- Subtribe: Moncina
- Genus: Mnasicles; Godman, [1901]

Genus of butterflies

Mnasicles is a genus of skippers in the family Hesperiidae.

== Species ==
- Mnasicles geta Godman, 1901
- Mnasicles hicetaon Godman, 1901

== Former species ==
- Mnasicles thymoetes Hayward, 1941, transferred to Mnasalcas.
