= Meza elba =

Scientific classification
- Domain: Eukaryota
- Kingdom: Animalia
- Phylum: Arthropoda
- Class: Insecta
- Order: Lepidoptera
- Family: Hesperiidae
- Genus: Meza
- Species: M. elba

Binomial name
- Meza elba (Evans, 1937)

Synonyms
- Gastrochaeta elba Evans, 1937

Species of butterfly

Meza elba, the light brown missile, is a butterfly in the family Hesperiidae. It is found in Guinea, Sierra Leone, Ivory Coast, Ghana, Nigeria, Cameroon and the Republic of the Congo.
