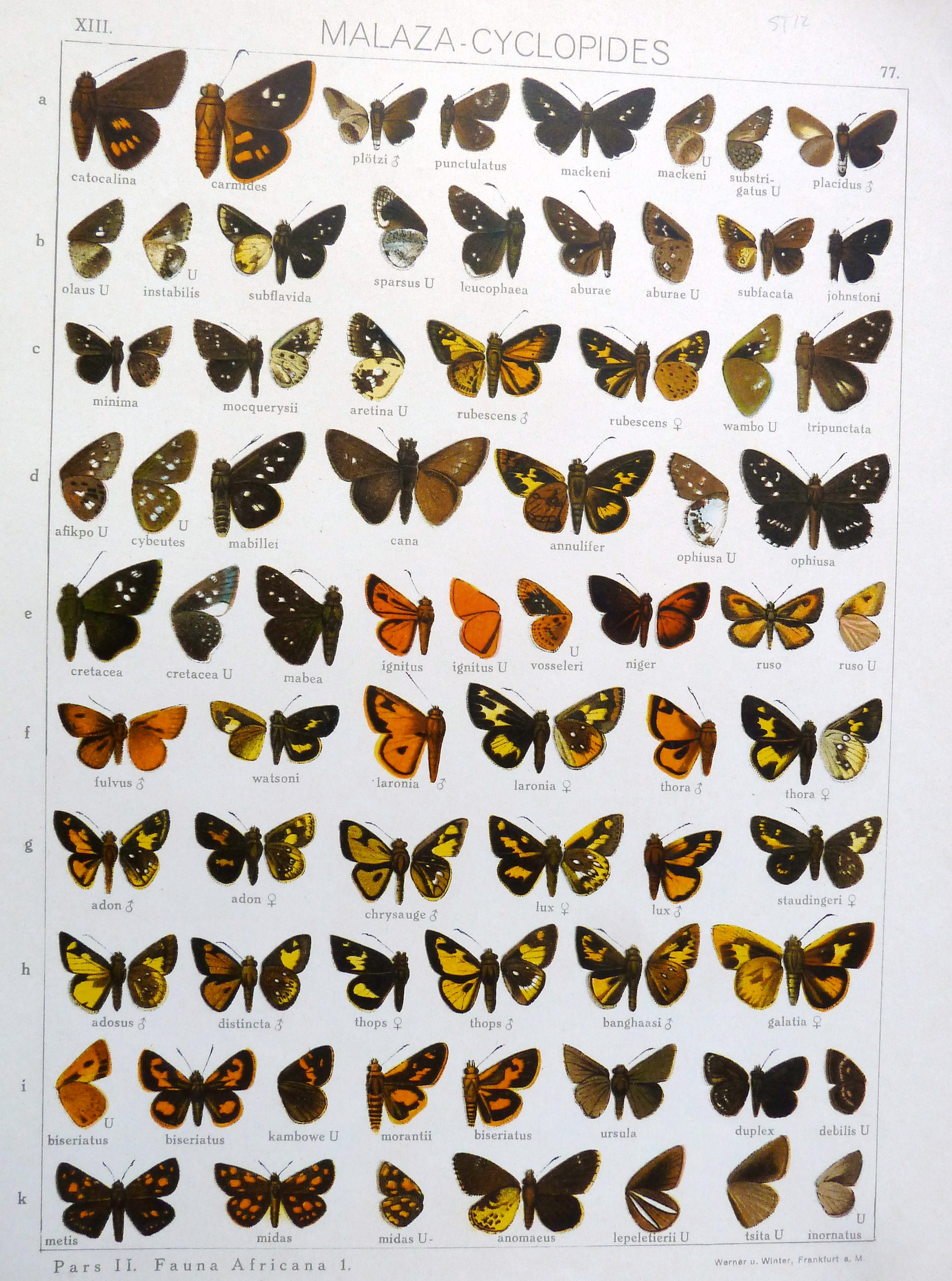

Scientific classification
- Kingdom: Animalia
- Phylum: Arthropoda
- Clade: Pancrustacea
- Class: Insecta
- Order: Lepidoptera
- Family: Hesperiidae
- Genus: Meza
- Species: M. cybeutes

Binomial name
- Meza cybeutes (Holland, 1894)

Synonyms
- Gastrochaeta cybeutes Holland, 1894; Gorgyra tessmanni Strand, 1913 (also listed as a synonym of Gorgyra rubescens); Gastrochaeta cybeutes pallida Evans, 1937; Gastrochaeta cybeutes var. pallida Holland, 1896

= Meza cybeutes =

Species of butterfly

Meza cybeutes, the drab three-spot missile, is a butterfly in the family Hesperiidae. It is found in Guinea, Sierra Leone, Ivory Coast, Ghana, Nigeria, Cameroon, Gabon, the Republic of the Congo, the Central African Republic, Angola, the Democratic Republic of the Congo, Uganda and Tanzania. The habitat consists of forests.

The larvae feed on Dichapetalum guineense.

== Subspecies ==
- Meza cybeutes cybeutes (Nigeria, Cameroon, Gabon, Congo, Central African Republic, Angola, central Democratic Republic of the Congo)
- Meza cybeutes pallida (Evans, 1937) (eastern Democratic Republic of the Congo, western Uganda, north-western Tanzania)
- Meza cybeutes volta Miller, 1971 (Guinea, Sierra Leone, Ivory Coast, Ghana, Nigeria)
