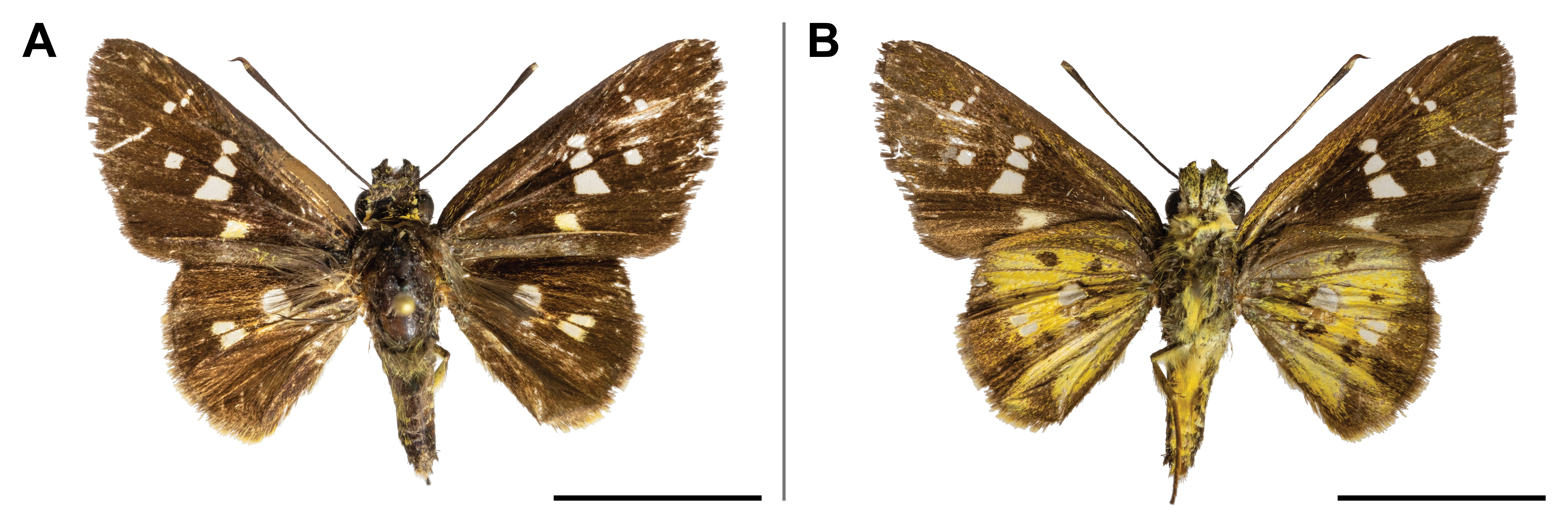

Scientific classification
- Domain: Eukaryota
- Kingdom: Animalia
- Phylum: Arthropoda
- Class: Insecta
- Order: Lepidoptera
- Family: Hesperiidae
- Genus: Meza
- Species: M. mabillei

Binomial name
- Meza mabillei (Holland, 1893)

Synonyms
- Gastrochaeta mabillei Holland, 1893

= Meza mabillei =

Species of butterfly

Meza mabillei, Mabille's three-spot missile, is a butterfly in the family Hesperiidae. It is found in Guinea, Sierra Leone, Liberia, Ivory Coast, Ghana, Nigeria and Gabon. The habitat consists of forests.

Adults are attracted to flowers.
