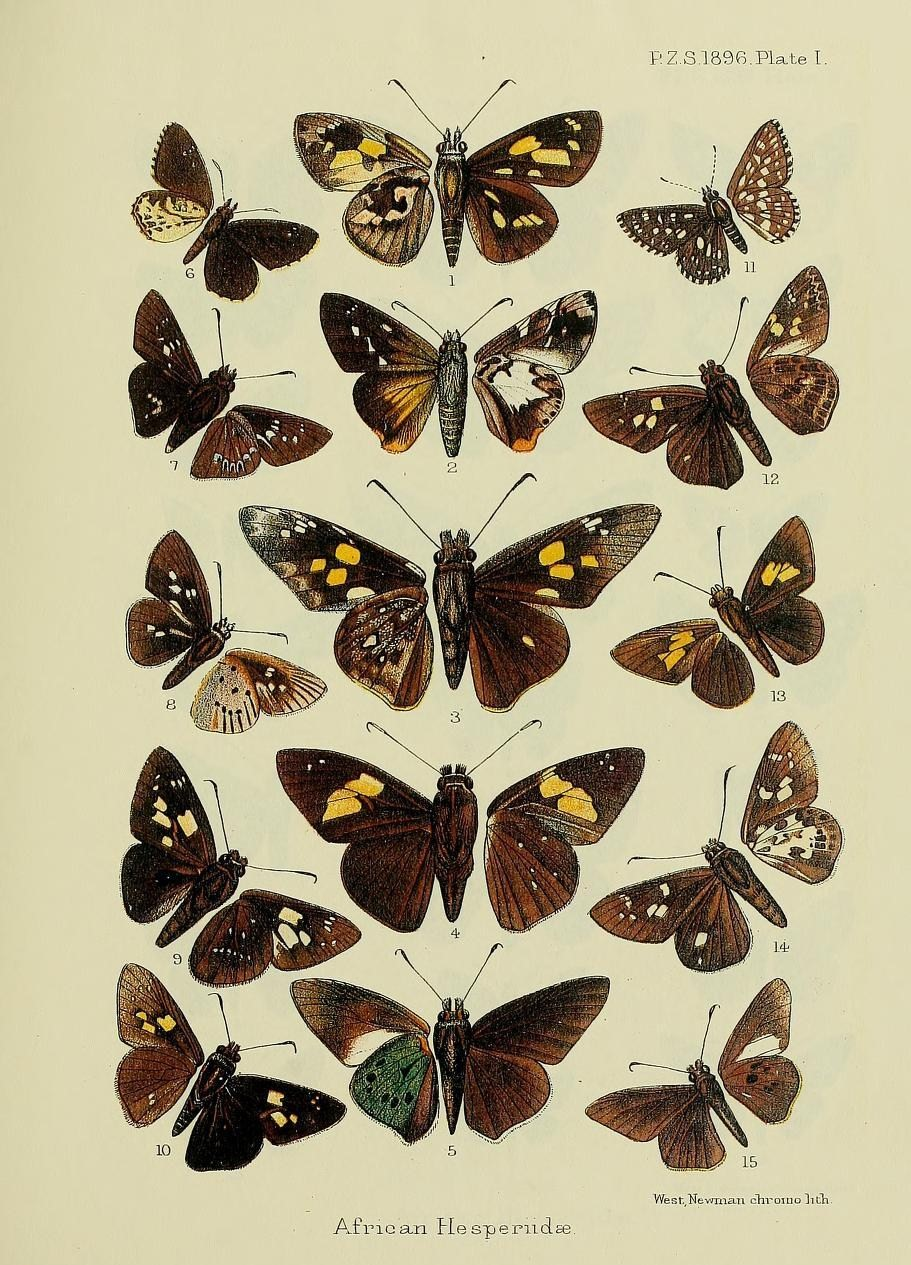
- Fresna nyassae figure 8

Scientific classification
- Kingdom: Animalia
- Phylum: Arthropoda
- Class: Insecta
- Order: Lepidoptera
- Family: Hesperiidae
- Genus: Fresna
- Species: F. nyassae

Binomial name
- Fresna nyassae (Hewitson, 1878)

Synonyms
- List: Hesperia nyassae Hewitson, 1878; Parnara nyassae f. ennuari Riley, 1921; Hesperia roncilgonis Plötz, 1882; Fresna nyassae f. plata Evans, 1937; Fresna nyassae f. joppa Evans, 1937

= Fresna nyassae =

Species of butterfly

Fresna nyassae, also known as the variegated Acraea skipper or variegated Acraea hopper, is a species of butterfly in the family Hesperiidae. It is found from Ghana and Kenya to South Africa.

The wingspan is 34–38 mm for males and 39–42 mm for females.
