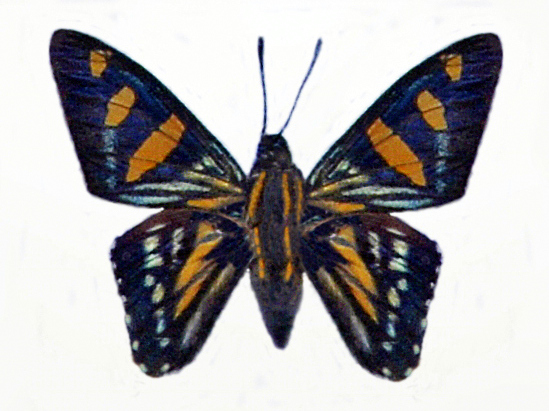

Scientific classification
- Kingdom: Animalia
- Phylum: Arthropoda
- Class: Insecta
- Order: Lepidoptera
- Family: Hesperiidae
- Genus: Mimardaris
- Species: M. sela

Binomial name
- Mimardaris sela (Hewitson, 1866)

= Mimardaris sela =

Species of butterfly

Mimardaris sela, the sela skipper, is a Neotropical species of firetip butterfly in the family Hesperiidae. The species was first described by William Chapman Hewitson in 1866.

== Subspecies ==
Subspecies include:

- Mimardaris sela sela (Hewitson, 1866) Colombia
- Mimardaris sela aequatorea (Röber, 1925) Ecuador, Colombia, northern Peru
- Mimardaris sela chanchamayonis (Draudt, 1924) Peru, Bolivia
- Mimardaris sela periphema (Hewitson, 1875) Peru, Bolivia
- Mimardaris sela peruviana (Draudt, 1921) Peru

== Distribution and habitat ==
This species is present in Colombia, Ecuador, Bolivia and Peru. These butterflies mainly inhabit transitional rainforest and cloudforest areas on the eastern slopes of the Andes, at an elevation of 100–1,600 metres (330–5,250 ft) above sea level.

== Description ==
Mimardaris sela is characterised by a large thorax and a conical abdomen. The wings are black, with coppery "windows" on the forewings and various blue stripes on the forewings and hindwings. On the thorax are also present dark longitudinal orange stripes.
