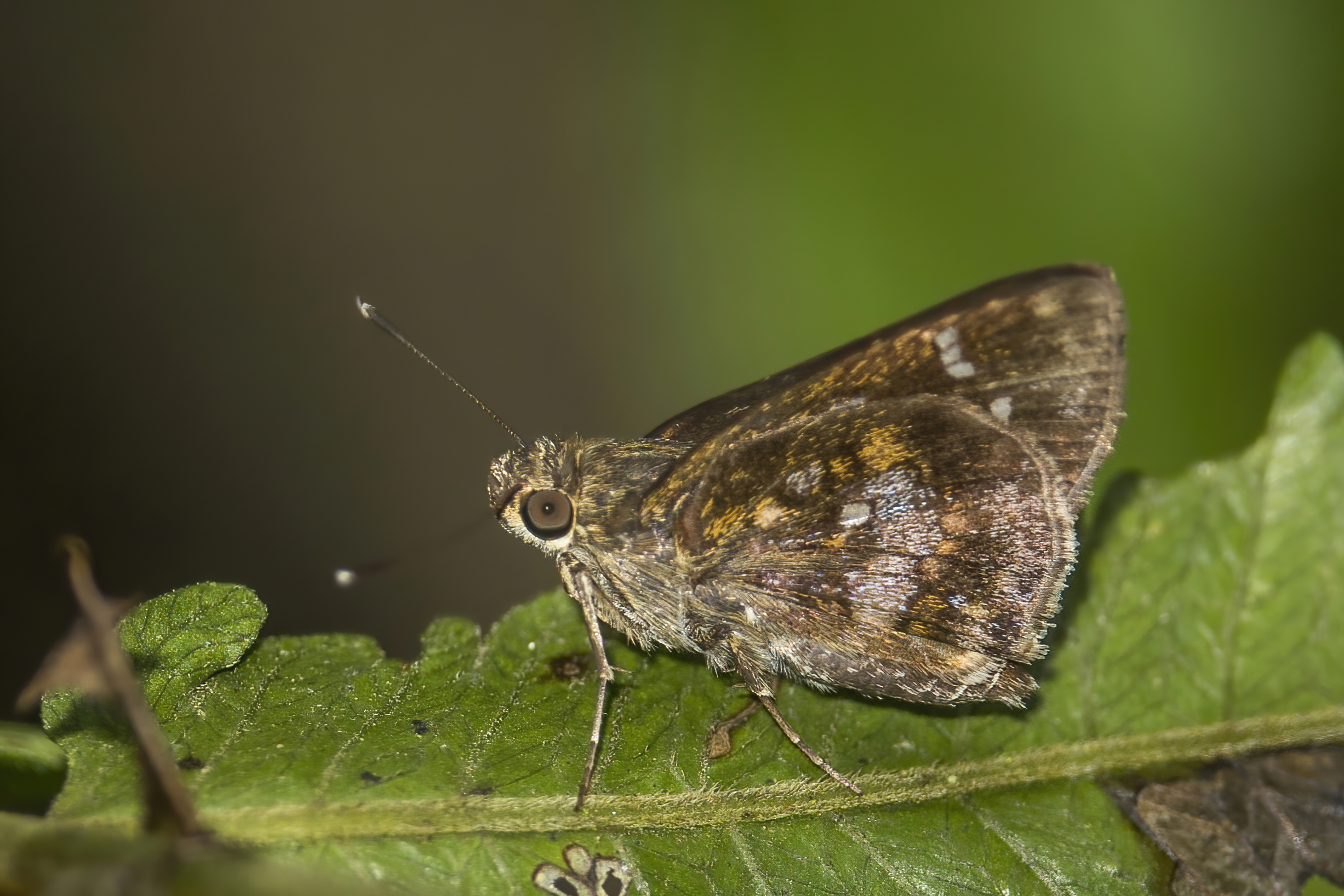
- in Ghana

Scientific classification
- Kingdom: Animalia
- Phylum: Arthropoda
- Clade: Pancrustacea
- Class: Insecta
- Order: Lepidoptera
- Family: Hesperiidae
- Genus: Meza
- Species: M. meza

Binomial name
- Meza meza (Hewitson, 1877)

Synonyms
- Hesperia meza Hewitson, 1877; Apaustus batea Plötz, 1879; Pamphila bubovi Karsch, 1893; Gastrochaeta varia Mabille; Holland, 1896; Baoris ogrugana Lathy, 1903

= Meza meza =

Species of butterfly

Meza meza, the common missile, is a butterfly in the family Hesperiidae. It is found in Senegal, Guinea-Bissau, Guinea, Sierra Leone, Liberia, Burkina Faso, Ivory Coast, Ghana, Togo, Nigeria, Cameroon, Angola, the Democratic Republic of the Congo and Uganda. The habitat consists of disturbed and successional forests.

Adults are attracted to flowers.

The larvae feed on Paspalum conjugatum.

Torben Larsen developed a species numbering system for his 2005 publication Butterflies of West Africa. This species is #1354. The 'Larsen' numbers have since been used with permission in A Sharp Eye on Butterflies of Ghana.
