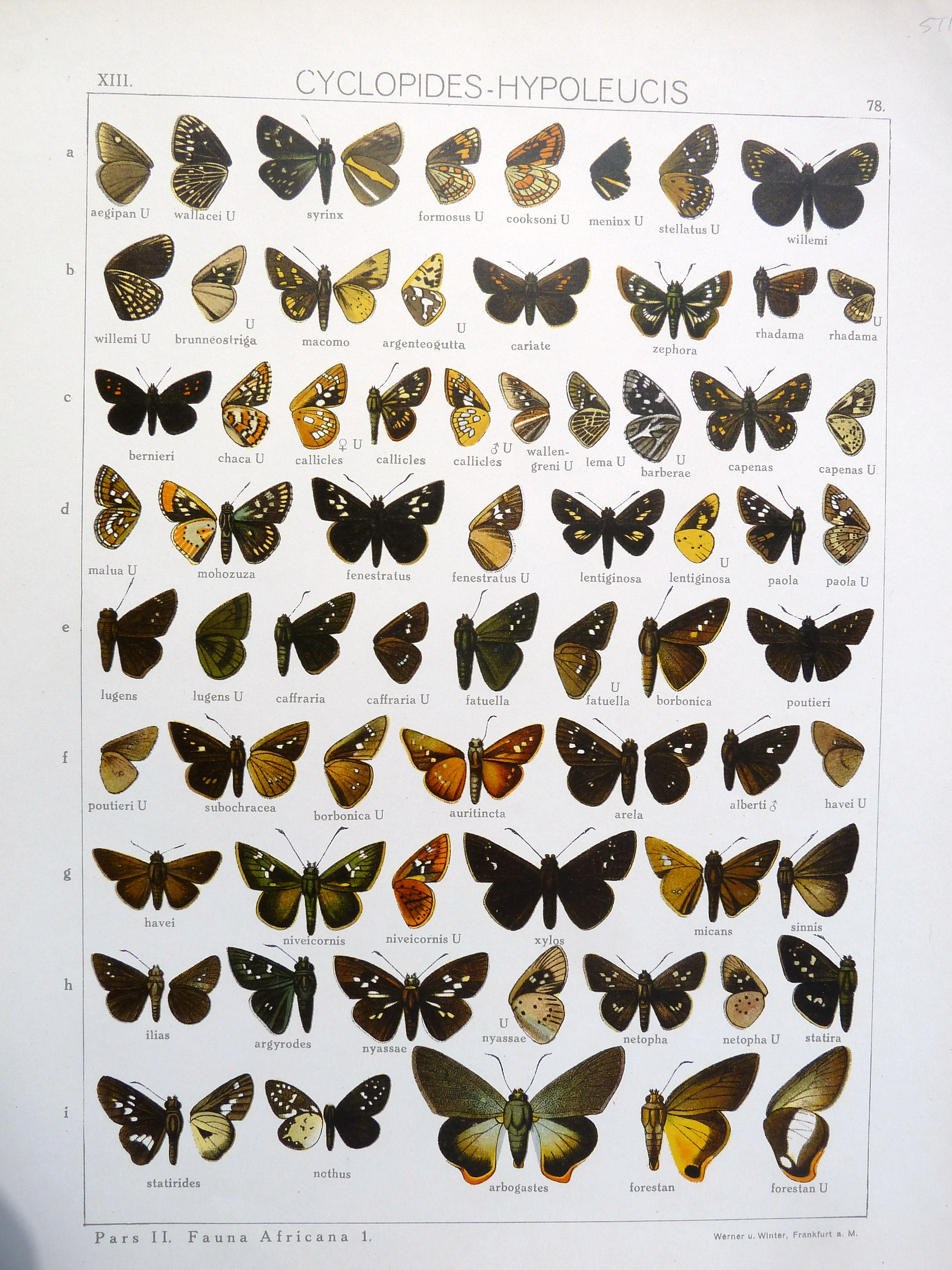

Scientific classification
- Kingdom: Animalia
- Phylum: Arthropoda
- Clade: Pancrustacea
- Class: Insecta
- Order: Lepidoptera
- Family: Hesperiidae
- Genus: Fresna
- Species: F. netopha

Binomial name
- Fresna netopha (Hewitson, 1878)

Synonyms
- Hesperia netopha Hewitson, 1878

= Fresna netopha =

Species of butterfly

Fresna netopha, the common Acraea skipper, is a species of butterfly in the family Hesperiidae. It is found in Guinea, Sierra Leone, Liberia, Ivory Coast, Ghana, Togo, Nigeria, Cameroon, Gabon, the Republic of the Congo, the Central African Republic, the Democratic Republic of the Congo, Uganda, Rwanda, Burundi, western Kenya, Tanzania and north-eastern Zambia. The habitat consists of drier, open forests and the transitional zone between forests and Guinea savanna.

Adults are attracted to flowers.

The larvae feed on Afrormosia laxiflora.

Torben Larsen developed a species numbering system for his 2005 publication Butterflies of West Africa. This species is #1427. The 'Larsen' numbers have since been used with permission in A Sharp Eye on Butterflies of Ghana.
