= Fresna cojo =

Scientific classification
- Kingdom: Animalia
- Phylum: Arthropoda
- Class: Insecta
- Order: Lepidoptera
- Family: Hesperiidae
- Genus: Fresna
- Species: F. cojo

Binomial name
- Fresna cojo (Karsch, 1893)

Synonyms
- Pamphila (Hesperia) cojo Karsch, 1893

Species of butterfly

Fresna cojo, the large Acraea skipper, is a species of butterfly in the family Hesperiidae. It is found in Senegal, Guinea-Bissau, Guinea, Sierra Leone, Ivory Coast, Ghana, Togo, Nigeria, Cameroon, the Republic of the Congo, the Central African Republic, the Democratic Republic of the Congo, Uganda, western Kenya, north-western Tanzania and Zambia. The habitat consists of drier open forests and transitional areas into Guinea savanna.

Adults have been recorded on the flowers of Tagetes species.

The larvae feed on Anthonotha crassifolia, Albizia zygia, Andira inermis and Millettia thoningi.
