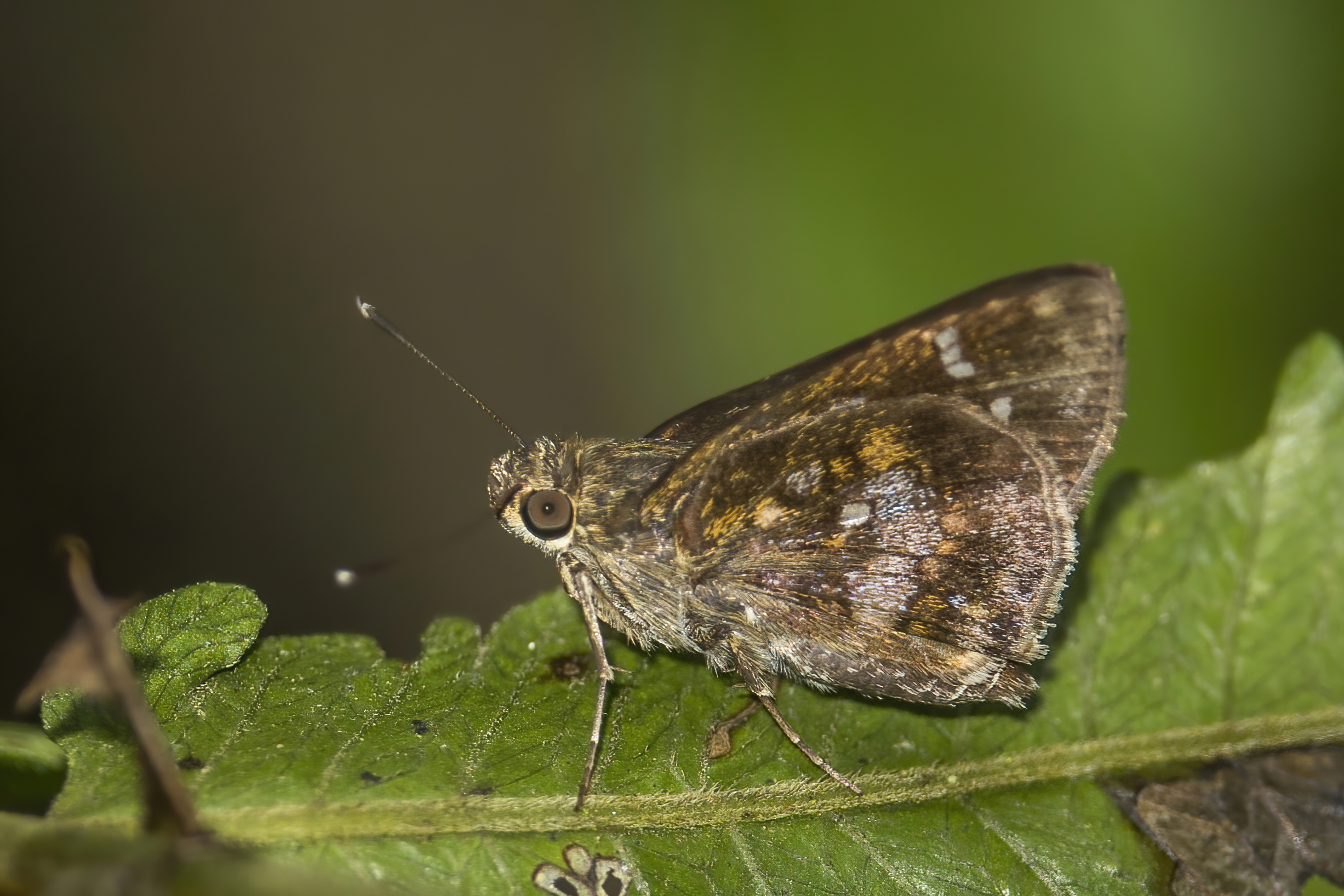
- M. meza in Ghana

Scientific classification
- Kingdom: Animalia
- Phylum: Arthropoda
- Class: Insecta
- Order: Lepidoptera
- Family: Hesperiidae
- Tribe: Ceratrichiini
- Genus: Meza; Hemming, 1939

Synonyms
- Gastrochaeta Holland, 1894

= Meza (butterfly) =

Genus of butterflies

Meza is a genus of skippers in the family Hesperiidae.

== Species ==
- Meza banda (Evans, 1937)
- Meza cybeutes (Holland, 1894)
- Meza elba (Evans, 1937)
- Meza gardineri Collins & Larsen, 2008
- Meza indusiata (Mabille, 1891)
- Meza mabillei (Holland, 1894)
- Meza meza (Hewitson, 1877)

For the following, see Fresna after Grishin, 2023

- Meza larea (Neave, 1910)
- Meza leucophaea (Holland, 1894)
- Meza mabea (Holland, 1894)
