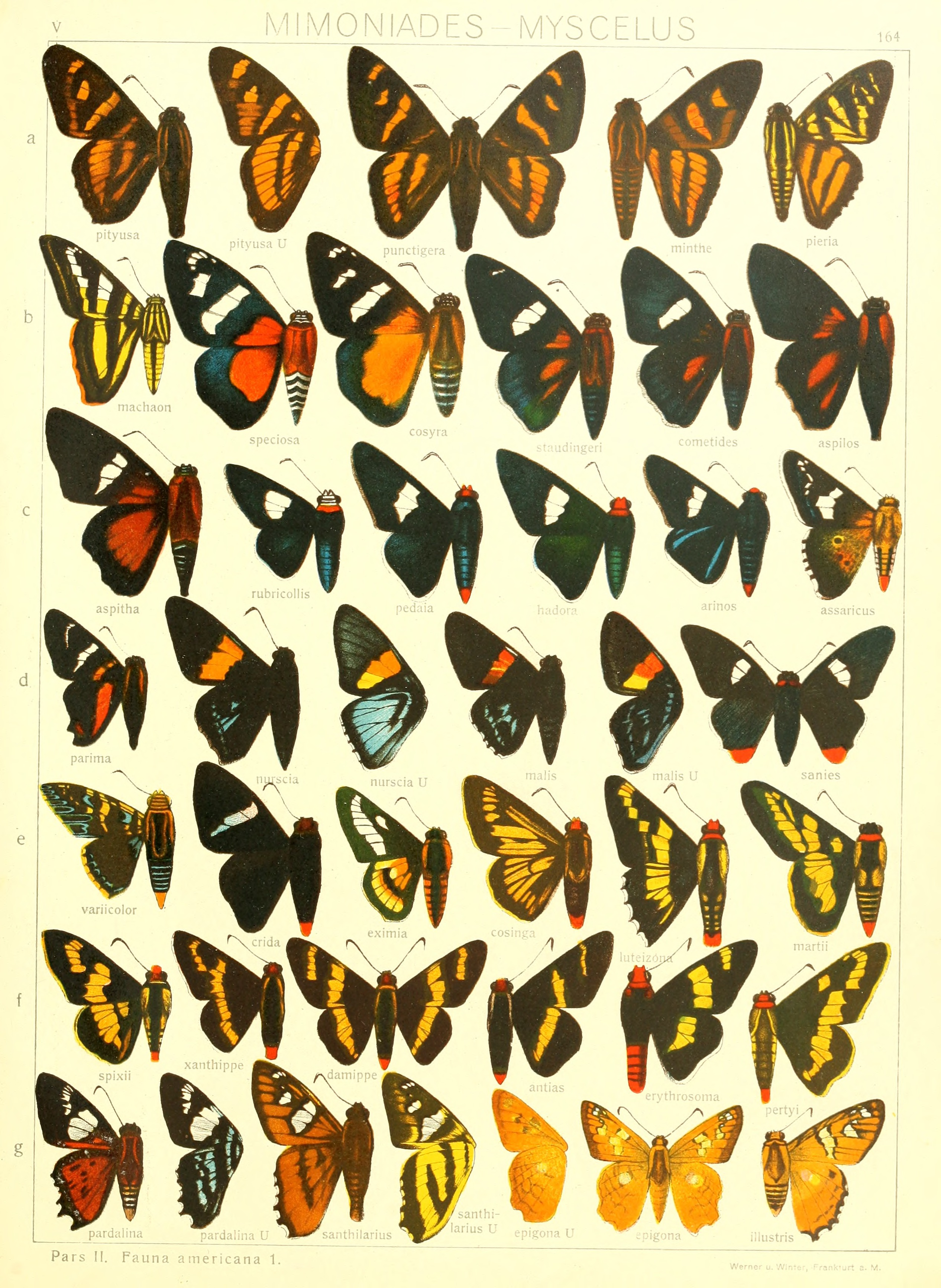
- Microceris and related genera in Adalbert Seitz's Macrolepidoptera of the World

Scientific classification
- Kingdom: Animalia
- Phylum: Arthropoda
- Class: Insecta
- Order: Lepidoptera
- Family: Hesperiidae
- Genus: Microceris
- Species: M. variicolor

Binomial name
- Microceris variicolor (Ménétriés 1855)

= Microceris =

Genus of butterflies

Microceris is a Neotropical genus of firetips in the family Hesperiidae endemic to Brazil. The genus is monotypic containing the single species Microceris variicolor.
