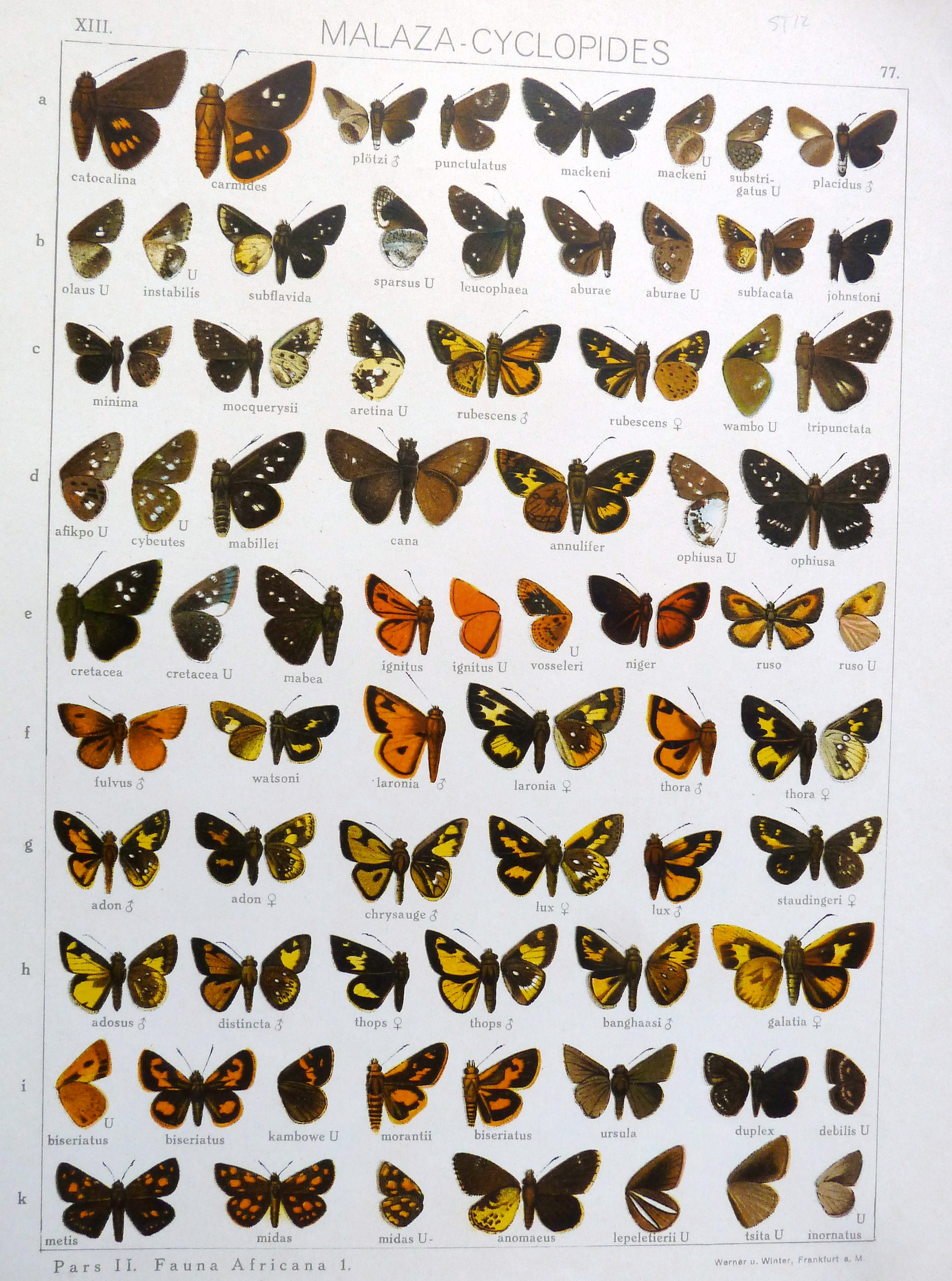

Scientific classification
- Kingdom: Animalia
- Phylum: Arthropoda
- Clade: Pancrustacea
- Class: Insecta
- Order: Lepidoptera
- Family: Hesperiidae
- Genus: Meza
- Species: M. mabea

Binomial name
- Meza mabea (Holland, 1894)

Synonyms
- Parnara mabea Holland, 1894

= Meza mabea =

Species of butterfly

Meza mabea, the dark brown missile, is a butterfly in the family Hesperiidae. It is found in Guinea, Sierra Leone, Ivory Coast, Ghana, Cameroon, Gabon, the Republic of the Congo, the Central African Republic and western Tanzania. The habitat consists of drier forests.

The larvae feed on Dalbergia heudelotti, Dalbergia oblongifolia and Baphia pubescens.
