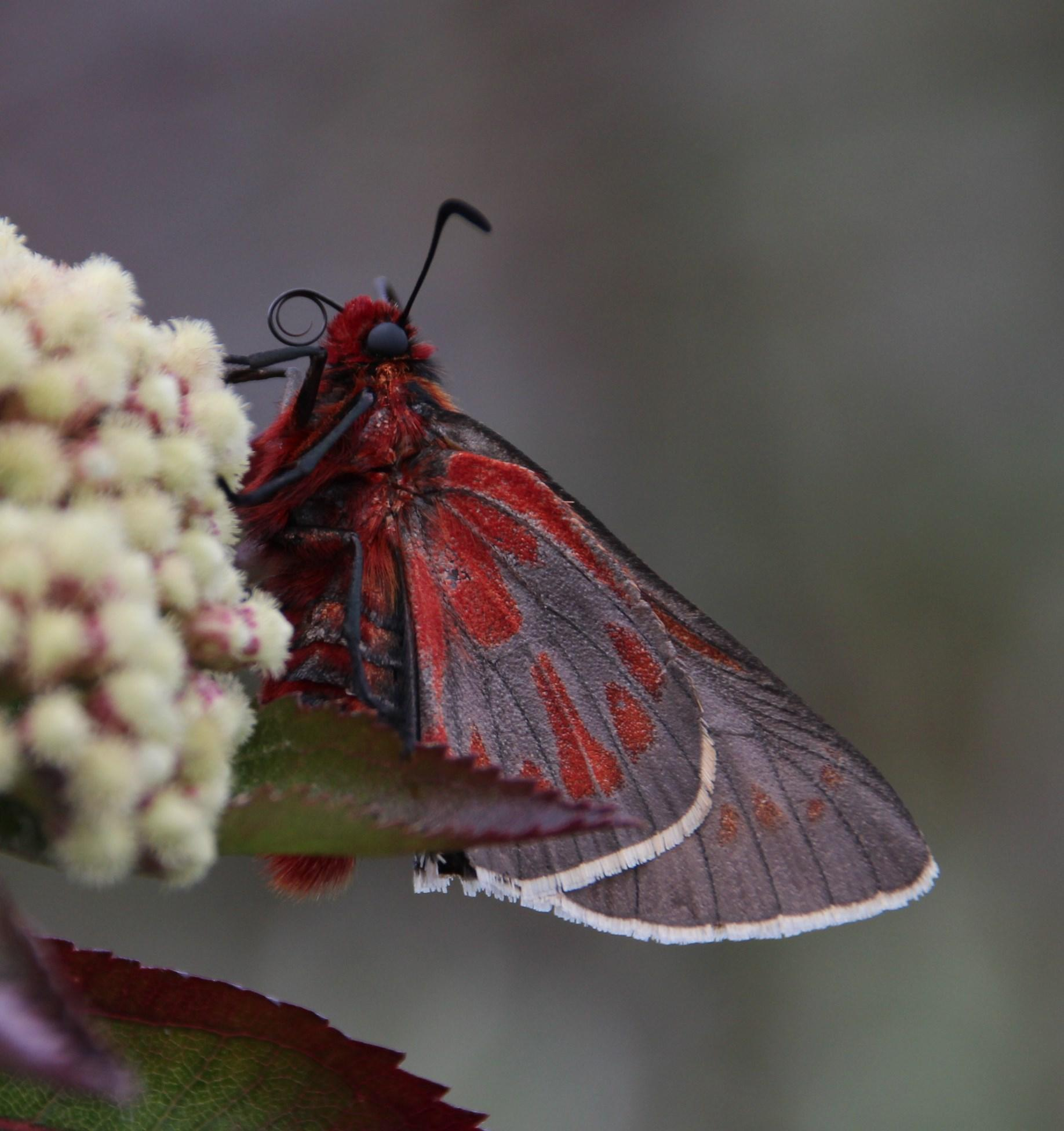

Scientific classification
- Kingdom: Animalia
- Phylum: Arthropoda
- Class: Insecta
- Order: Lepidoptera
- Family: Hesperiidae
- Genus: Metardaris; Mabille, 1903
- Species: M. cosinga

Binomial name
- Metardaris cosinga (Hewitson, 1874)

= Metardaris =

Genus of butterflies

Metardaris is a Neotropical genus of firetips in the family Hesperiidae. The genus is monotypic containing the single species Metardaris cosinga, present in Bolivia and Peru. M. cosinga's larvae are considered a delicacy, and are known as Huaytampo to the people of Peru.
