= Metiscus =

Scientific classification
- Kingdom: Animalia
- Phylum: Arthropoda
- Class: Insecta
- Order: Lepidoptera
- Family: Hesperiidae
- Subfamily: Hesperiinae
- Genus: Metiscus; Godman, [1900]

Genus of butterflies

Metiscus is a genus of skippers in the family Hesperiidae. Species of the genus are found in Central America.

== Species ==
Recognised species in the genus Metiscus include:

- Metiscus angularis (Möschler, 1877)
- Metiscus atheas Godman, 1900 - Mather's brown-eye
- Metiscus goth Grishin, 2022
