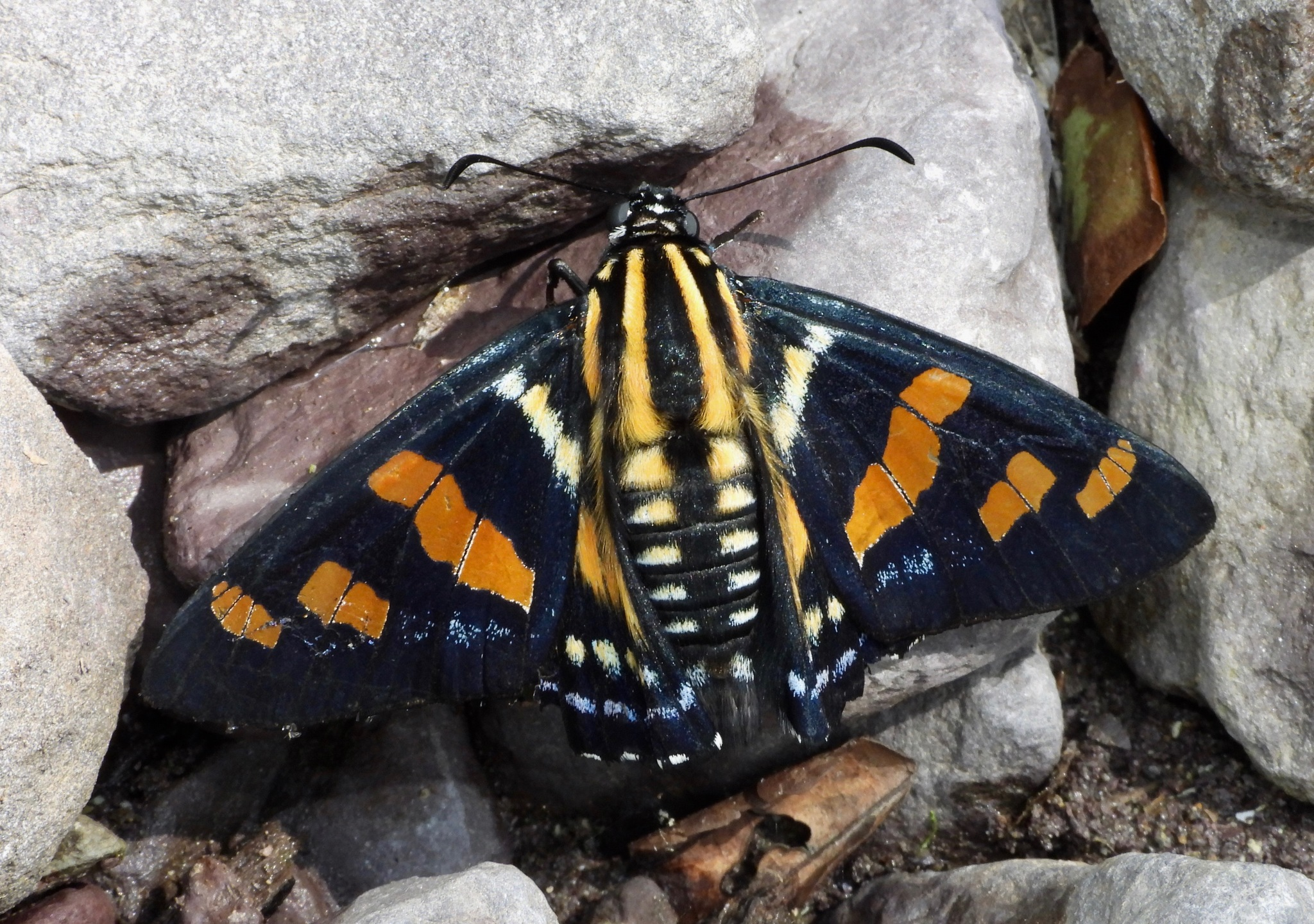
- Mimardaris sela

Scientific classification
- Kingdom: Animalia
- Phylum: Arthropoda
- Class: Insecta
- Order: Lepidoptera
- Family: Hesperiidae
- Genus: Mimardaris; Mielke, 2002

= Mimardaris =

Genus of butterflies

Mimardaris is a Neotropical genus of firetip butterflies in the family Hesperiidae. The genus was erected by Olaf Hermann Hendrik Mielke in 2002.

== Species ==
- Mimardaris aerata (Godman & Salvin, 1879) Colombia
- Mimardaris lomax (Evans, 1951) Peru
- Mimardaris minthe (Godman & Salvin, 1879) Ecuador
- Mimardaris montra (Evans, 1951) Peru
- Mimardaris pityusa (Hewitson, 1857 Colombia, Ecuador
- Mimardaris porus (Plötz, 1879) Colombia, Peru
- Mimardaris sela (Hewitson, 1866) Colombia, Ecuador, Bolivia, Peru
