= Methionopsis =

Scientific classification
- Kingdom: Animalia
- Phylum: Arthropoda
- Class: Insecta
- Order: Lepidoptera
- Family: Hesperiidae
- Subtribe: Falgina
- Genus: Methionopsis; Godman, 1901

Synonyms
- Miltomiges Mabille, 1903

Genus of butterflies

Methionopsis is a genus of skippers in the family Hesperiidae.

== Species ==
Recognised species include:

- Methionopsis cinnamomea (Herrich-Schäffer, 1869)
- Methionopsis ina Plötz, 1882
- Methionopsis modestus Godman, 1901
- Methionopsis patage Godman, 1900
- Methionopsis purus Bell, 1940
