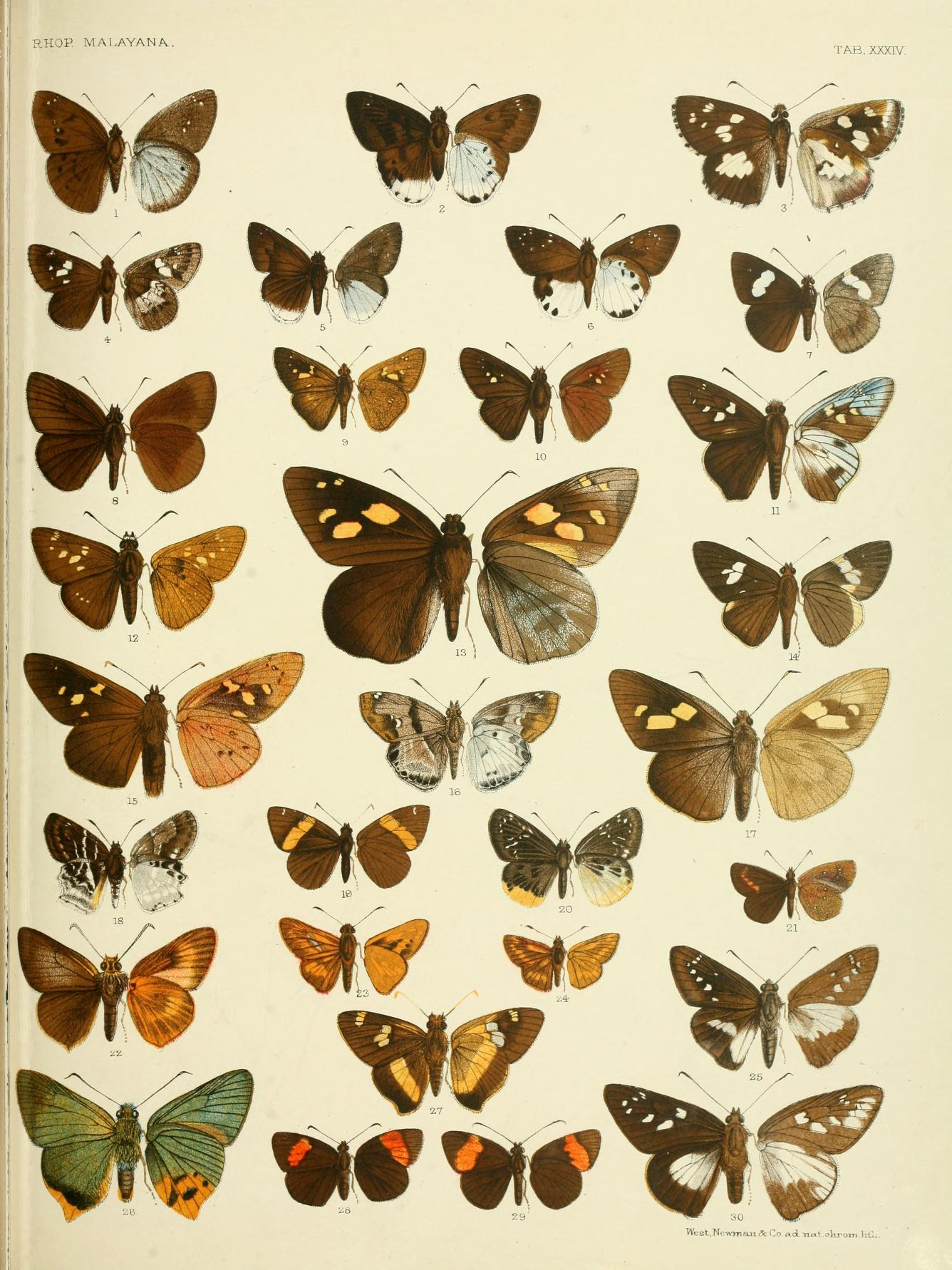
- Mooreana trichoneura in Rhopalocera Malayana (figure 20)

Scientific classification
- Kingdom: Animalia
- Phylum: Arthropoda
- Class: Insecta
- Order: Lepidoptera
- Family: Hesperiidae
- Subfamily: Pyrginae
- Genus: Mooreana; Evans, 1926

= Mooreana =

Genus of butterflies

Mooreana is an Indomalayan genus of spread-winged skippers in the family Hesperiidae.

== Species ==
- Mooreana boisduvali (Mabille, 1876) Celebes
- Mooreana princeps (Semper, 1892) Philippines
- Mooreana trichoneura (C. & R. Felder, 1860)
