= Morys =

Morys may refer to:

== Given name ==
- Morys Bruce, 4th Baron Aberdare (1919–2005), British politician
- Morys Clynnog (1525–1581), Catholic priest and recusant exile
- Morys Wynn ap John (1520–1580), Welsh courtier and politician

== Surname ==
- Daniel Morys (2000), Polish footballer
- Huw Morus (1622–1709), Welsh poet
- Matthias Morys (1987), Polish-German former football forward
- Nicholas Morys (fl. 1414), English politician
- Twm Morys (1961), Welsh poet and musician

== See also ==
- Maurice
- Moris
- Morris
- Mory's
- Pittsburgh Morrys
