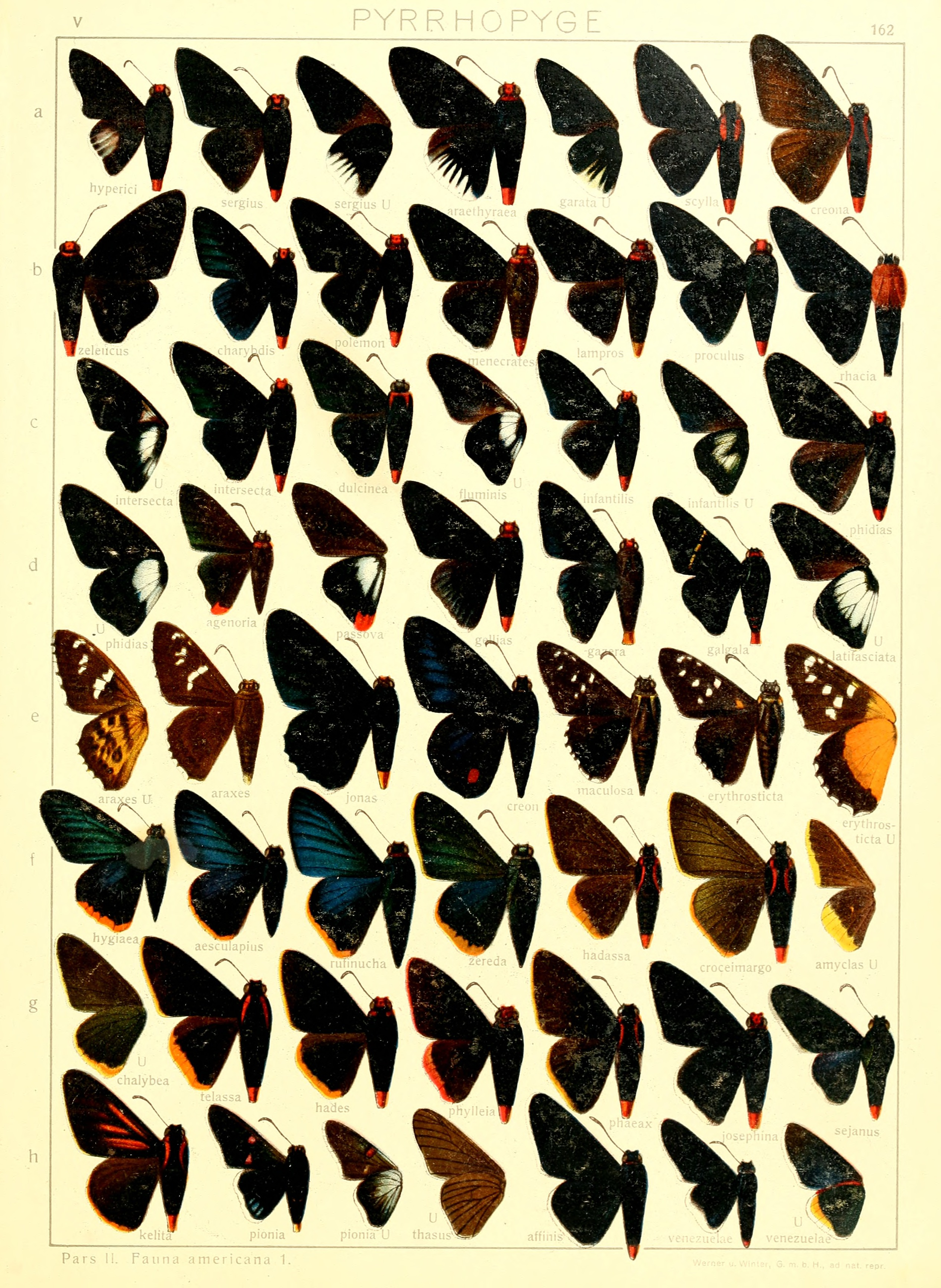
- M. maculosa and M. erythrosticta in Adalbert Seitz's Macrolepidoptera of the World

Scientific classification
- Kingdom: Animalia
- Phylum: Arthropoda
- Class: Insecta
- Order: Lepidoptera
- Family: Hesperiidae
- Genus: Melanopyge; O. Mielke, 2002

= Melanopyge =

Genus of butterflies

Melanopyge is a Neotropical genus of firetips in the family Hesperiidae.

== Species ==
- Melanopyge cossea (Druce, 1875) cossea skipper - Colombia
- Melanopyge erythrosticta (Godman & Salvin, 1879) spotted skipper - southeast Mexico to Panama
- Melanopyge hoffmanni (Freeman, 1977) Hoffmann's skipper - southeast Mexico, Belize
- Melanopyge maculosa (Hewitson, 1866) maculosa skipper - Panama, Colombia, Ecuador, Venezuela
- Melanopyge mulleri (Bell, 1934) red-spotted skipper - southeast Mexico
