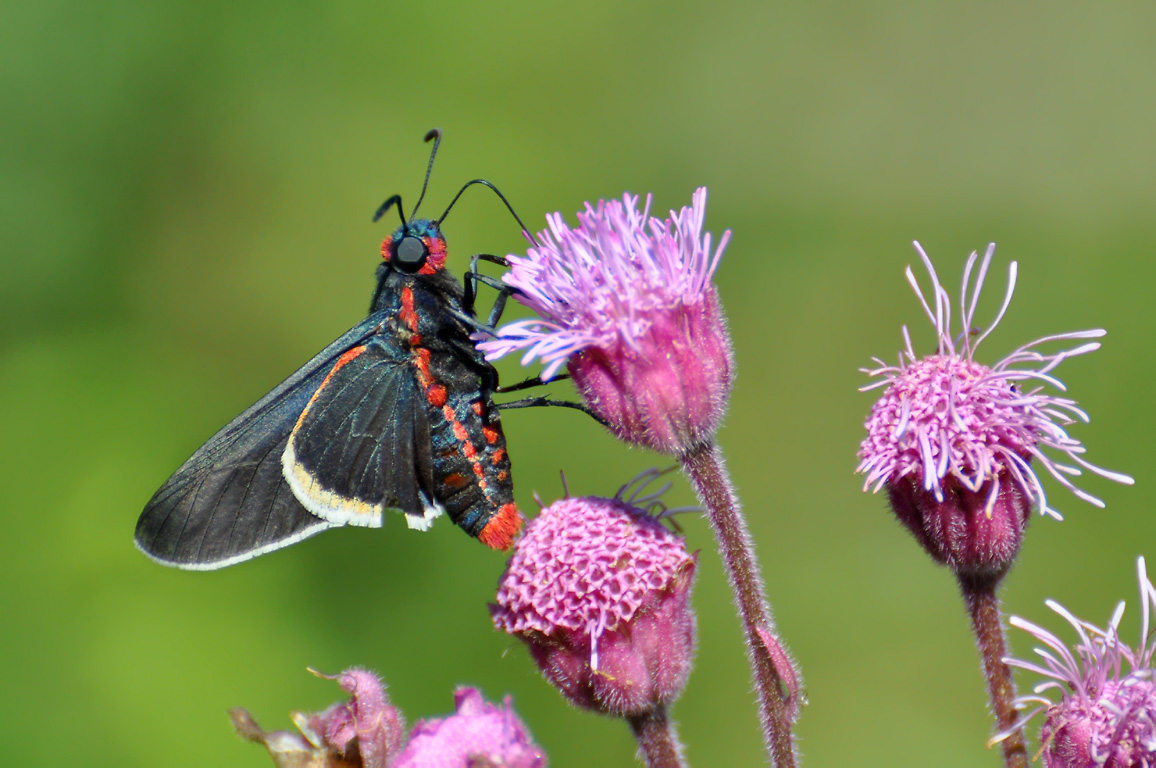
- Mysoria barcastus barta

Scientific classification
- Kingdom: Animalia
- Phylum: Arthropoda
- Class: Insecta
- Order: Lepidoptera
- Family: Hesperiidae
- Genus: Mysoria; Watson, 1893

= Mysoria =

Genus of butterflies

Mysoria is a Neotropical genus of firetips in the family Hesperiidae.

== Species list ==
- Mysoria affinis (Herrich-Schäffer, 1869) Mexico
- Mysoria amra (Hewitson, 1871) Mexico and Brazil.
- Mysoria barcastus (Sepp, [1851]) Mexico, Costa Rica, Honduras, Colombia, Venezuela, Trinidad and Tobago, Bolivia, Paraguay, Argentina, Brazil, Surinam Guyane
