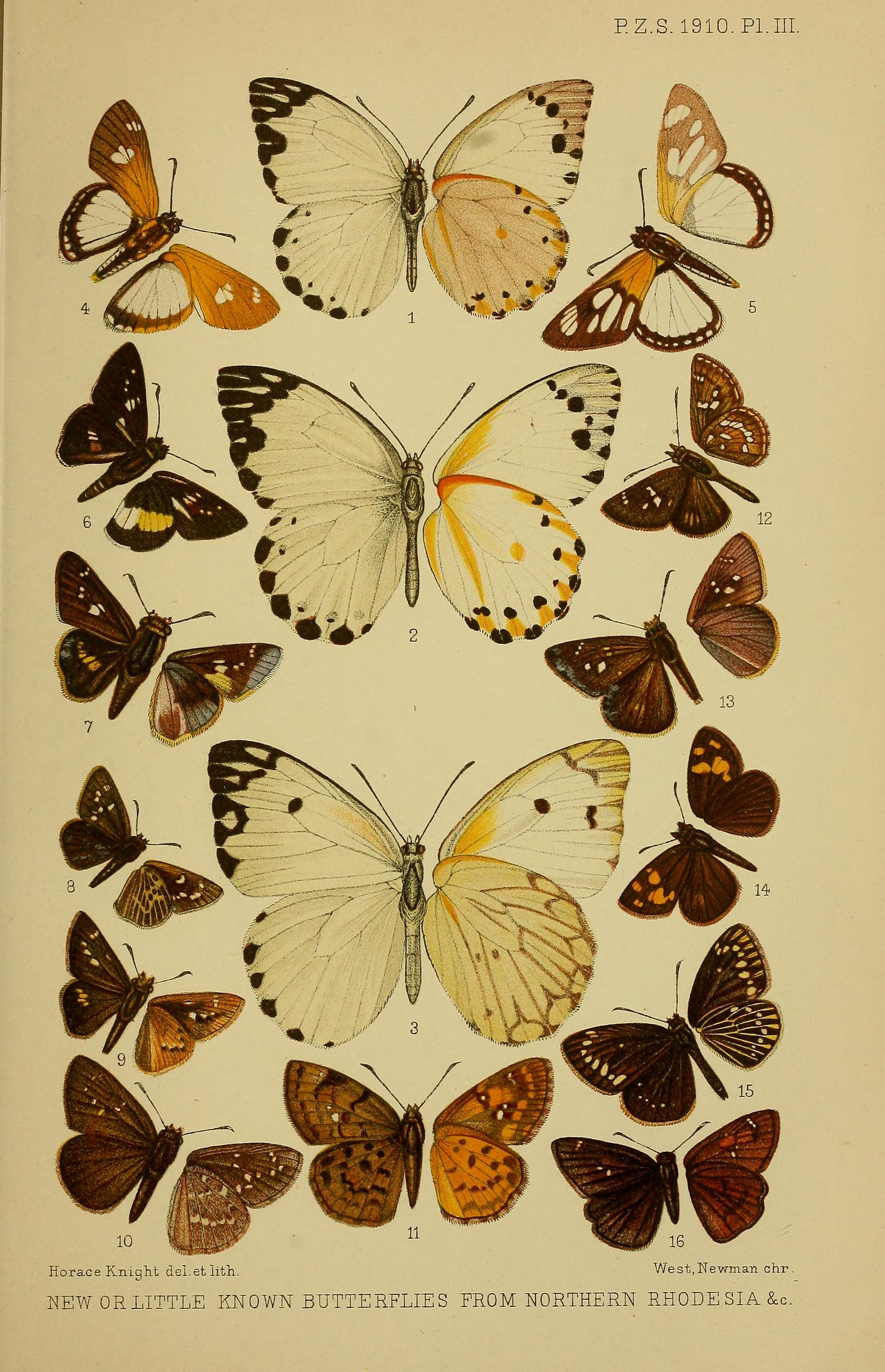
- Figure 13

Scientific classification
- Domain: Eukaryota
- Kingdom: Animalia
- Phylum: Arthropoda
- Class: Insecta
- Order: Lepidoptera
- Family: Hesperiidae
- Genus: Meza
- Species: M. larea

Binomial name
- Meza larea (Neave, 1910)

Synonyms
- Parnara larea Neave, 1910; Chapra mathias ab. hias Strand, 1921

= Meza larea =

Species of butterfly

Meza larea is a butterfly in the family Hesperiidae. They are in subfamily Hesperiinae and the tribe Aeromachini. These beautiful butterflies were found in the Democratic Republic of the Congo (Shaba), western Tanzania, Malawi and northern Zambia.

The Meza larea have many predators including lizards and birds, and are prized by collectors. These beautiful butterflies have a very long life compared to other butterflies. It is believed that the astounding colors of the Meza larea help camouflage them and help improve their chances of living longer. These particular butterflies are not symmetrical and have various coloring patterns that make them an astounding creature to come across.
