= Misius =

Scientific classification
- Kingdom: Animalia
- Phylum: Arthropoda
- Class: Insecta
- Order: Lepidoptera
- Family: Hesperiidae
- Subtribe: Moncina; Evans, 1955
- Genus: Misius; Mabille, 1891

Synonyms
- (Species): Pamphila misius Mabille, 1891

Genus of butterflies

Misius is a genus of skippers in the family Hesperiidae. It is monotypic, being represented by the single species Misius misius.
