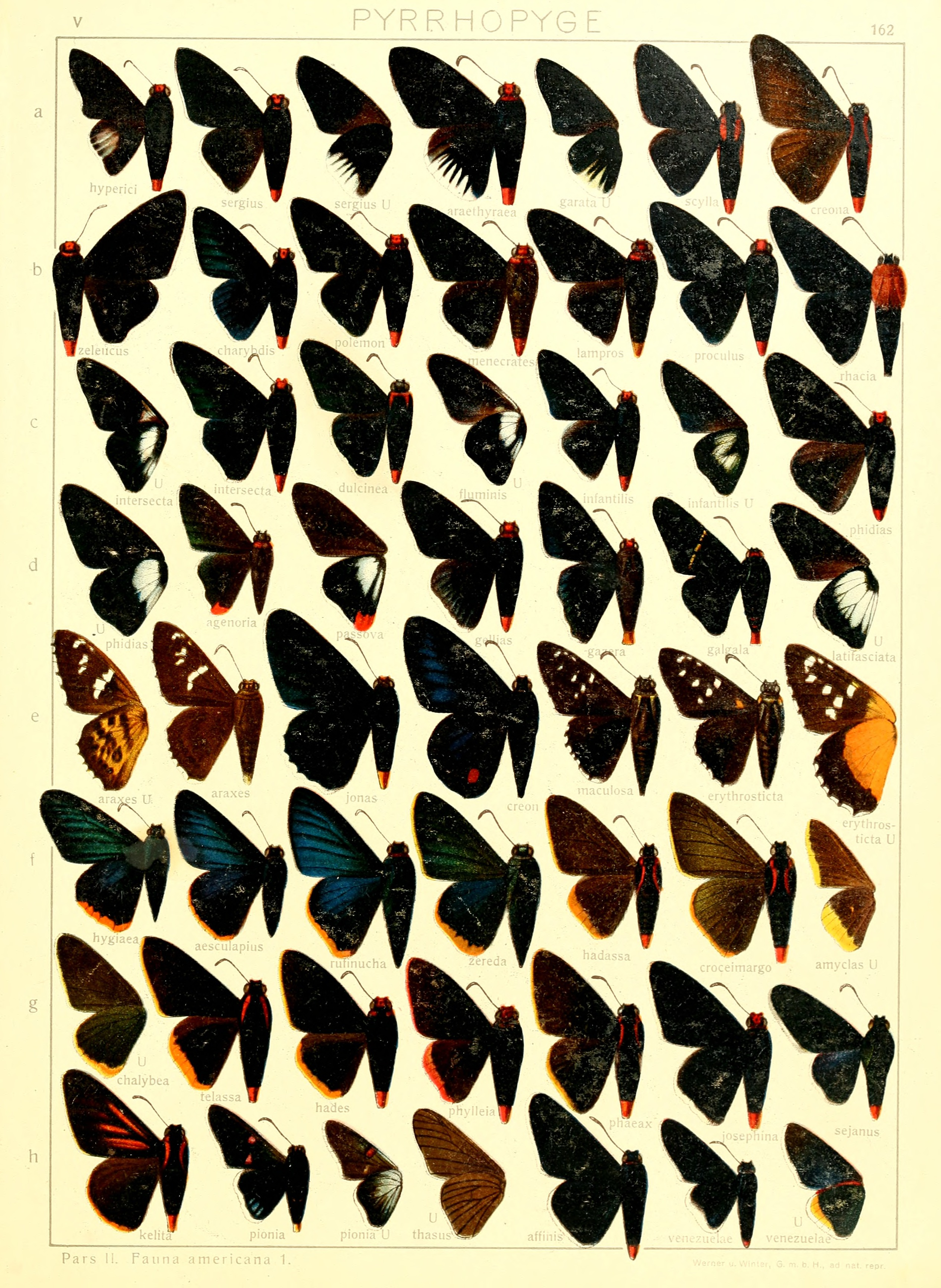
- Mysarbia sejanus depicted in Adalbert Seitz's Macrolepidoptera of the World

Scientific classification
- Kingdom: Animalia
- Phylum: Arthropoda
- Class: Insecta
- Order: Lepidoptera
- Family: Hesperiidae
- Genus: Mysarbia; Mielke, 2002
- Species: M. sejanus

Binomial name
- Mysarbia sejanus Hopffer, 1874

= Mysarbia =

Genus of butterflies

Mysarbia is a Neotropical genus of firetips in the family Hesperiidae. The genus is monotypic containing the single species Mysarbia sejanus.

== Subspecies ==
- Mysarbia sejanus sejanus Peru
- Mysarbia sejanus erythrostigma (Röber, 1925) Bolivia
- Mysarbia sejanus stolli Mielke & Casagrande, 2002 Costa Rica, Venezuela, Colombia, Suriname, French Guiana
