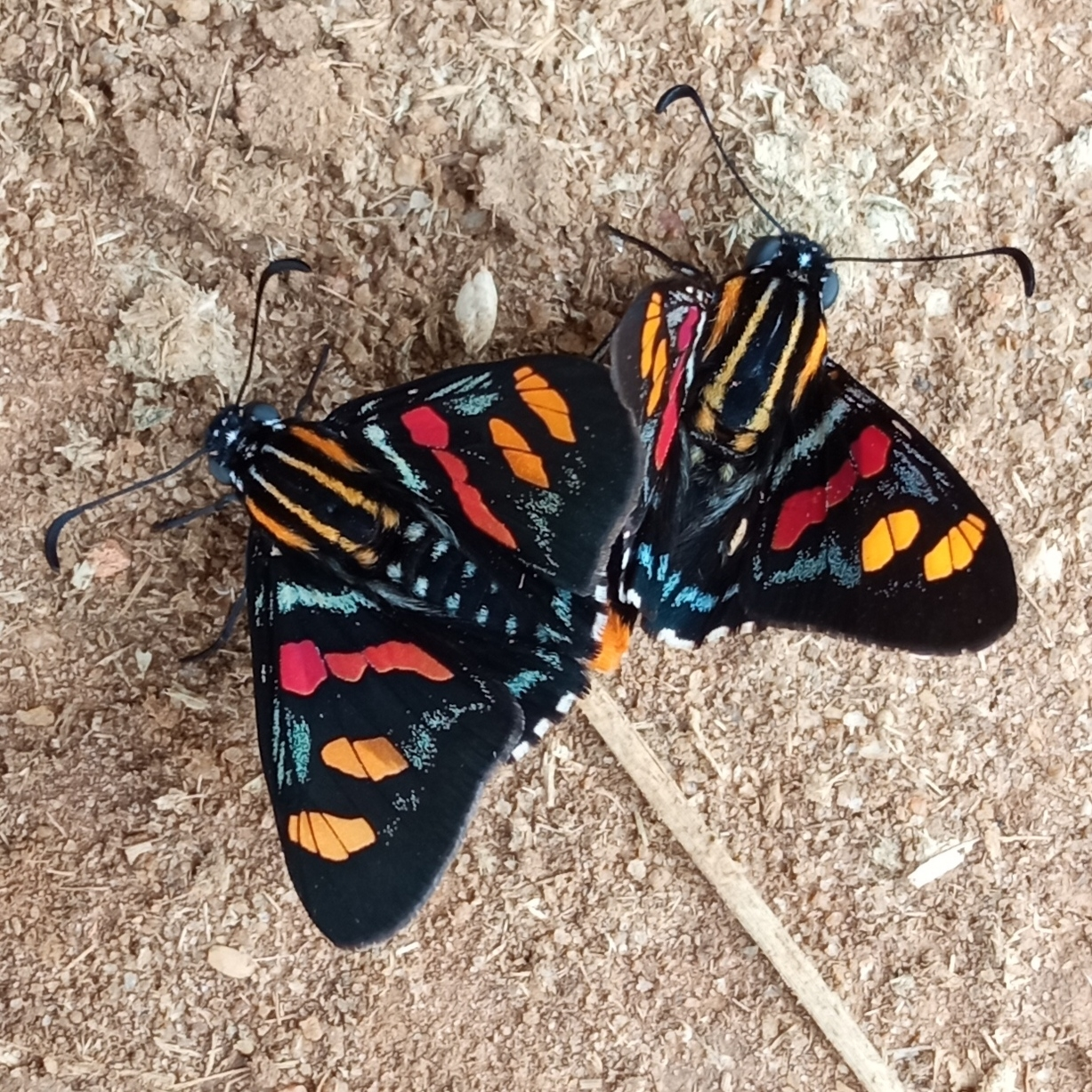
- Mimoniades versicolor

Scientific classification
- Kingdom: Animalia
- Phylum: Arthropoda
- Clade: Pancrustacea
- Class: Insecta
- Order: Lepidoptera
- Family: Hesperiidae
- Genus: Mimoniades; Hübner, 1823

= Mimoniades =

Genus of butterflies

Mimoniades is a Neotropical genus of skipper butterflies in the family Hesperiidae.

Large strong insects, the marking of which, on a black ground, corresponds to that of Jemadia, but the colour of the bands is a lighter or darker yellowish red, often with a brownish tint. The distal margin of the hindwing is only feebly undulate, but near the anal angle somewhat more distinctly dentate. On the forewing the lowest subcostal vein and the uppermost radial vein rise from the same place; the cell is shorter than half the costal margin, the transverse vein runs rectilinearly, the upper median and lower radial rise from the lower cell-angle.

== Species ==
- Mimoniades nurscia (Swainson, 1821) nursica skipper - type locality South America
  - Mimoniades nurscia nurscia (Swainson, 1821) Colombia, Ecuador, north Peru
  - Mimoniades nurscia malis (Godman & Salvin, 1879) Colombia
  - Mimoniades nurscia amans Skinner, 1920 Colombia, Peru
- Mimoniades ocyalus Hübner, 1823 ocyalus skipper - south Brazil
- Mimoniades versicolor (Latreille, [1824]) versicolor skipper - type locality Brazil
  - Mimoniades versicolor versicolor (Latreille, [1824]) Brazil
  - Mimoniades versicolor eupheme (Godman & Salvin, 1879) Ecuador, Peru, Bolivia
- Mimoniades montana J. Zikán, 1938 quadricolor skipper - southeast Brazil
- Mimoniades baroni (Godman & Salvin, 1895) Baron's skipper - Peru
