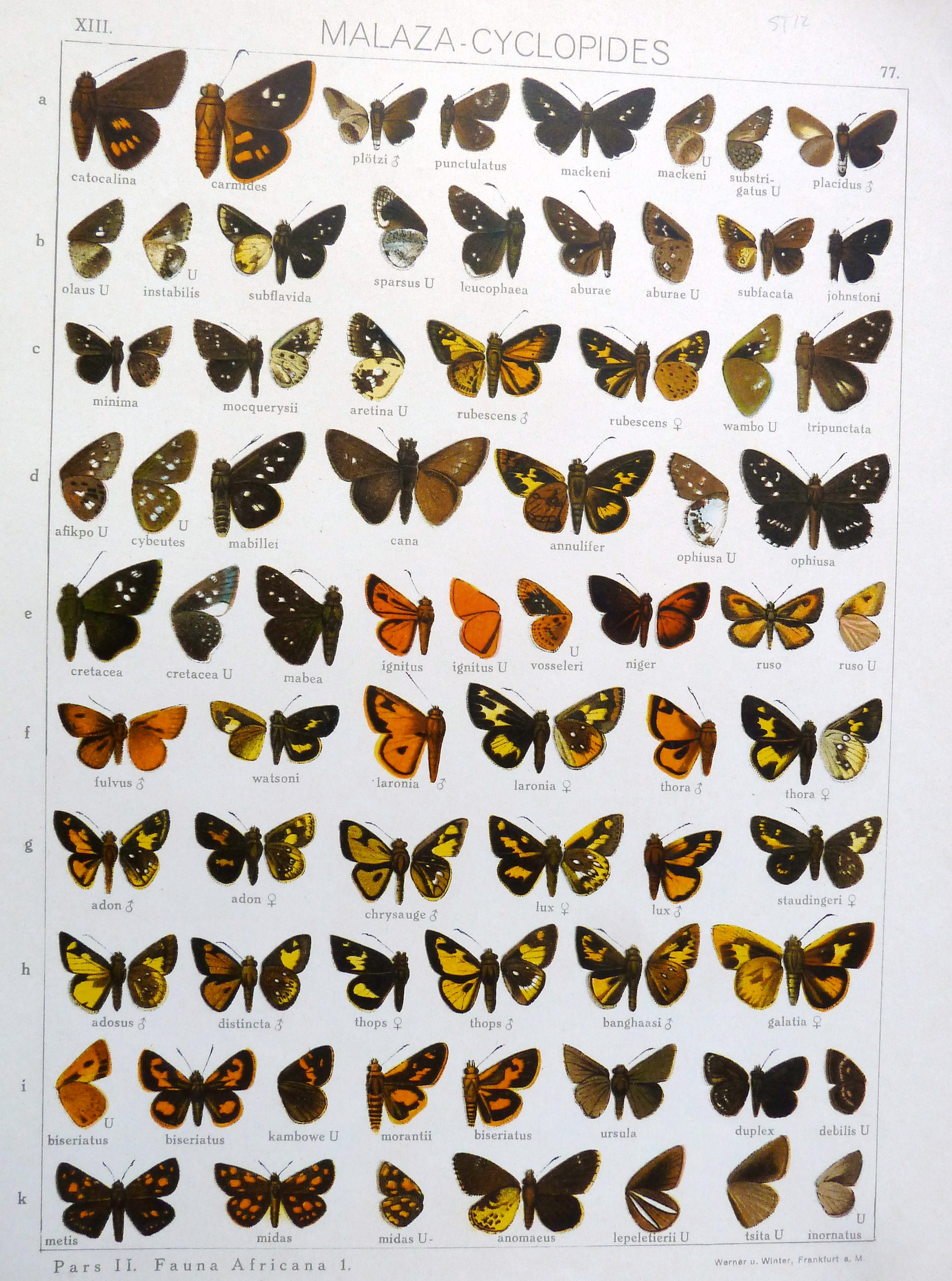

Scientific classification
- Domain: Eukaryota
- Kingdom: Animalia
- Phylum: Arthropoda
- Class: Insecta
- Order: Lepidoptera
- Family: Hesperiidae
- Genus: Meza
- Species: M. leucophaea

Binomial name
- Meza leucophaea (Holland, 1894)

Synonyms
- Parnara leucophaea Holland, 1894

= Meza leucophaea =

Species of butterfly

Meza leucophaea, the margined missile, is a butterfly in the family Hesperiidae. It is found in Senegal, Guinea, Sierra Leone, Liberia, Ivory Coast, Ghana, Nigeria, Cameroon and Gabon. The habitat consists of forests.

Adults have been recorded feeding from the blossoms of a low-growing species of Pterocarpus.

== Subspecies ==
- Meza leucophaea leucophaea (eastern Nigeria, Cameroon, Gabon)
- Meza leucophaea bassa Lindsey & Miller, 1965 (Senegal, Guinea, Sierra Leone, Liberia, Ivory Coast, Ghana, western Nigeria)
