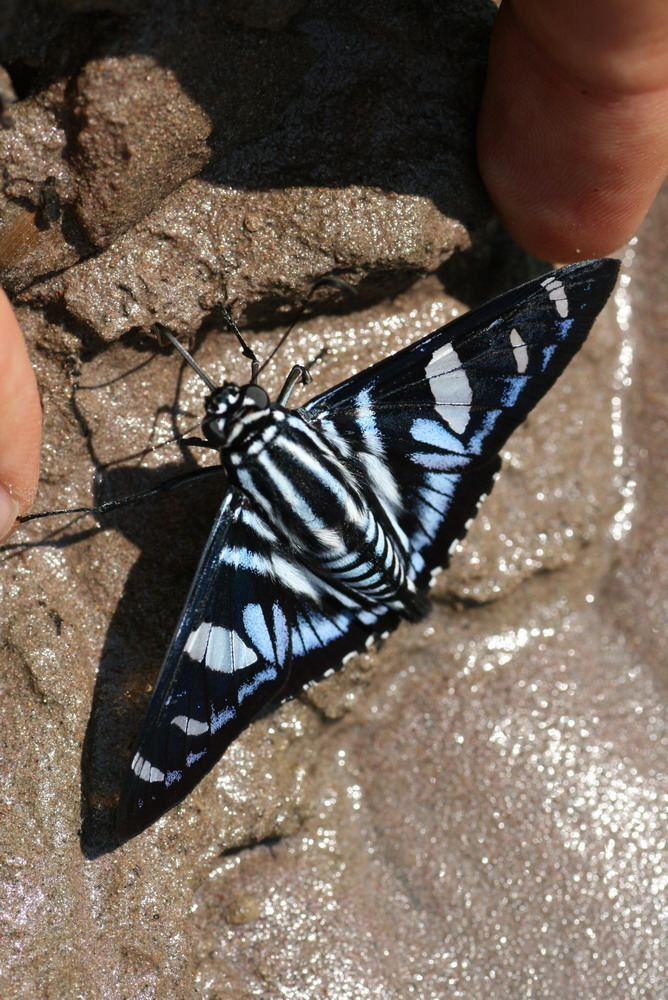
- Jemadia hewitsonii

Scientific classification
- Kingdom: Animalia
- Phylum: Arthropoda
- Class: Insecta
- Order: Lepidoptera
- Family: Hesperiidae
- Genus: Jemadia; Watson, 1893

= Jemadia =

Genus of butterflies

Jemadia is a Neotropical genus of firetips in the family Hesperiidae.

A genus of robust butterflies where it can be difficult to distinguish between the various species due to the strong resemblance between members of different lineage. There are two general forms of body markings, one exhibiting four white dots on their prothorax, the other with a white transverse streak instead, according to Mabille's division of them into "punctati" and "lineati". In general Jemadia have white or blue marking and hyaline (glass-like) spots. The hindwings are often remarkably small, in the males often with tooth-like projections on the inner-marginal and lower median vein, above them mostly with a deeply concave excision, and between the upper radial and subcostal vein often with an obtuse projection. More rarely, the hindwings are quite round. The middle radial vein is absent, the lower one comes from the lower cell-angle, the upper median vein below it separately.

== List of species ==
- Jemadia albescens Röber, 1925 - Ecuador, Peru, Bolivia
- Jemadia demarmelsi Orellana, 2010 - Demarmels' skipper - Venezuela
- Jemadia gnetus (Fabricius, 1781) - gnetus skipper - Suriname, Guyana, Venezuela, Colombia, Ecuador, Peru, Bolivia, Brazil
  - Jemadia gnetus gnetus (Fabricius, 1781) Guyanas, etc. (as above)
  - Jemadia gnetus brevipennis Schaus, 1902 - brevipennis skipper - Brazil, Paraguay
  - Jemadia gnetus mineira (O. Mielke, C. Mielke & Casagrande, 2022) - Brazil
- Jemadia hewitsonii (Mabille, 1878) - Hewitson's skipper - Brazil (Amazonas)
  - Jemadia hewitsonii hewitsonii (Mabille, 1878) - French Guiana, Venezuela, Brazil, Peru

(Note, see former Jemadia hewitsonii ovid Evans, 1951, or Jemadia hewitsonii albescens Röber, 1925)

- Jemadia hospita (Butler, 1877) - hospita skipper - Peru
  - Jemadia hospita hospita (A. Butler, 1877) - Colombia, Ecuador, Peru, Bolivia, west Brazil
  - Jemadia hospita imitator (Mabille, 1891) - Colombia
  - Jemadia hospita hephaestos (Plötz, 1879) - Suriname
- Jemadia mabillei O. Mielke, Brockmann & C. Mielke, 2022 - Venezuela, Colombia, Ecuador, etc.
- Jemadia menechmus (Mabille, 1878) - Menechmus skipper - Venezuela to Brazil
  - Jemadia menechmus desousai Orellana, 2010 - Venezuela
  - Jemadia menechmus menechmus (Mabille, 1878) - Suriname, Venezuela, Colombia, Ecuador, Peru, Bolivia, Brazil
- Jemadia ovid Evans, 1951 - ovid Skipper - Colombia, Ecuador
- Jemadia pater Evans, 1951 - pater skipper - Panama, Colombia, Venezuela
- Jemadia pseudognetus (Mabille, 1878) - dot-collared skipper - Mexico to Venezuela and Brazil
  - Jemadia pseudognetus pseudognetus (Mabille, 1878) - Mexico to Venezuela and Brazil
  - Jemadia pseudognetus imitator (Mabille, 1891) - Colombia
- Jemadia scomber Druce, 1908 - mammoth skipper - Peru
- Jemadia sosia (Mabille, 1878) - sosia skipper - Venezuela, Colombia, Ecuador, Peru, Bolivia
- Jemadia suekentonmiller Grishin, 2014 - speciesex Skipper - Costa Rica & Panama

Else: See Mimoniades fallax (Mabille, 1878) for:

- Jemadia fallax (Mabille, 1878) - fallax skipper - Brazil
  - Jemadia fallax fallax (Mabille, 1878) - Guianas, Brazil
  - Jemadia fallax fiska Evans, 1951 - Colombia
  - Jemadia fallax fida Evans, 1951 - Ecuador, Peru, Bolivia
  - Jemadia fallax solaris Hayward, 1942 - Colombia, Venezuela, Guyana, Brazil, Peru, Bolivia
