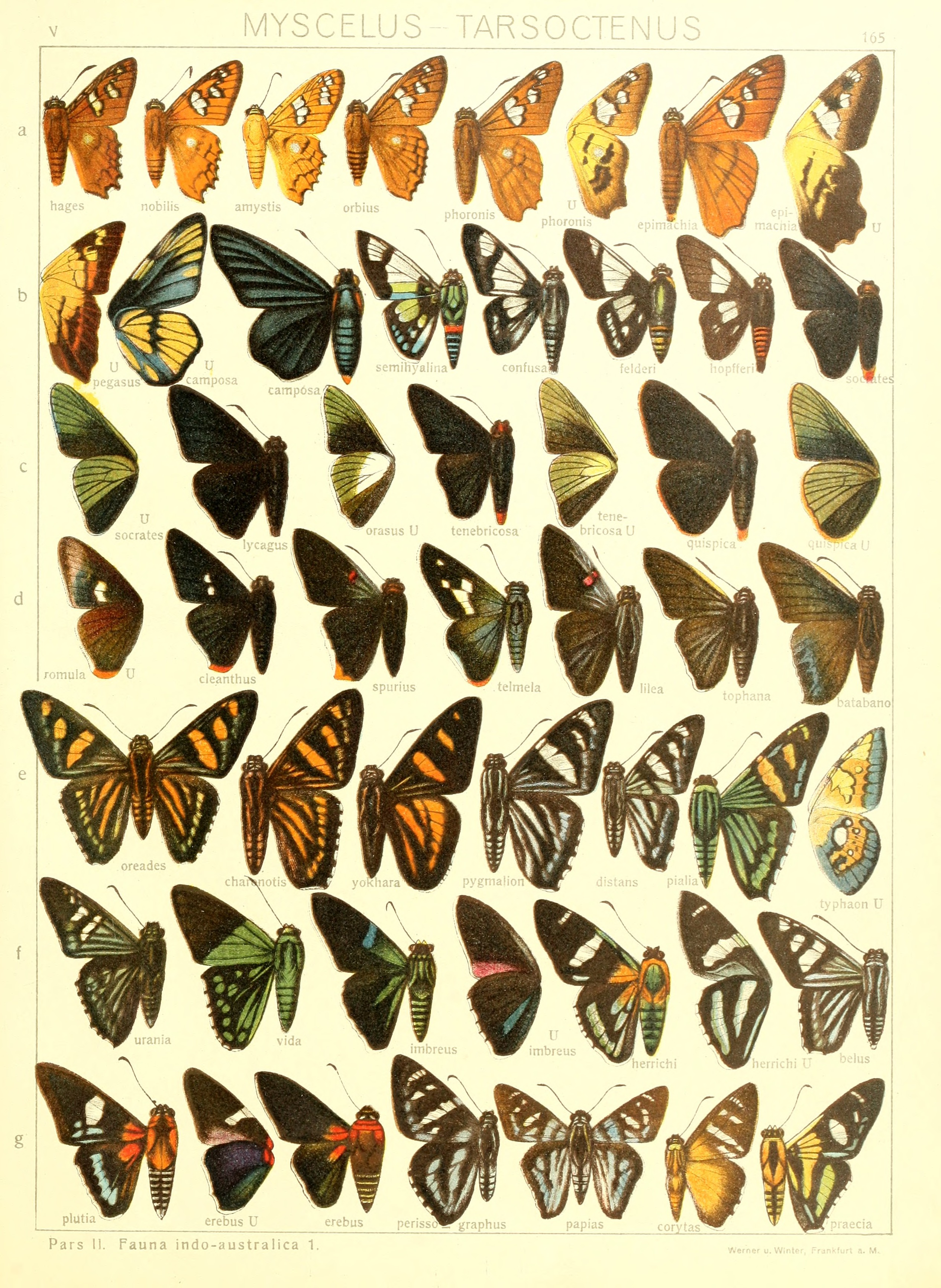
- Myscelus depicted in Seitz Macrolepidoptera of the world

Scientific classification
- Kingdom: Animalia
- Phylum: Arthropoda
- Class: Insecta
- Order: Lepidoptera
- Family: Hesperiidae
- Genus: Myscelus; Hübner, 1819

= Myscelus =

Genus of butterflies

Myscelus is a Neotropical genus of skippers in the family Hesperiidae.

== Species ==
- Myscelus amystis (Hewitson, 1867) Mexico, Guatemala, Panama, Colombia, Trinidad and Tobago, Bolivia, Ecuador, Peru, Paraguay, Argentina, Brazil.
- Myscelus assaricus (Cramer, [1779]) Mexico, Panama, Bolivia, Suriname, Guyana, Guyane.
- Myscelus belti Godman & Salvin, 1879 Mexico, Guatemala, Costa Rica, Nicaragua, Panama.
- Myscelus draudti Riley, 1926 Bolivia.
- Myscelus epimachia Herrich-Schäffer, 1869 Bolivia, Paraguay, Ecuador, Bolivia, Peru, Brazil.
- Myscelus nobilis (Cramer, [1777]) Bolivia, Peru, Suriname.
- Myscelus pardalina (C. & R. Felder, [1867]) Colombia, Ecuador, Brazil.
- Myscelus pegasus Mabille, 1903 Ecuador, Venezuela, French Guiana.
- Myscelus perissodora Dyar, 1914 Mexico, Colombia.
- Myscelus phoronis (Hewitson, 1867) Colombia, Venezuela, Bolivia, Peru.
- Myscelus santhilarius (Latreille, [1824]) Brazil, Suriname, Guyana, French Guiana.
