= List of hesperiid genera: P =

The large Lepidoptera family Hesperiidae (skippers) contains the following genera:

A B C D E F G H I J K L M N O P Q R S T U V W X Y Z

- Paches
- Pachyneuria
- Pachyrhopala
- Paduka
- Pamba
- Pamphilida
- Pamphilites
- Panca
- Panoquina
- Pansydia
- Papias
- Paracarystus
- Parachoranthus
- Paracleros
- Paradopaea
- Paradros
- Paraides
- Paramimus
- Parasovia
- Paratrytone
- Pardaleodes
- Parelbella
- Parnara
- Paronymus
- Parosmodes
- Parphorus
- Pasma
- Passova
- Pastria
- Patlasingha
- Peba
- Pedesta
- Pellicia
- Pelopidas
- Pemara
- Penicula
- Pereneia
- Perichares
- Perrotia
- Phanes
- Phanus
- Phareas
- Phemiades
- Pheraeus
- Philoodus
- Phlebodes
- Phocides
- Phoenicops
- Pholisora
- Phycanassa
- Physalea
- Pintara
- Pirdana
- Piruna
- Pisola
- Pithauria
- Pithauriopsis
- Plagiothyrus
- Plastingia
- Platylesches
- Ploetzia
- Plumbago
- Poanes
- Poanopsis
- Pola
- Polites
- Polyctor
- Polygonus
- Polythrix
- Polytremis
- Pompeius
- Porphyrogenes
- Potamanaxas
- Potanthus
- Prada
- Problema
- Procampta
- Procidosa
- Proeidosa
- Propapias
- Propertius
- Prosopalpus
- Proteides
- Protelbella
- Prusiana
- Pseudoborbo
- Pseudocoladenia
- Pseudocopaeodes
- Pseudocroniades
- Pseudodrephalys
- Pseudokerana
- Pseudopirdana
- Pseudosarbia
- Psolos
- Psoralis
- Pteroteinon
- Pterygospidea
- Pudicitia
- Punta
- Pyrdalus
- Pyrgus
- Pyroneura
- Pyrrhiades
- Pyrrhocalles
- Pyrrhochalcia
- Pyrrhopyge
- Pyrrhopygopsis
- Pyrrhosidia
- Pythonides
