= Yellow-banded skipper =

Yellow-banded skipper may refer to the following butterflies of the family Hesperiidae:

- Pyrgus sidae of the Iberian Peninsula
- Potamanaxas flavofasciata of Ecuador, Peru and Bolivia
- Pseudocroniades machaon of Brazil
