= Pedestes =

Pedestes can refer to two obsolete genus names for animals:

- Pedestes Gray, 1842, a synonym of Pedetes Illiger, 1811 (springhares)
- Pedestes Watson, 1893, not Gray, 1842, replaced by Pedesta Hemming, 1934 (Lepidoptera)
