= Thestias =

Thestias or variant, may refer to:

- Ixias, an alternate name for this butterfly genus
- Thestias (planet), an IAU-approved name for Pollux b
- Thestius (Θέστιος), a name originating from Greek Mythology, whose patronymic form is "Thestias"

== See also ==
- Scaptesyle thestias (S. thestias), a moth species
- Potamanaxas thestia (P. thestia), a butterfly species
- Compsodrillia thestia (C. thestia), a sea snail species
- Anmenopsyche thestis (A. thestis), a moth species
