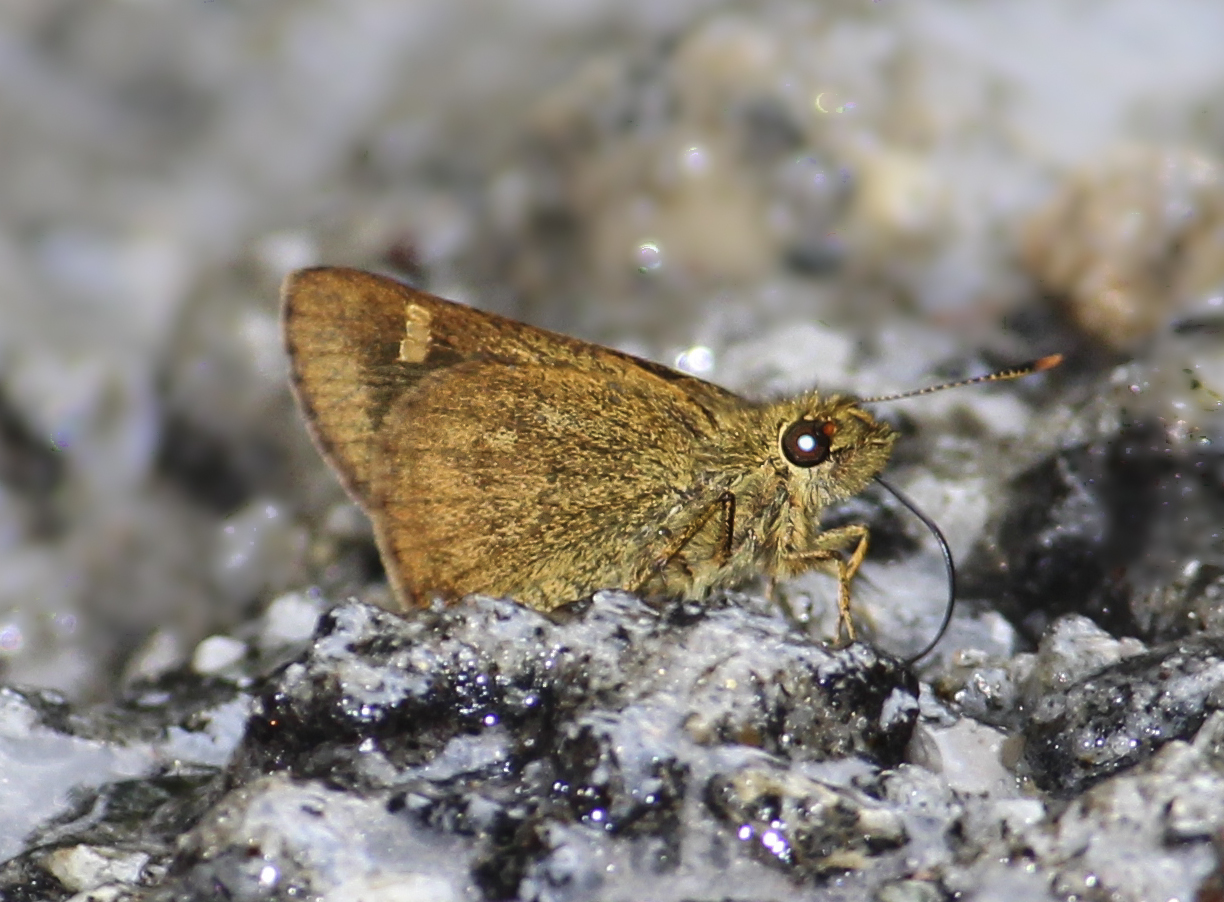
- Lateral view
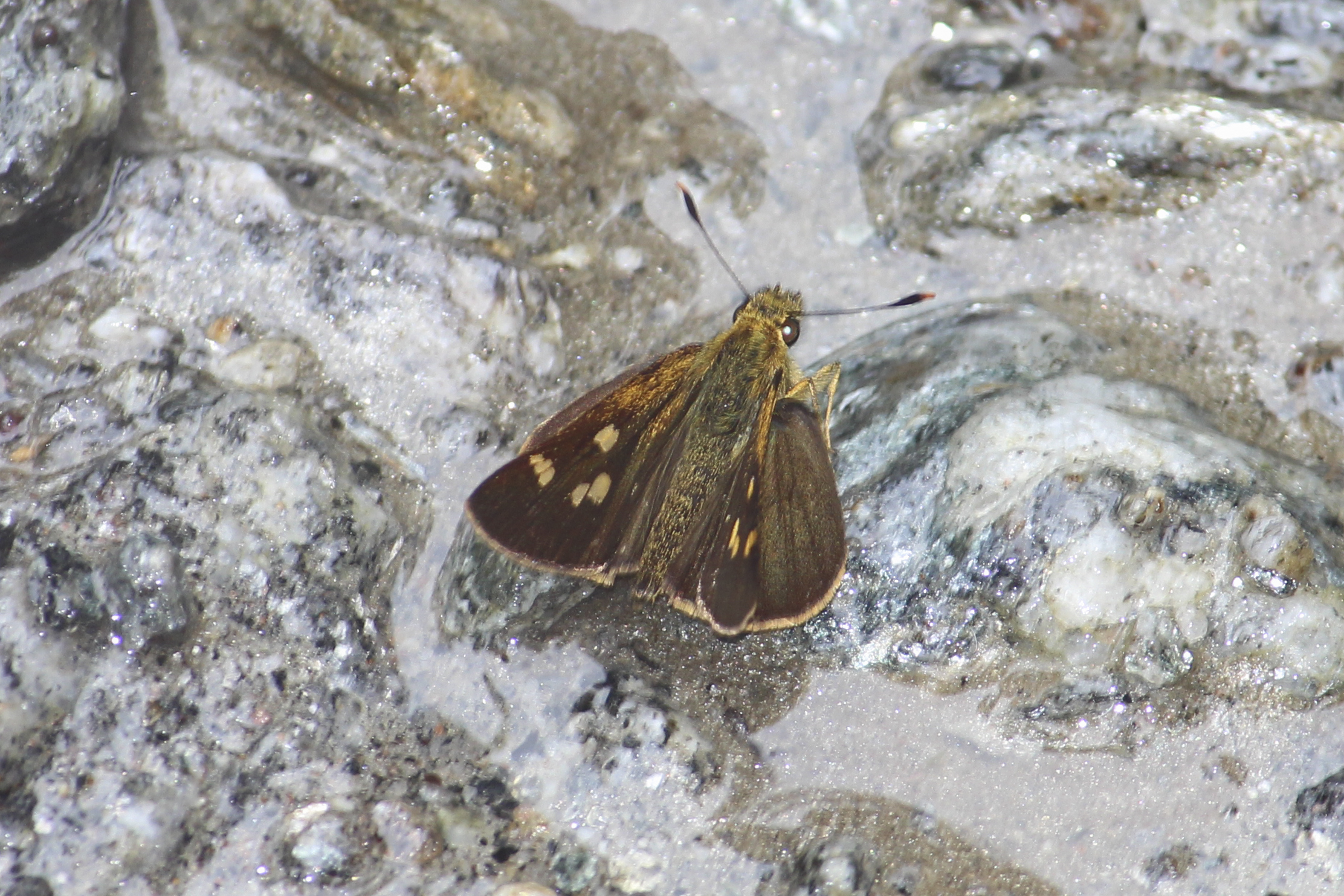
- Dorsal view

Scientific classification
- Kingdom: Animalia
- Phylum: Arthropoda
- Class: Insecta
- Order: Lepidoptera
- Family: Hesperiidae
- Genus: Pedesta
- Species: P. pandita

Binomial name
- Pedesta pandita (de Nicéville, 1885)

Synonyms
- Thoressa pandita de Nicéville, 1885

= Pedesta pandita =

Brown bush bob Pedesta pandita

Butterfly species

Pedesta pandita, the brown bush bob, is a species of skipper, a butterfly belonging to the family Hesperiidae. The species was first described by Lionel de Nicéville in 1885.

== Description ==
The wingspan of the brown bush bob is 25–30 mm (1.0–1.2 in).

In 1891, in his Hesperiidae Indica, Edward Yerbury Watson wrote:

Upperside brown, sparsely clothed with ochreous scales. Forewing with a quadrate transverse spot at the end of the cell, three conjoined subapical ones, and two similar discal ones, semi-diaphanous ochreous. Cilia ochreous. Hindwing immaculate. Underside brown, forewing with the apex widely, and the costa and the entire hindwing ferruginous ochreous. Forewing with the spots as above.

Hindwing with a very indistinct small black spot at the end of the cell, and a discal series of similar short streaks between the nervules. Cilia ochreous.

Antennae black, the tip of the club and the upper portion of the shaft below the club ferruginous.

== Distribution and habitat ==
The brown bush bob is distributed from Sikkim to Arunachal Pradesh in India and is also found in Myanmar. The flight of this infrequently seen species is fast and determined but not that fast as other fast-flying skippers. They usually fly close to the ground, and after a quick flight, will settle down in a preferred spot. They are usually spotted in wet soil or damp rock and are also found extracting nutrients from a bird droppings. Occasionally they will bask in the sun, opening their wings half-closed like other skippers. They are predominantly found in the lower elevation forest tracks or sometimes can be spotted near streams or falls.

== Seasonality ==
The brown bush bob is best seen from April to October.
