= Ectomis teutas =

Scientific classification
- Kingdom: Animalia
- Phylum: Arthropoda
- Class: Insecta
- Order: Lepidoptera
- Family: Hesperiidae
- Genus: Ectomis
- Species: E. teutas

Binomial name
- Ectomis teutas (Hewitson, 1876)

Synonyms
- Hypocryptothrix teutas (Hewitson, 1876)

Genus of butterflies

Ectomis teutas is a Neotropical species of butterfly in the family Hesperiidae (Eudaminae).
