= Paracleros maesseni =

Scientific classification
- Domain: Eukaryota
- Kingdom: Animalia
- Phylum: Arthropoda
- Class: Insecta
- Order: Lepidoptera
- Family: Hesperiidae
- Genus: Paracleros
- Species: P. maesseni

Binomial name
- Paracleros maesseni Berger, 1978

Species of butterfly

Paracleros maesseni, Maessen's dusky dart, is a butterfly in the family Hesperiidae. It is found in Ghana and Nigeria (the Cross River loop).
