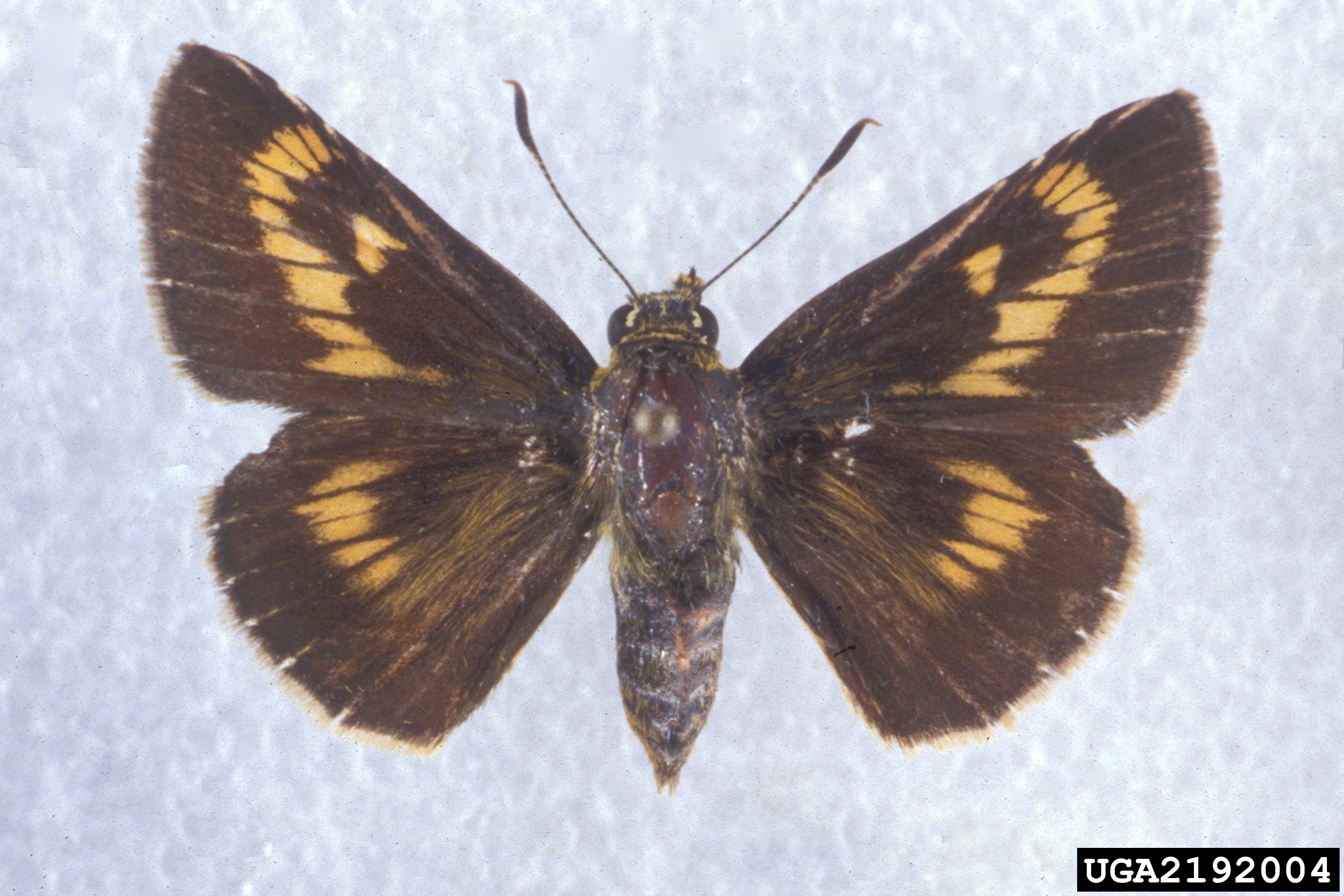
- Male
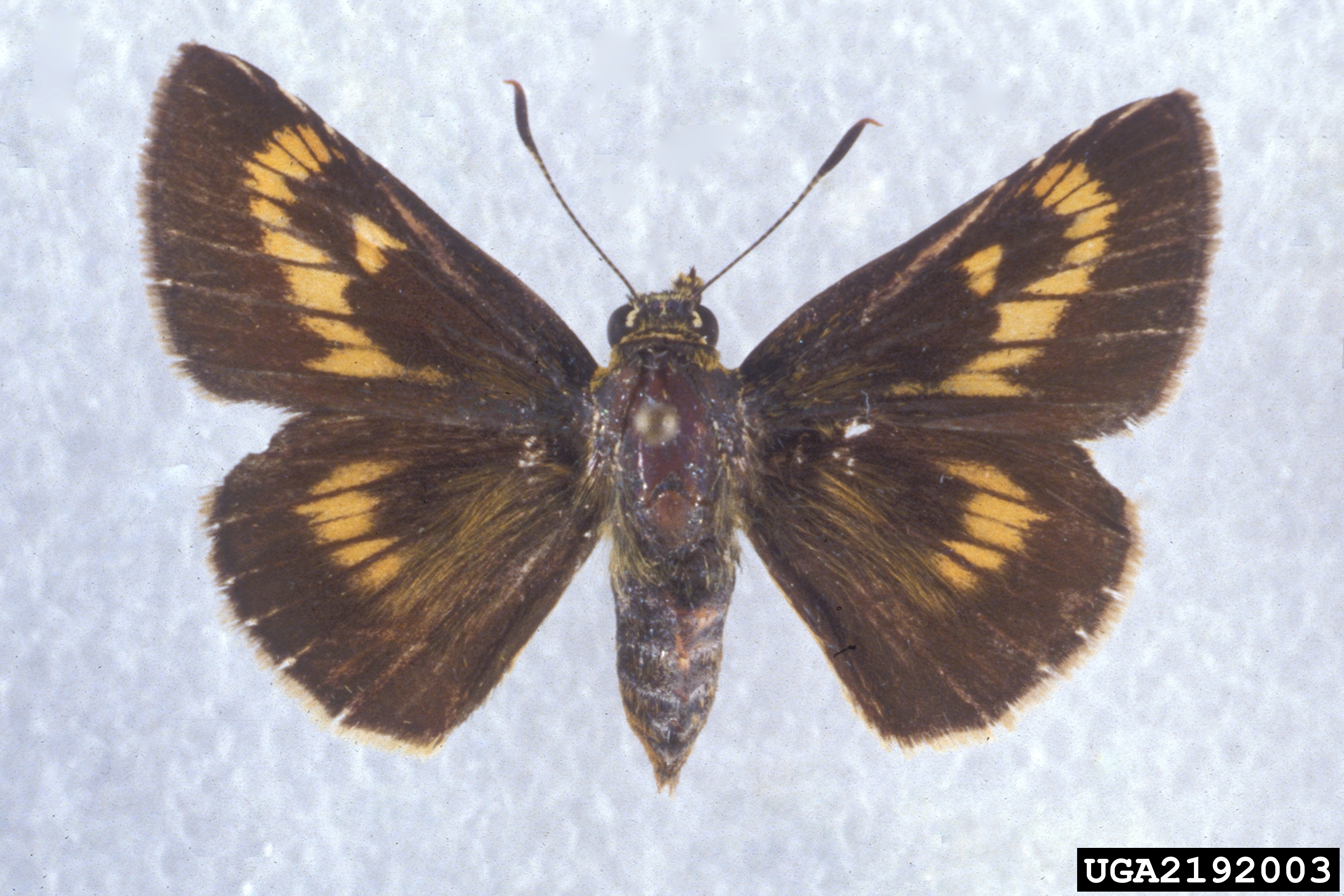
- Female

Conservation status
- Apparently Secure (NatureServe)

Scientific classification
- Kingdom: Animalia
- Phylum: Arthropoda
- Class: Insecta
- Order: Lepidoptera
- Family: Hesperiidae
- Genus: Problema
- Species: P. byssus

Binomial name
- Problema byssus (Edwards, 1880)

Synonyms
- Pamphila byssus Edwards, 1880; Limochroes byssus

= Problema byssus =

Species of butterfly

Problema byssus, the byssus skipper or bunchgrass skipper, is a butterfly of the family Hesperiidae. It is found along the Atlantic coastal plain of North America, from North Carolina south to Florida and the Gulf States and from northern Indiana west to Iowa and south to Missouri and Kansas.

== Description ==
The Byssus Skipper is a medium-sized butterfly with a wingspan ranging from 3.7 to 4.6 cm. Its upper wings are bright yellow-orange bordered with black, giving the illusion of a central patch. The underside of the forewings maintains the yellow-orange hue, while the hindwings are dull yellow in males and rust-colored in females. A band of pale spots is typically visible on the hindwings.

The wingspan is 37–46 mm.

The larvae feed on Tripsacum dactyloides.

== Lifecycle and behaviour ==
- eggs laid singly on host plant leaves
- larvae feed on eastern gammagrass (Trypsacum dactyloides) and big bluestem (Andropogon gerardii) sheltering in silk-tied leaves
- pupation occurs in leaf litter within silk cocoons
- adult diet: nectar from various wildflowers, including pickerelweed
- flight periods:
- midwest - one brood from June to July southeast - two broods from May to September, occasionally extending into October

== Distribution and habitat ==
The species exhibits a disjunct distribution across three regions in North America:

1. Atlantic coastal plain from North Carolina south through Florida and Gulf states
2. Midwestern tallgrass prairie from northern Indiana to Iowa, Missouri, and Kansas
3. Localized prairie fragments such as Nebraska's southeastern counties https://nebraskalepidoptera.com/byssus2/

Habitats include tallgrass prairies in the Midwest and moist grassy wetlands —e.g., marsh edges, wet pine savannas—along the Atlantic coast

== Conservation status ==
NatureServe ranks Problema byssus as G3–G4 (rare or locally threatened). At the state level, populations in Nebraska are considered critically imperiled (S1) . Conservation measures focus on preserving tallgrass prairie and wetland habitats with host-grass clumps and cautious use of fire .

== Subspecies ==
- Problema byssus byssus
- Problema byssus kumskaka (Scudder, 1887)
