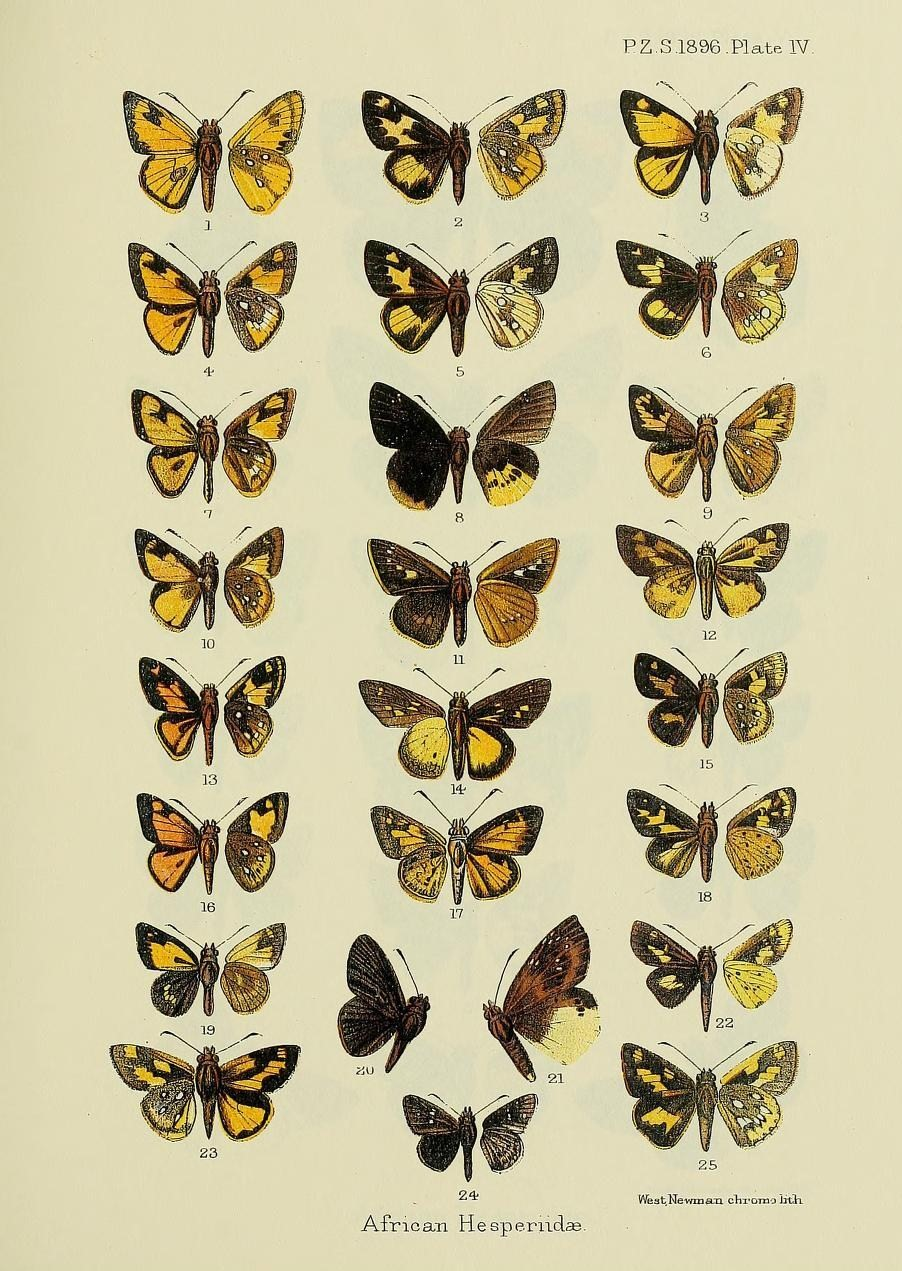
- Parosmodes lentiginosa figure 22

Scientific classification
- Kingdom: Animalia
- Phylum: Arthropoda
- Clade: Pancrustacea
- Class: Insecta
- Order: Lepidoptera
- Family: Hesperiidae
- Genus: Parosmodes
- Species: P. lentiginosa

Binomial name
- Parosmodes lentiginosa (Holland, 1896)

Synonyms
- Kedestes lentiginosa Holland, 1896

= Parosmodes lentiginosa =

Species of butterfly

Parosmodes lentiginosa, the rare Morant skipper, is a butterfly in the family Hesperiidae. It is found in Sierra Leone, Liberia, Ivory Coast, Ghana, Nigeria (the Cross River loop), Cameroon, Gabon, Angola, the Central African Republic and the Democratic Republic of the Congo. The habitat consists of forests and forest/savanna mosaic.

Torben Larsen developed a species numbering system for his 2005 publication Butterflies of West Africa. This species is #1321. The 'Larsen' numbers have since been used with permission in A Sharp Eye on Butterflies of Ghana.
