= Sebastonyma perbella =

Scientific classification
- Kingdom: Animalia
- Phylum: Arthropoda
- Class: Insecta
- Order: Lepidoptera
- Family: Hesperiidae
- Genus: Sebastonyma
- Species: S. perbella

Binomial name
- Sebastonyma perbella (Hering, 1918)

Synonyms
- Halpe perbella Hering, 1918; Parasovia perbella (Hering, 1918)

Genus of butterflies

Sebastonyma perbella is a species of grass skipper in the family Hesperiidae. It is found in China.
