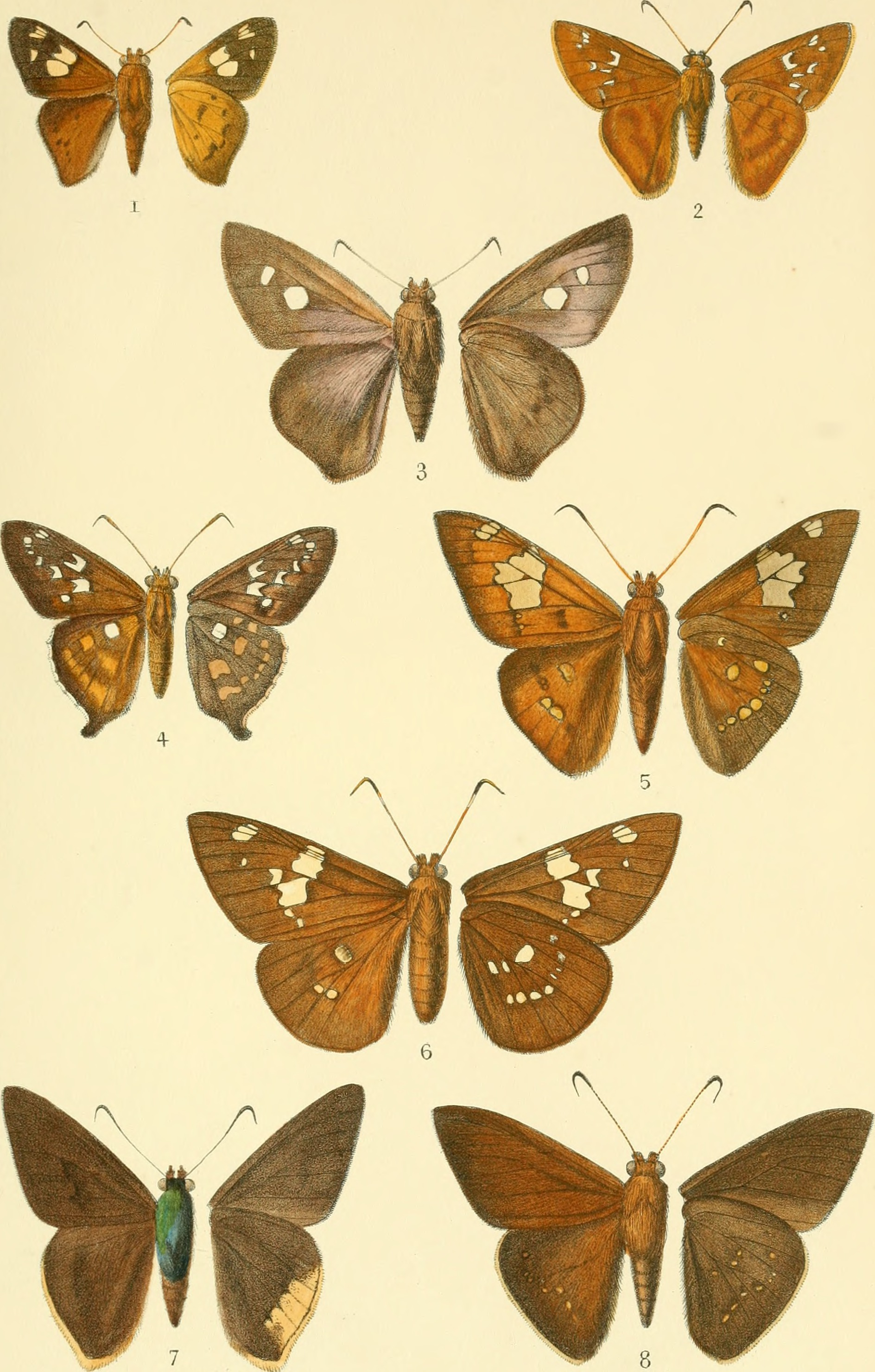
- Ectomis labriaris figure 4

Scientific classification
- Kingdom: Animalia
- Phylum: Arthropoda
- Class: Insecta
- Order: Lepidoptera
- Family: Hesperiidae
- Genus: Ectomis
- Species: E. labriaris

Binomial name
- Ectomis labriaris (Butler, 1877)

Synonyms
- Heronia labriaris (Butler, 1877)

= Ectomis labriaris =

Genus of butterflies

Ectomis labriaris is a Neotropical species of skippers in the subfamily Eudaminae. It is found in Brazil (Amazonas, Bahia).
