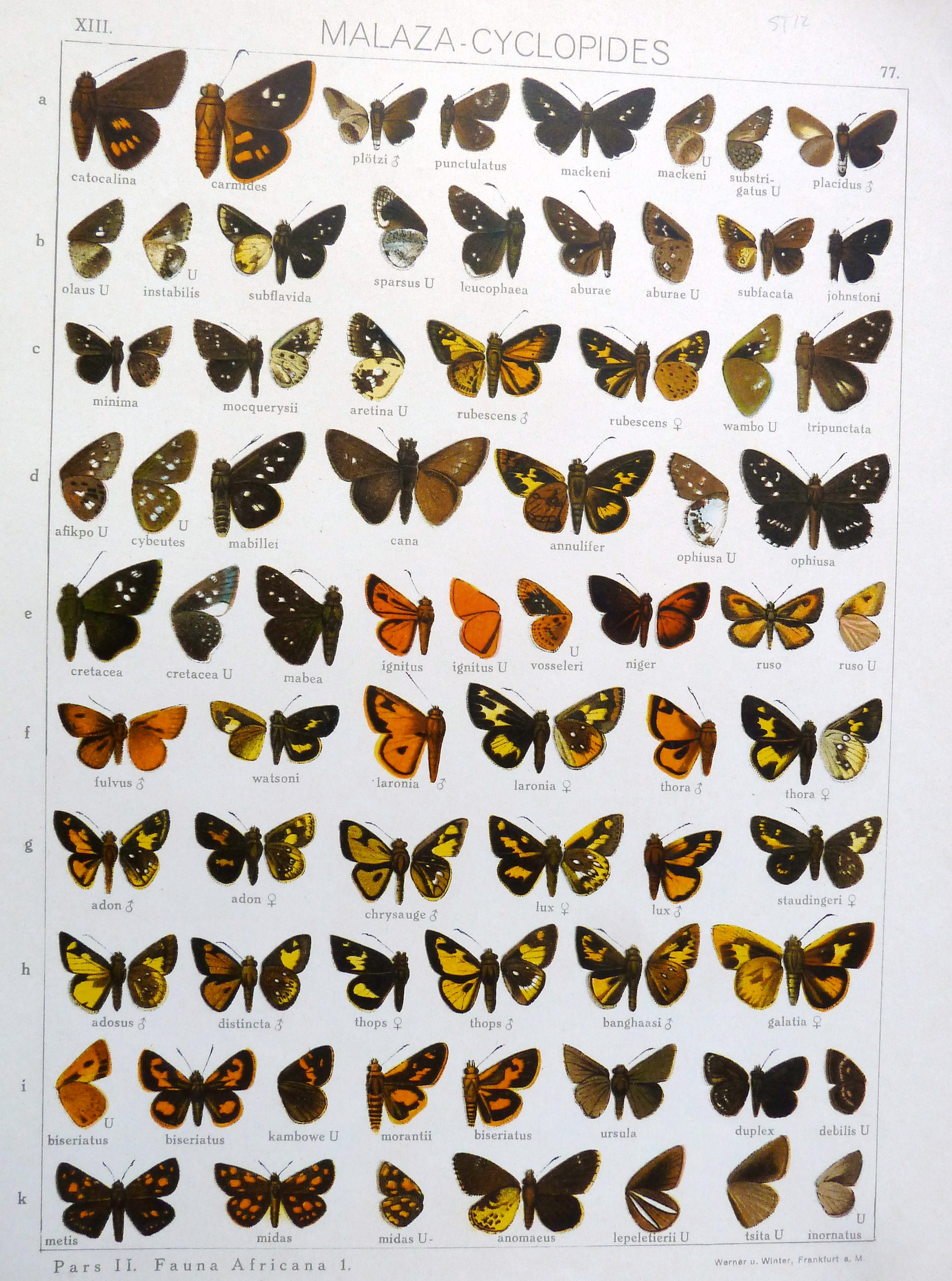

Scientific classification
- Domain: Eukaryota
- Kingdom: Animalia
- Phylum: Arthropoda
- Class: Insecta
- Order: Lepidoptera
- Family: Hesperiidae
- Genus: Paracleros
- Species: P. substrigata

Binomial name
- Paracleros substrigata (Holland, 1893)

Synonyms
- Acleros substrigata Holland, 1893; Paracleros overlaeti Berger, 1978

= Paracleros substrigata =

Species of butterfly

Paracleros substrigata, Berger's dusky dart, is a butterfly in the family Hesperiidae. It is found in Ivory Coast, Ghana, Nigeria, Cameroon, Gabon, the Central African Republic, the Democratic Republic of the Congo and western Tanzania. The habitat consists of forests.
