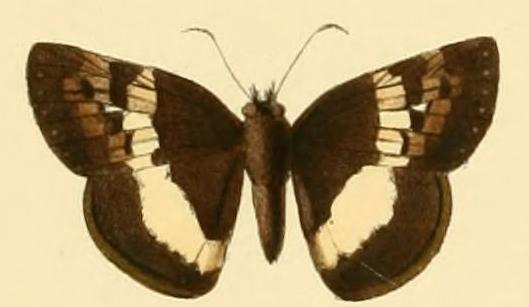

Scientific classification
- Kingdom: Animalia
- Phylum: Arthropoda
- Class: Insecta
- Order: Lepidoptera
- Family: Hesperiidae
- Genus: Potamanaxas
- Species: P. latrea

Binomial name
- Potamanaxas latrea (Hewitson, 1875)

Synonyms
- Leucochitonea latrea Hewitson, 1875; Potamanax caliadne Godman & Salvin, [1895]; Potomanaxas latrea tusca Evans, 1953; Potomanaxas latrea tyndarus Evans, 1953

= Potamanaxas latrea =

Species of butterfly

Potamanaxas latrea, the latrea skipper, is a butterfly in the family Hesperiidae. It is found in Ecuador, Peru, Nicaragua and Costa Rica.

== Subspecies ==
- Potamanaxas latrea latrea (Nicaragua)
- Potamanaxas latrea caliadne (Godman & Salvin, [1895]) (Costa Rica)
- Potamanaxas latrea tusca Evans, 1953 (Ecuador, Peru)
- Potamanaxas latrea tyndarus Evans, 1953 (Peru)
