= Paracleros staudei =

Scientific classification
- Kingdom: Animalia
- Phylum: Arthropoda
- Class: Insecta
- Order: Lepidoptera
- Family: Hesperiidae
- Genus: Paracleros
- Species: P. staudei

Binomial name
- Paracleros staudei Collins & Larsen, 2000

Species of butterfly

Paracleros staudei is a butterfly in the family Hesperiidae. It is found in western Kenya (the Kakamega Forest). The habitat consists of forests.
