= Parosmodes onza =

Scientific classification
- Domain: Eukaryota
- Kingdom: Animalia
- Phylum: Arthropoda
- Class: Insecta
- Order: Lepidoptera
- Family: Hesperiidae
- Genus: Parosmodes
- Species: P. onza

Binomial name
- Parosmodes onza Evans, 1956

Species of butterfly

Parosmodes onza is a butterfly in the family Hesperiidae. It is found in Uganda.
