= Paracleros biguttulus =

Scientific classification
- Domain: Eukaryota
- Kingdom: Animalia
- Phylum: Arthropoda
- Class: Insecta
- Order: Lepidoptera
- Family: Hesperiidae
- Genus: Paracleros
- Species: P. biguttulus

Binomial name
- Paracleros biguttulus (Mabille, 1890)

Synonyms
- Acleros biguttulus Mabille, 1890

Species of butterfly

Paracleros biguttulus, the common dusky dart, is a butterfly in the family Hesperiidae. It is found in Sierra Leone, Liberia, Ivory Coast, Ghana, Nigeria, Cameroon, the Democratic Republic of the Congo, Uganda, western Kenya, western Tanzania and Zambia. The habitat consists of forests.
