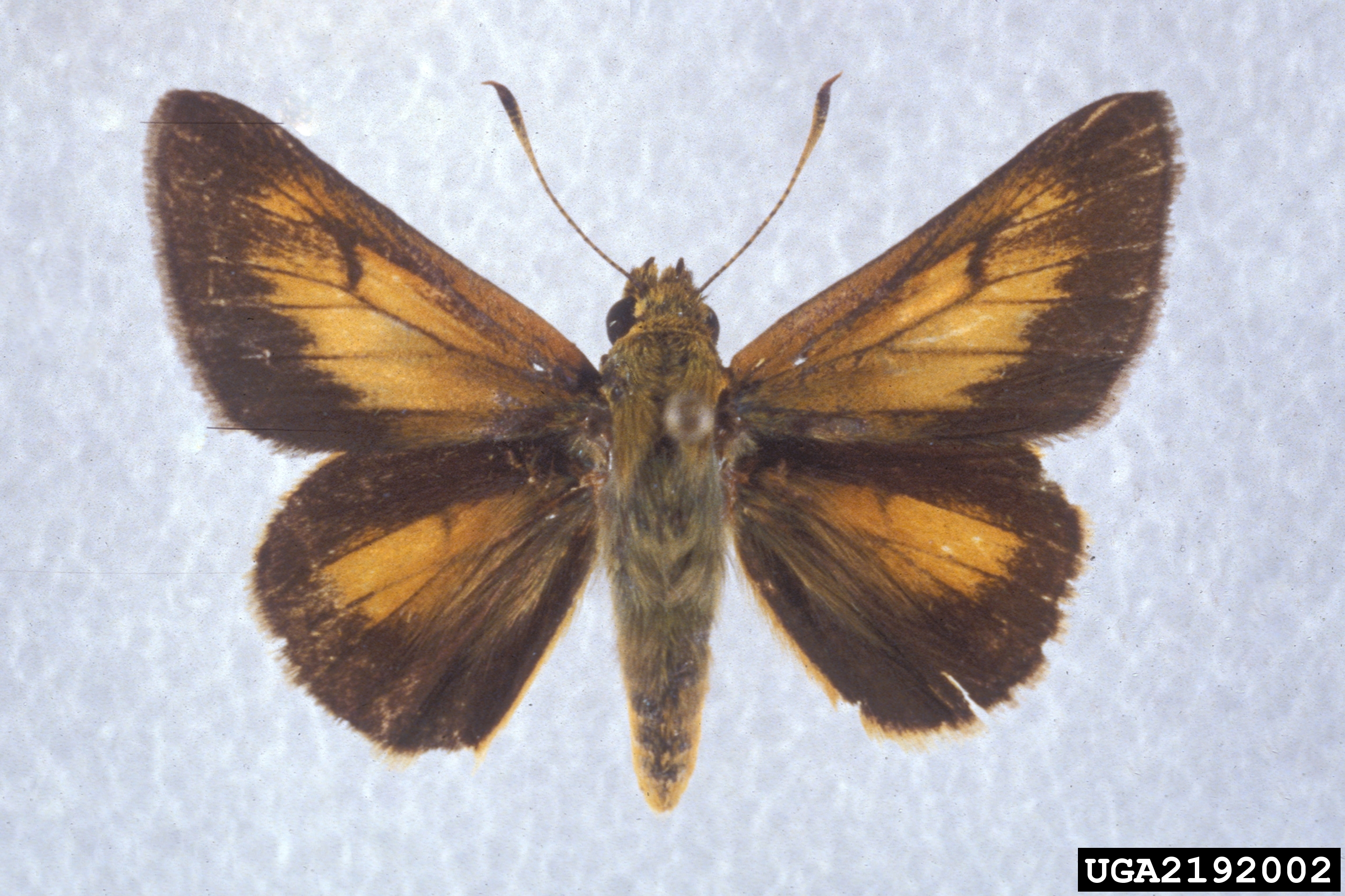

Conservation status
- Vulnerable (NatureServe)

Scientific classification
- Domain: Eukaryota
- Kingdom: Animalia
- Phylum: Arthropoda
- Class: Insecta
- Order: Lepidoptera
- Family: Hesperiidae
- Genus: Problema
- Species: P. bulenta

Binomial name
- Problema bulenta (Boisduval & Le Conte, 1834)

= Problema bulenta =

Species of butterfly

Problema bulenta, the rare skipper, is a butterfly of the family Hesperiidae. It is hard to find within the United States. The species was first described based on a drawing.

== Appearance ==
The wingspan is 3.9–5.4 mm (0.15–0.21 in).

== Behavior ==
Adults feed on the nectar of the flowers of Pontederia cordata and Asclepias incarnata. Larvae feed on tall cordgrass and giant cutgrass. Its habitat is on "brackish river marshes" and rice paddies that are no longer in use. In the northern part of its range, the females give birth to one set of eggs in June. In the southern range, the females have two sets of eggs, "one in May to June and one in late July to September". While little is known about how the larvae develop, they more than likely overwinter during the middle of their instar stage and develop more as the temperature becomes higher.

== Habitat and discovery ==
Isolated populations of the species can be found by the East Coast of the United States, "from southern New Jersey and south to Georgia". The species was first described based on a drawing of a specimen that John Abbot drew in Georgia. A specimen was never collected again until sometime in the 1920s by Wilmington, North Carolina. It was then seen again in 1973 in Virginia and in Maryland in 1984. In 1993, it was reported as rarely being seen in a large group and was a candidate for being listed as either threatened or endangered. In Delaware, spray used to kill mosquitos have significantly impacted the species.

The butterfly is known to only live on a marsh alongside the Chickahominy River in Virginia and its habitat has been threatened by housing and recreational development. A 1984 book states that it is only known to live by the Chickahominy River in Virginia, the Wicomico River in Maryland, the Cape Fear River in North Carolina, the Santee River in South Carolina, and the Savannah River in Georgia. However, its range began to include New Jersey during the 1980s and also includes Delaware.

A 1993 issue of the Journal of the Lepidopterists' Society reported on more specimens being collected around New Jersey. A larva and a raised male were placed in the Yale University Peabody Museum of Natural History. Multiple specimens were given to Yale and the Cornell University Entomology Collection. The rest of the specimens were given to Stockton State College and the collection of researcher Dale F. Schweitzer.
