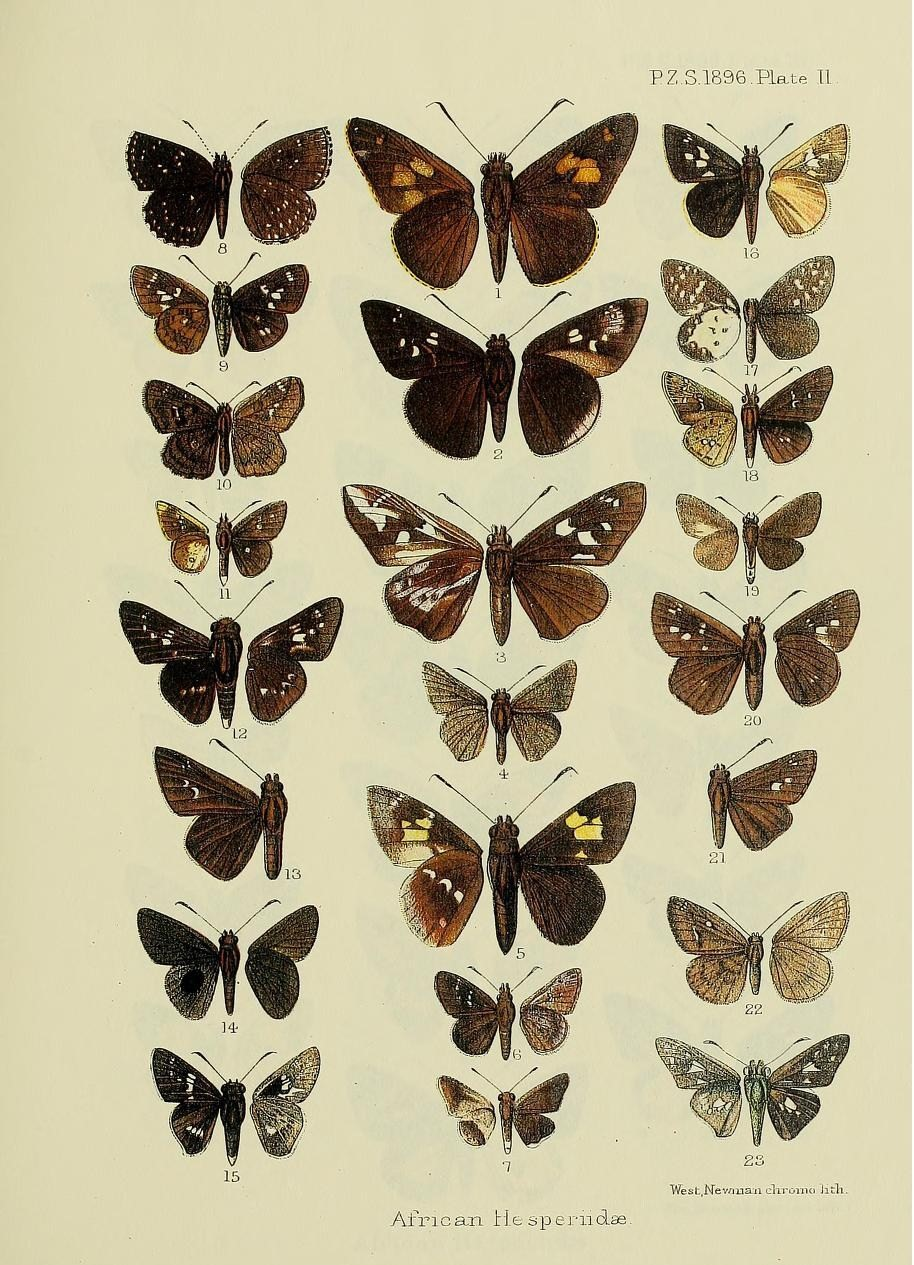
- Figure 19

Scientific classification
- Kingdom: Animalia
- Phylum: Arthropoda
- Clade: Pancrustacea
- Class: Insecta
- Order: Lepidoptera
- Family: Hesperiidae
- Genus: Paracleros
- Species: P. placidus

Binomial name
- Paracleros placidus (Plötz, 1879)

Synonyms
- Apaustus placidus Plötz, 1879

= Paracleros placidus =

Species of insect (butterfly)

Paracleros placidus, the western dusky dart, is a butterfly in the family Hesperiidae. It is found in Ivory Coast and Ghana. The habitat consists of grassy, shady areas in forests.

Torben Larsen developed a species numbering system for his 2005 publication Butterflies of West Africa. This species is #1337. The 'Larsen' numbers have since been used with permission in A Sharp Eye on Butterflies of Ghana.
