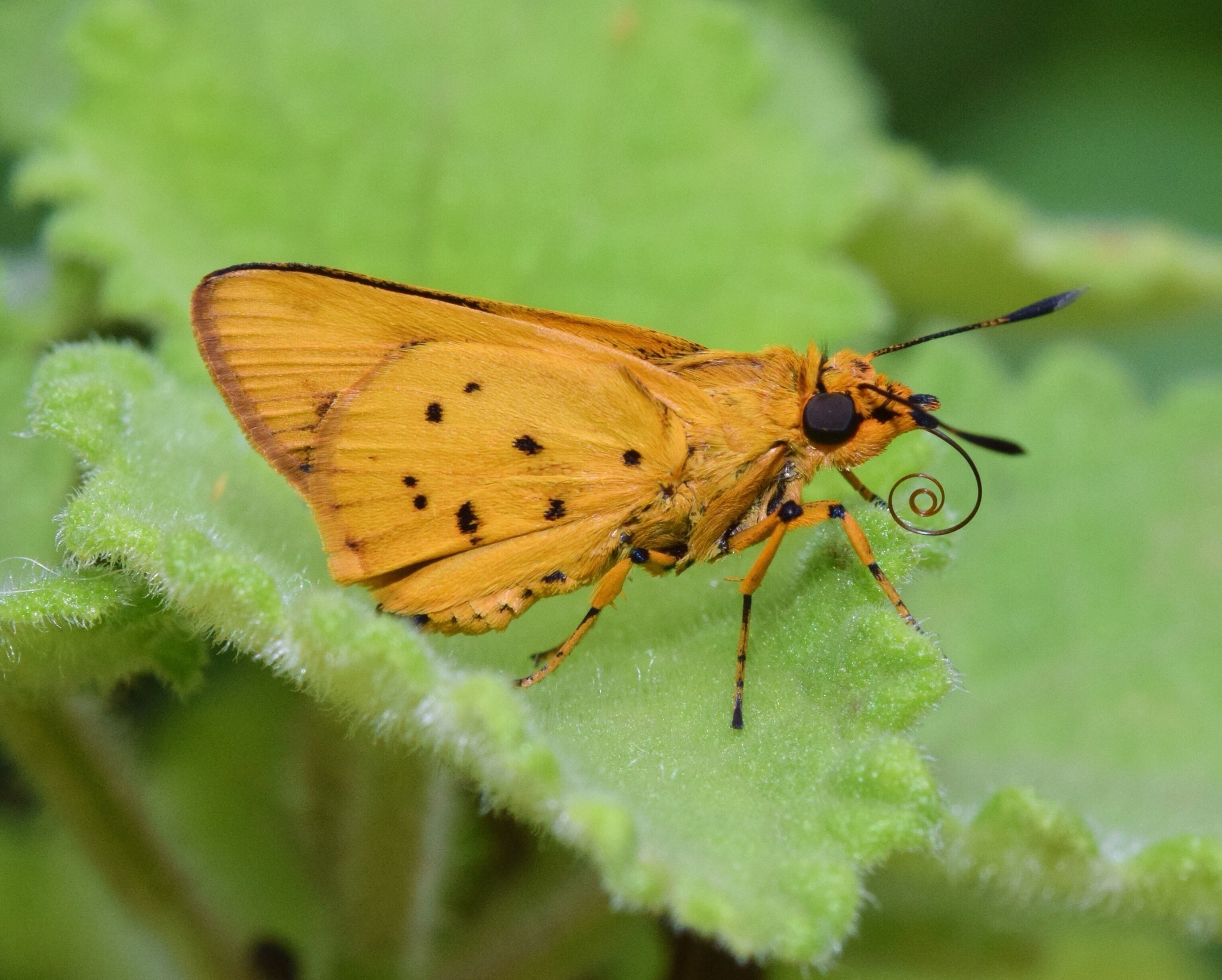

Scientific classification
- Kingdom: Animalia
- Phylum: Arthropoda
- Clade: Pancrustacea
- Class: Insecta
- Order: Lepidoptera
- Family: Hesperiidae
- Genus: Parosmodes
- Species: P. morantii

Binomial name
- Parosmodes morantii (Trimen, 1873)

Synonyms
- Pamphila morantii Trimen, 1873; Pamphila ranoha Westwood, 1881; Pamphila icteritia Mabille, 1891

= Parosmodes morantii =

Morant's orange

Species of butterfly

Parosmodes morantii, the Morant's skipper or Morant's orange, is a butterfly of the family Hesperiidae. It is found in KwaZulu-Natal, Eswatini, Mozambique, Botswana, Zimbabwe and from western Kenya to Ghana.

The wingspan is 28–31 mm for males and 33–35 mm for females. Adults are on wing from July to early October and from December to May in a stronger summer brood (with a peak from February to March). There are two generations per year.

The larvae feed on Combretum species (including Combretum queinzii and Combretum molle), Bridelia species (including Bridelia micrantha), Quisqualis, Terminalia and Syzygium cordatum.

== Subspecies ==
- Parosmodes morantii morantii — coast of Kenya, Tanzania, Democratic Republic of the Congo: Shaba, Angola, Malawi, Zambia, Mozambique, Zimbabwe, Botswana, Eswatini, South Africa: Limpopo Province, Mpumalanga, Gauteng, KwaZulu-Natal
- Parosmodes morantii axis Evans, 1937 — Senegal, Gambia, Guinea, northern Ivory Coast, Ghana, Nigeria, Uganda, western Kenya, western Tanzania

Torben Larsen developed a species numbering system for his 2005 publication Butterflies of West Africa. The subspecies axis is #1320. The 'Larsen' numbers have since been used with permission in A Sharp Eye on Butterflies of Ghana.
