= Paracleros sangoanus =

Scientific classification
- Domain: Eukaryota
- Kingdom: Animalia
- Phylum: Arthropoda
- Class: Insecta
- Order: Lepidoptera
- Family: Hesperiidae
- Genus: Paracleros
- Species: P. sangoanus

Binomial name
- Paracleros sangoanus (Carcasson, 1964)

Synonyms
- Acleros sangoanus Carcasson, 1964

Species of butterfly

Paracleros sangoanus is a butterfly in the family Hesperiidae. It is found in Uganda and north-western Tanzania. Its habitat consists of forests. It was described by English entomologist Robert Herbert Carcassonin, who specialised in butterflies.
