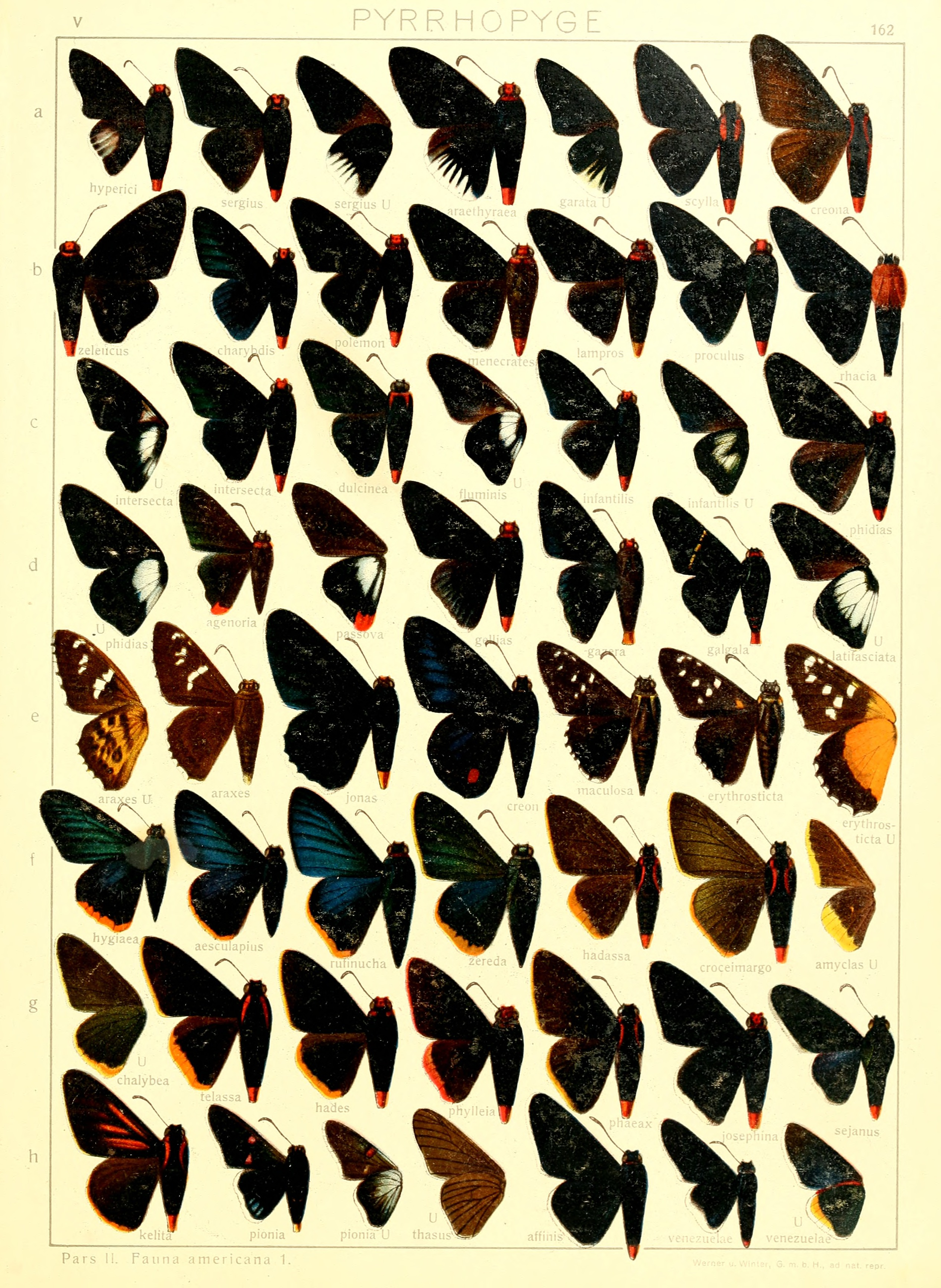
- P. passova and P. gellias in Adalbert Seitz's Macrolepidoptera of the World

Scientific classification
- Kingdom: Animalia
- Phylum: Arthropoda
- Class: Insecta
- Order: Lepidoptera
- Family: Hesperiidae
- Genus: Passova; Evans, 1951

= Passova =

Genus of butterflies

Passova is a Neotropical genus of firetips in the family Hesperiidae.

== Species ==
- Passova ganymedes (Bell, 1931) Colombia, Ecuador, Peru
- Passova gazera (Hewitson, [1866]) Brazil
- Passova gellias (Godman & Salvin, [1893]) Costa Rica, Honduras, Panama
- Passova glacia Evans, 1951 French Guiana
- Passova greta Evans, 1951 Bolivia, Peru
- Passova nigrocephala (Bell, 1934) Colombia
- Passova passova (Hewitson, [1866]) Colombia, Peru, Brazil, Guyana, French Guiana
- Passova passova passova (Hewitson, [1866]) Brazil, Amazonas; "Ega"
- Passova polemon (Hopffer, 1874) Brazil
- Passova vilna Evans, 1951 Bolivia
