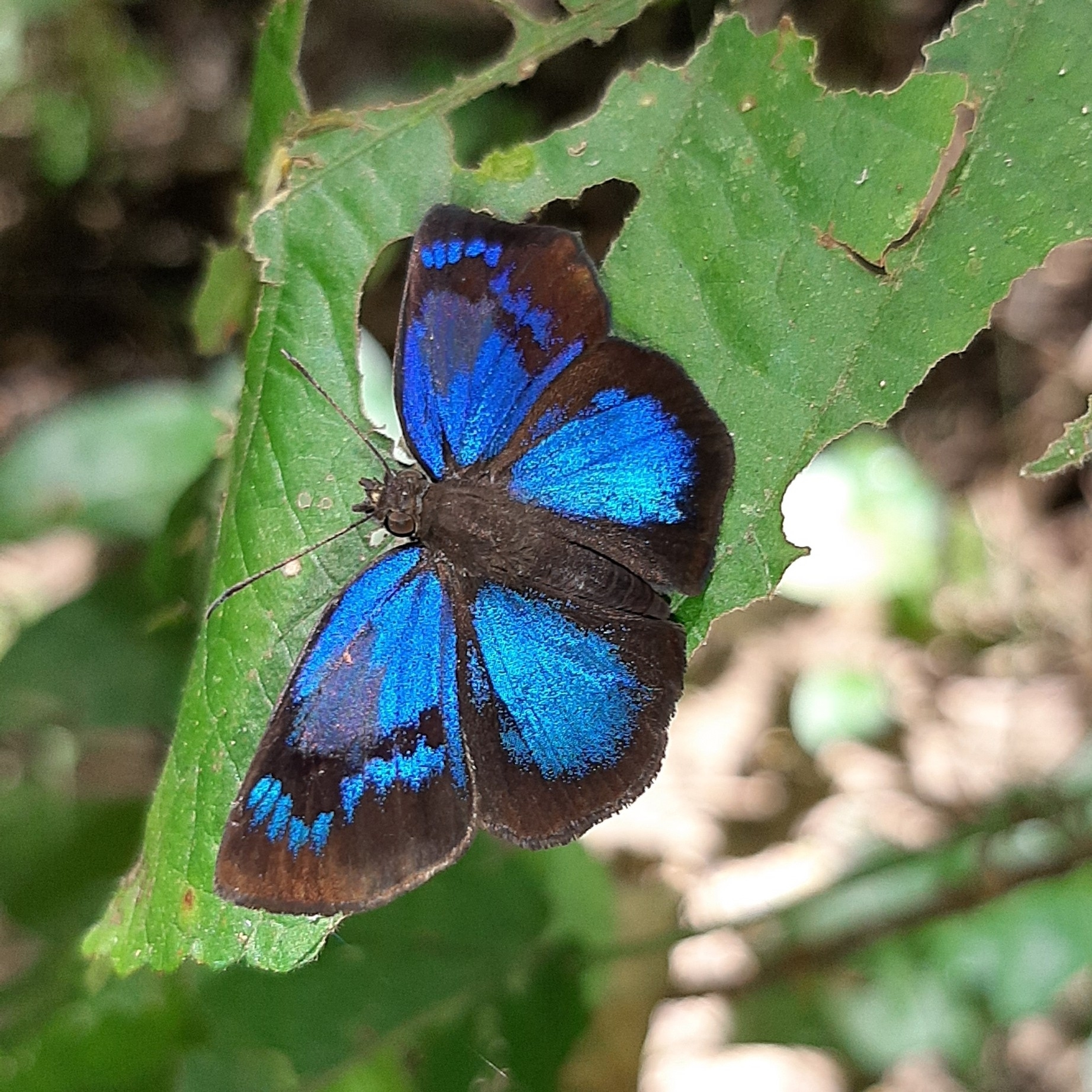
- Image of Paches loxus

Scientific classification
- Kingdom: Animalia
- Phylum: Arthropoda
- Clade: Pancrustacea
- Class: Insecta
- Order: Lepidoptera
- Family: Hesperiidae
- Subfamily: Pyrginae
- Genus: Paches; Godman & Salvin, 1895

= Paches =

Genus of butterflies

Paches is a genus of skippers in the family Hesperiidae.

== Species ==
Recognised species in the genus Paches include:

- Paches exosa Butler, 1877
- Paches gladiatus Butler, 1870
- Paches liborius Plötz, 1884
- Paches loxus Westwood, 1852
- Paches mutilatus Hopffer, 1874
- Paches polla Mabille, 1888
