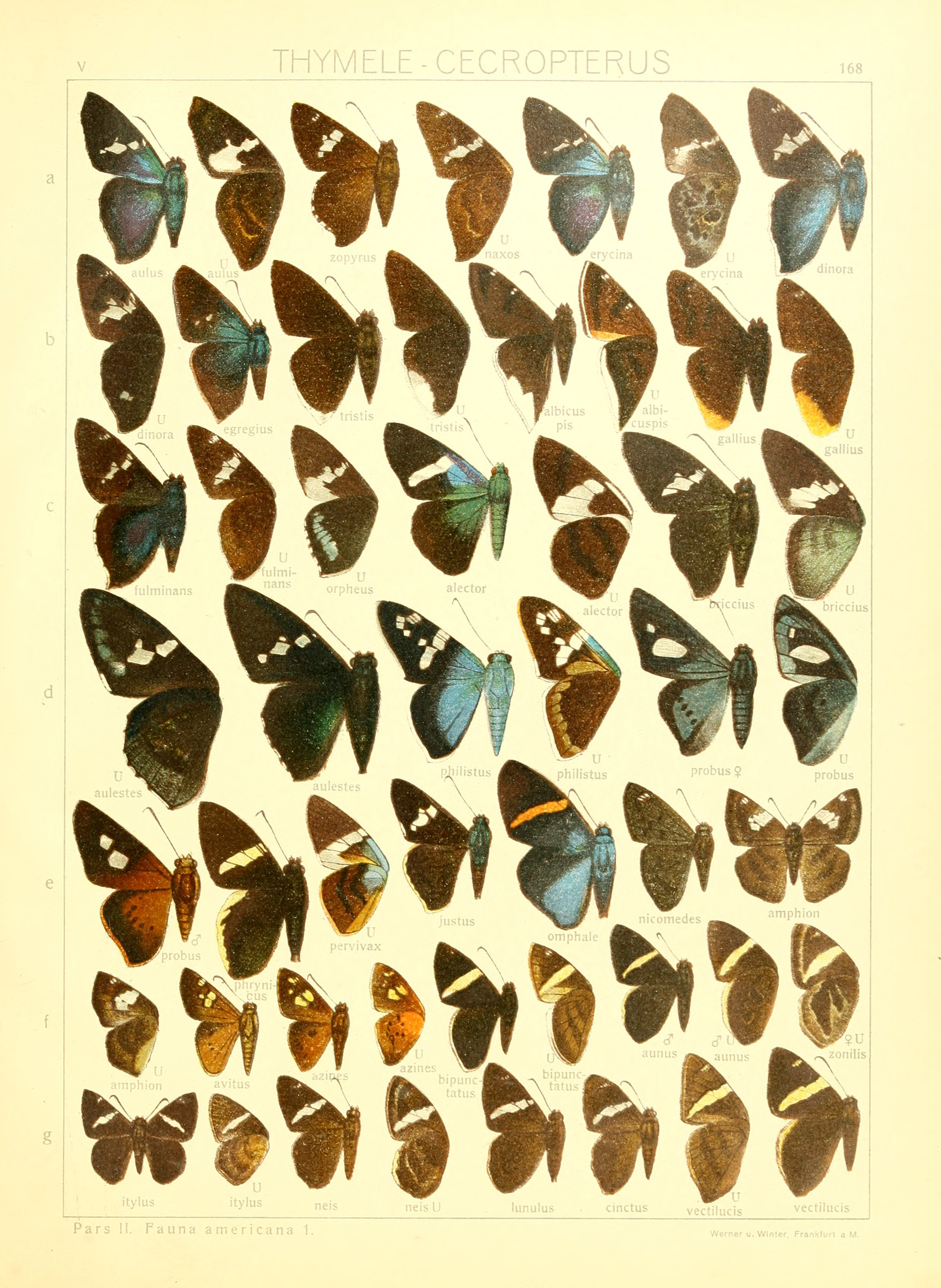
- Porphyrogenes spp. and related genera depicted in Adalbert Seitz's Macrolepidoptera of the World

Scientific classification
- Kingdom: Animalia
- Phylum: Arthropoda
- Class: Insecta
- Order: Lepidoptera
- Family: Hesperiidae
- Tribe: Phocidini
- Genus: Porphyrogenes; Watson, 1893

Synonyms
- Caecina Hewitson, 1868; Physalea Mabille, 1903; Ocyba Lindsey, 1925

= Porphyrogenes =

Genus of butterflies

Porphyrogenes is a Neotropical genus of spread-winged skippers in the family Hesperiidae, in which they are placed to tribe Phocidini.

== Species ==
- Porphyrogenes boliva Evans, 1952 - Venezuela
- Porphyrogenes calathana (Hewitson, 1868)
  - P. calathana calanus (Godman & Salvin, 1894)
  - P. calathana calathana (Hewitson, 1868)
  - P. calathana compusa (Hewitson, 1868)
- Porphyrogenes convexus Austin & O. Mielke, 2008
- Porphyrogenes despecta (Butler, 1870)
  - P. despecta despecta (Butler, 1870) - Brazil (Pará, Bahia)
  - P. despecta cervinus (Plötz, 1883) - Brazil
- Porphyrogenes eudemus (Mabille, 1888)
- Porphyrogenes ferruginea (Plötz, 1883)
- Porphyrogenes glavia Evans, 1952 - Panama
- Porphyrogenes passalus (Herrich-Schäffer, 1869) - Brazil (Amazonas) to Bolivia, Venezuela
- Porphyrogenes omphale (Butler, 1871) - Venezuela
- Porphyrogenes pausias (Hewitson, 1867) - Brazil (Amazonas)
- Porphyrogenes peterwegei Burns, 2010
- Porphyrogenes probus (Möschler, 1877) - Suriname, Colombia, Peru
- Porphyrogenes simulator Austin & O. Mielke, 2008
- Porphyrogenes sororcula (Mabille & Boullet, 1912) - French Guiana
- Porphyrogenes sparus Austin & O. Mielke, 2008
- Porphyrogenes spadix Austin & O. Mielke, 2008
- Porphyrogenes spanda Evans, 1952 - Brazil (Pará)
- Porphyrogenes sparta Evans, 1952 - Brazil (Pará)
- Porphyrogenes speciosus Austin & O. Mielke, 2008
- Porphyrogenes specularis Austin & O. Mielke, 2008
- Porphyrogenes spina Austin & O. Mielke, 2008
- Porphyrogenes splendidus Austin & O. Mielke, 2008
- Porphyrogenes spoda Evans, 1952 - Panama
- Porphyrogenes sporta Austin & O. Mielke, 2008
- Porphyrogenes stresa Evans, 1952 - Peru
- Porphyrogenes stupa Evans, 1952 - type locality unknown
- Porphyrogenes sula (R. Williams & E. Bell, 1940)
- Porphyrogenes virgatus (Mabille, 1888)
- Porphyrogenes vulpecula (Plötz, 1882)
  - P. vulpecula vulpecula (Plötz, 1882) - Brazil, Panama
  - P. vulpecula immaculata (Skinner, 1920) - Peru
- Porphyrogenes zohra (Möschler, 1879) - Venezuela, Peru, Honduras
