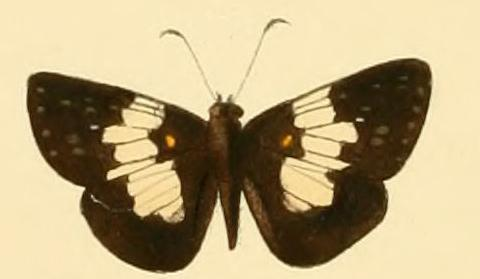

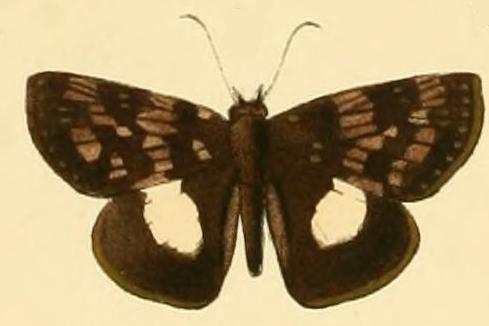

Scientific classification
- Kingdom: Animalia
- Phylum: Arthropoda
- Class: Insecta
- Order: Lepidoptera
- Family: Hesperiidae
- Genus: Potamanaxas
- Species: P. thestia

Binomial name
- Potamanaxas thestia (Hewitson, 1870)

Synonyms
- Leucochitonea thestia Hewitson, 1870; Potomanaxas thestia cranda Evans, 1953

= Potamanaxas thestia =

Species of butterfly

Potamanaxas thestia, the thestia skipper, is a butterfly in the family Hesperiidae. It is found in Costa Rica, Panama and Ecuador.

== Subspecies ==
- Potamanaxas thestia thestia (Ecuador)
- Potamanaxas thestia cranda Evans, 1953 (Costa Rica, Panama)
