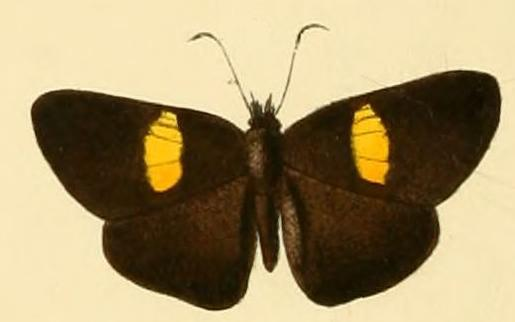

Scientific classification
- Kingdom: Animalia
- Phylum: Arthropoda
- Class: Insecta
- Order: Lepidoptera
- Family: Hesperiidae
- Genus: Potamanaxas
- Species: P. flavofasciata

Binomial name
- Potamanaxas flavofasciata (Hewitson, 1870)

Synonyms
- Leucochitonea flavofasciata Hewitson, 1870; Potomanaxas flavofasciata pantra Evans, 1953

= Potamanaxas flavofasciata =

Species of butterfly

Potamanaxas flavofasciata, the yellowbanded skipper, is a butterfly in the family Hesperiidae. It is found in Ecuador, Peru and Bolivia.

== Subspecies ==
- Potamanaxas flavofasciata flavofasciata (Ecuador, Peru)
- Potamanaxas flavofasciata pantra Evans, 1953 (Bolivia)

== Appearance ==
The upper wings are mostly dark brown, while a wide, golden-yellow band crosses the forewing. A small white patch may be seen near the forewing apex. Additionally, the fore and hind wings have a narrow border checkered with yellow and brown. The underwing is similar except it is somewhat paler due to the lack of sunlight received in the area. The hindwing beneath is a dark brown with multiple bands of darker brown. Only males have a white ring below the antennal clubs.

== Egg ==
Laid by females, eggs are usually found as a short string of 2-7 red-colored eggs. They are stacked at angles instead to of being centered on each other.

== Caterpillars ==
Caterpillars have small yellow dots and are colored yellow-green. It has a wide, yellow, lateral stripe. The head is reddish-brown with two false eyespots in the lower facial region.

== Chrysalis ==
The chrysalis is covered in a white, granular substance but is generally brown with a green hue.
