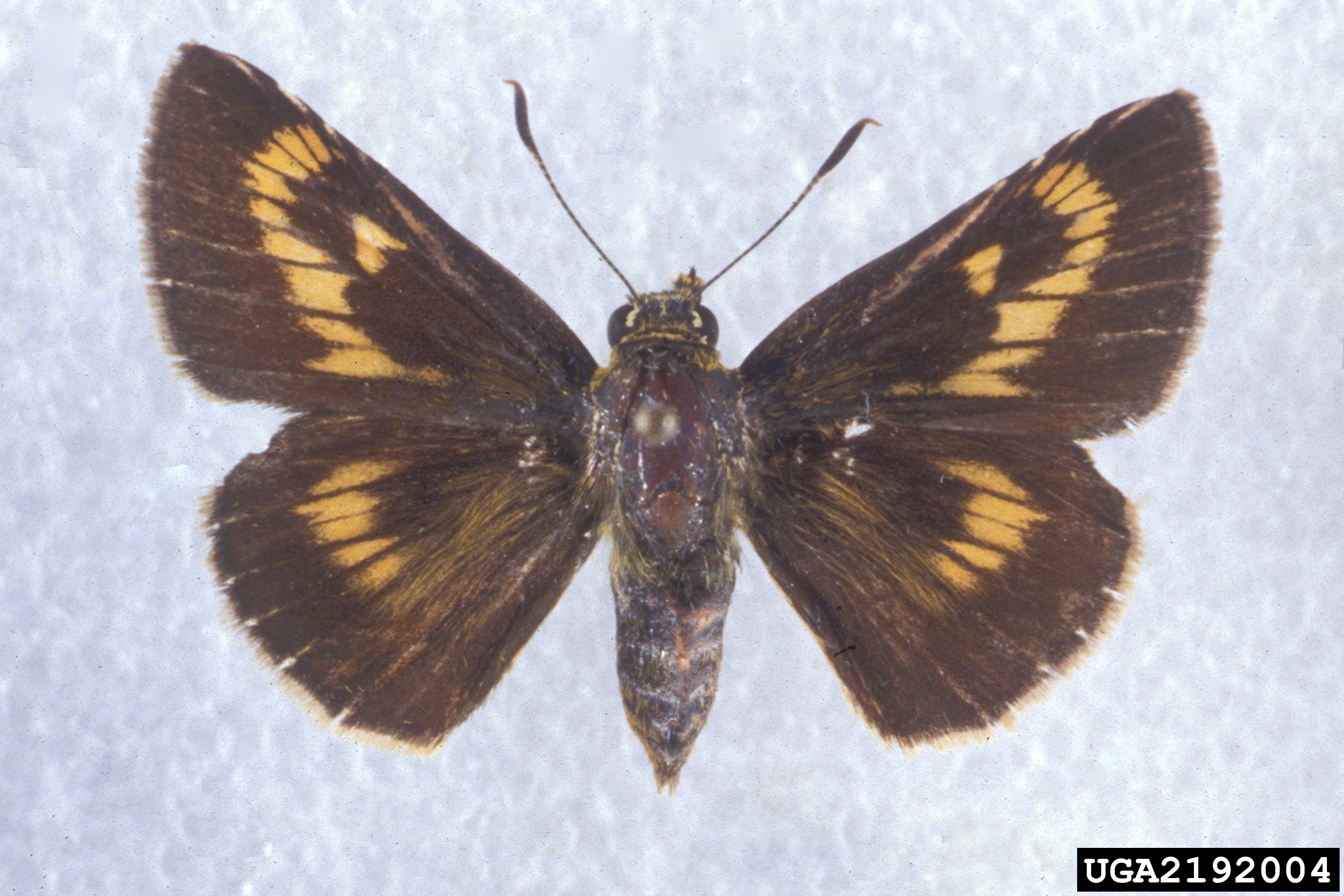
- Problema byssus

Scientific classification
- Kingdom: Animalia
- Phylum: Arthropoda
- Class: Insecta
- Order: Lepidoptera
- Family: Hesperiidae
- Tribe: Hesperiini
- Genus: Problema; Skinner & Williams, 1924

Type species
- Pamphila byssus Edwards, 1880

= Problema =

Genus of butterflies

Problema is a genus of skippers in the family Hesperiidae.

== Species ==
- Problema byssus (Edwards, 1880)
- Problema bulenta (Boisduval & LeConte, 1834)
