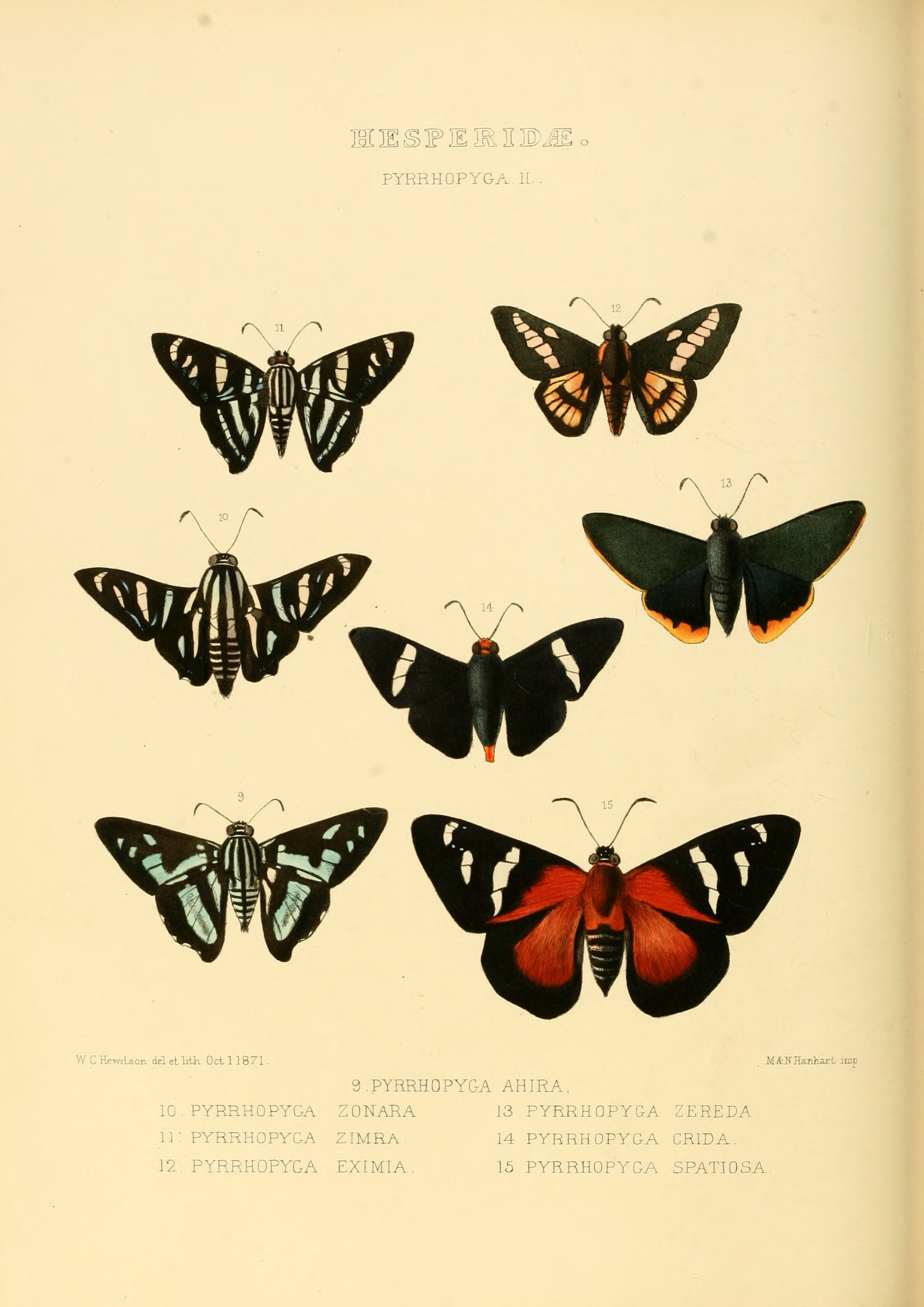
- Parelbella ahira figure 9

Scientific classification
- Kingdom: Animalia
- Phylum: Arthropoda
- Class: Insecta
- Order: Lepidoptera
- Family: Hesperiidae
- Genus: Parelbella; Mielke, 1995

= Parelbella =

Genus of butterflies

Parelbella is a Neotropical genus of firetips in the family Hesperiidae.

== Species ==
- Parelbella polyzona (Latreille, [1824]) polyzona skipper - southeast Brazil
- Parelbella ahira (Hewitson, 1866) Ahira skipper - type locality Brazil
  - Parelbella ahira ahira (Hewitson, 1866) French Guiana, Colombia, Peru, Bolivia, Paraguay, north and west Brazil
  - Parelbella ahira extrema (Röber, 1925) southeast Brazil, Paraguay
- Parelbella peruana O. Mielke, 1995 Peruana skipper - Peru
- Parelbella macleannani (Godman & Salvin, 1893) Macleannan's skipper - southeast Mexico to northwest Ecuador
- Parelbella nigra O. Mielke, Austin & A. Warren, 2008 Mielke's skipper southeast Mexico
