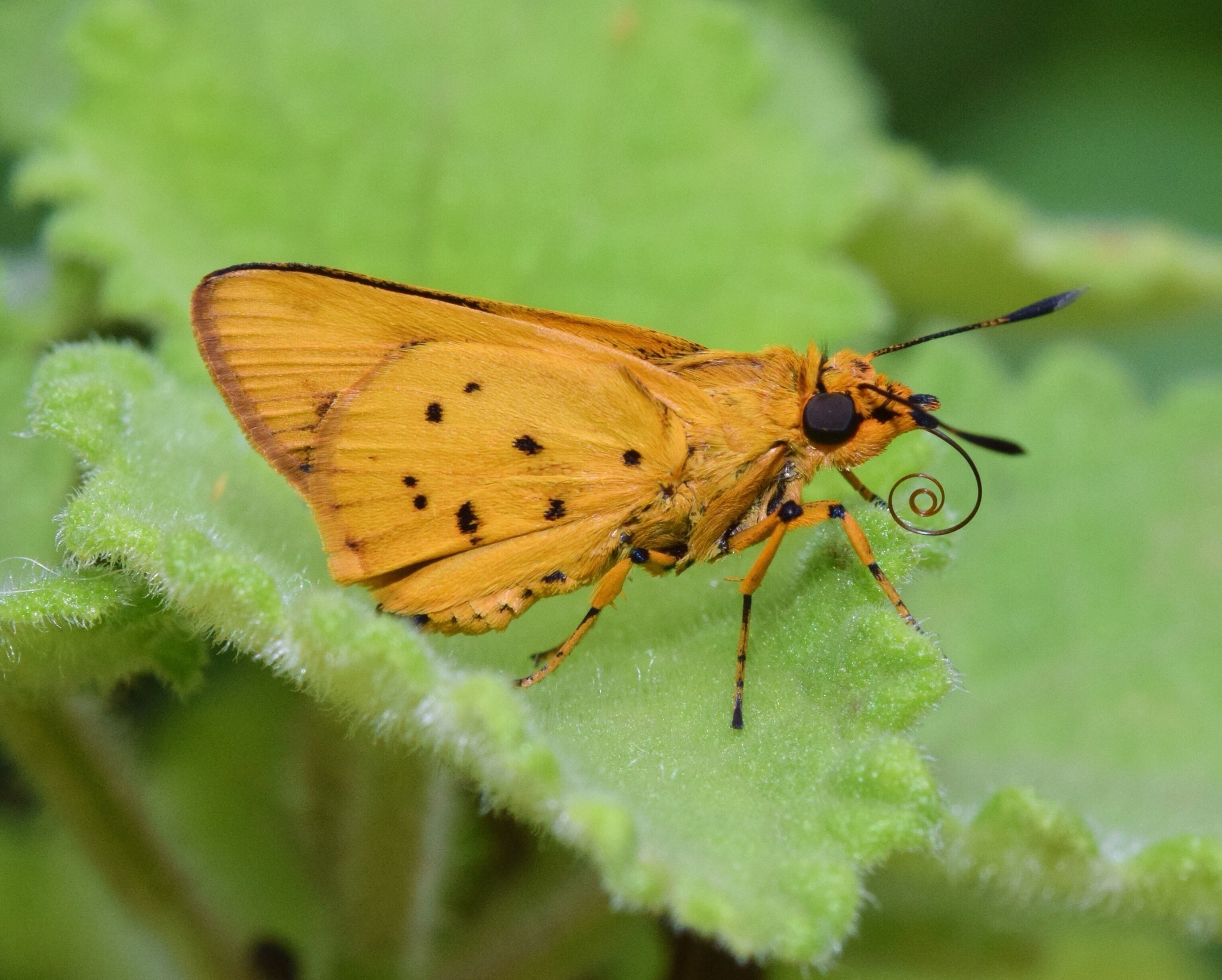
- P. morantii morantii

Scientific classification
- Kingdom: Animalia
- Phylum: Arthropoda
- Class: Insecta
- Order: Lepidoptera
- Family: Hesperiidae
- Tribe: Erionotini
- Genus: Parosmodes; Holland, 1896

= Parosmodes =

Genus of butterflies

Parosmodes is a genus of skippers in the family Hesperiidae.

== Species ==
- Parosmodes lentiginosa (Holland, 1896)
- Parosmodes morantii (Trimen, 1873)
- Parosmodes onza Evans, 1955
