= Procidosa =

Scientific classification
- Kingdom: Animalia
- Phylum: Arthropoda
- Class: Insecta
- Order: Lepidoptera
- Family: Hesperiidae
- Genus: Procidosa; Atkins, 1973

Genus of butterflies

Procidosa is a genus of skipper butterflies in the family Hesperiidae.
