= Psoralis =

Scientific classification
- Kingdom: Animalia
- Phylum: Arthropoda
- Class: Insecta
- Order: Lepidoptera
- Family: Hesperiidae
- Subtribe: Moncina
- Genus: Psoralis; Mabille, 1904

Synonyms
- Pamba Evans, 1955

Genus of butterflies

Psoralis is a genus of skippers in the family Hesperiidae.

== Species ==
Recognised species in the genus Psoralis include:

- Psoralis arva (Evans, 1955)
- Psoralis calcarea (Schaus, 1902)
- Psoralis idee Weeks, 1901
- Psoralis laska (Evans, 1955)
- Psoralis pamba (Evans, [1955])
- Psoralis sabina Freeman, 1969
- Psoralis stacara Schaus, 1902
- Psoralis umbrata (Erschoff, 1876)
- Psoralis visendus (E. Bell, 1942)

=== Former species ===
- Psoralis alis Bell, 1959 - synonymized with Chitta chittara (Schaus, 1902)
- Psoralis concolor Nicolay, 1980 - transferred to Ralis concolor (Nicolay, 1980)
- Psoralis darienensis Gaviria, Siewert, Mielke and Casagrande, 2018 - transferred to Alychna darienensis (Gaviria, Siewert, Mielke and Casagrande, 2018)
- Psoralis mirnae Siewert, Nakamura and Mielke, 2014 - transferred to Alychna mirnae (Siewert, Nakamura and Mielke, 2014)
- Psoralis sabaeus Mabille, 1904 - synonymized with Pamphila idee Weeks, 1901
- Psoralis venta Evans, 1955 - transferred to Alychna venta (Evans, 1955)
