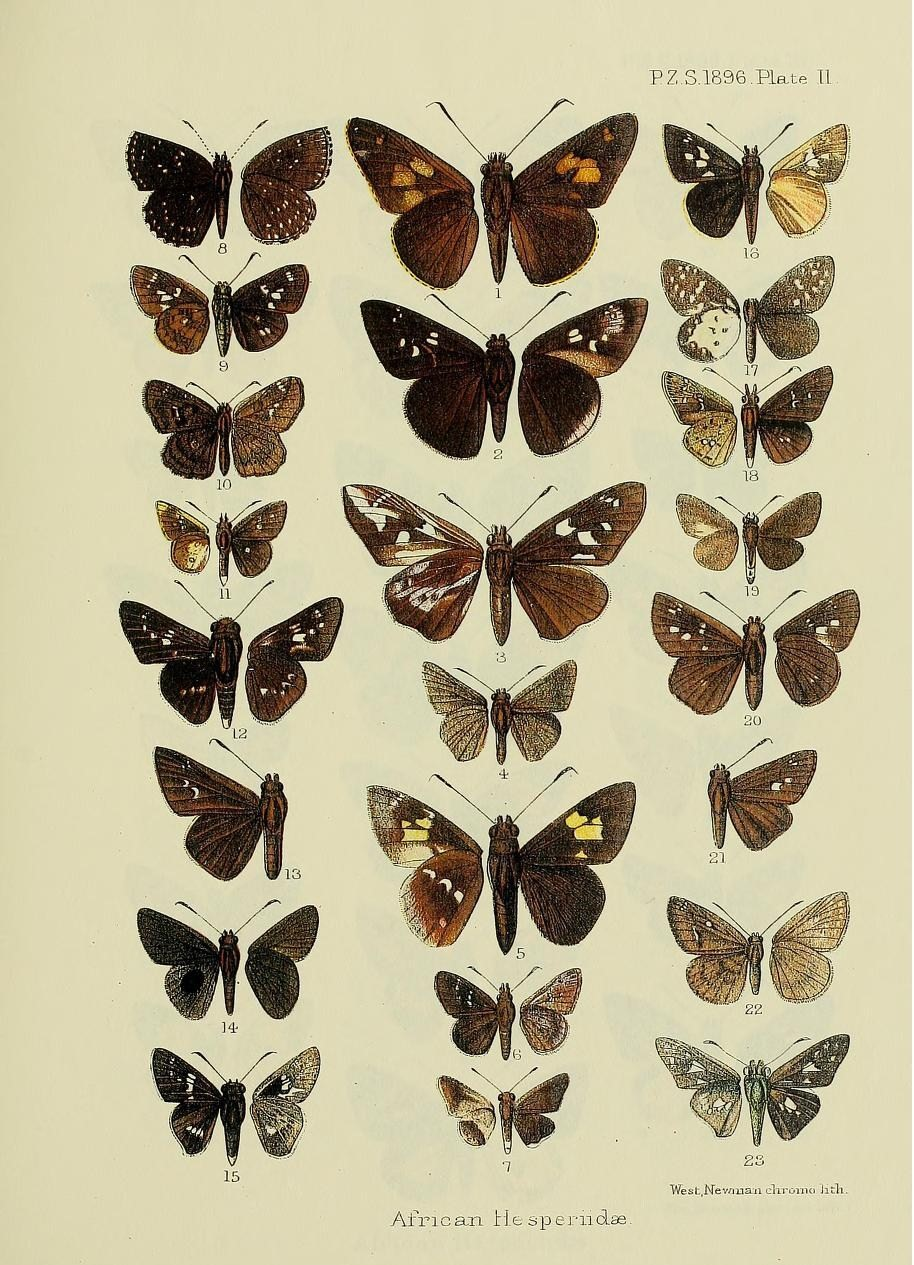
- Paracleros placidus figure 19

Scientific classification
- Kingdom: Animalia
- Phylum: Arthropoda
- Class: Insecta
- Order: Lepidoptera
- Family: Hesperiidae
- Tribe: Erionotini
- Genus: Paracleros; Berger, 1978

= Paracleros =

Genus of butterflies

Paracleros is a genus of skippers in the family Hesperiidae. They are generally found in the continent of Africa.

== Species ==
- Paracleros biguttulus (Mabille, 1889)
- Paracleros maesseni Berger, 1978
- Paracleros placidus (Plötz, 1879)
- Paracleros sangoanus (Carcasson, 1964)
- Paracleros staudei Collins & Larsen, 2000
- Paracleros substrigata (Holland, 1893)
