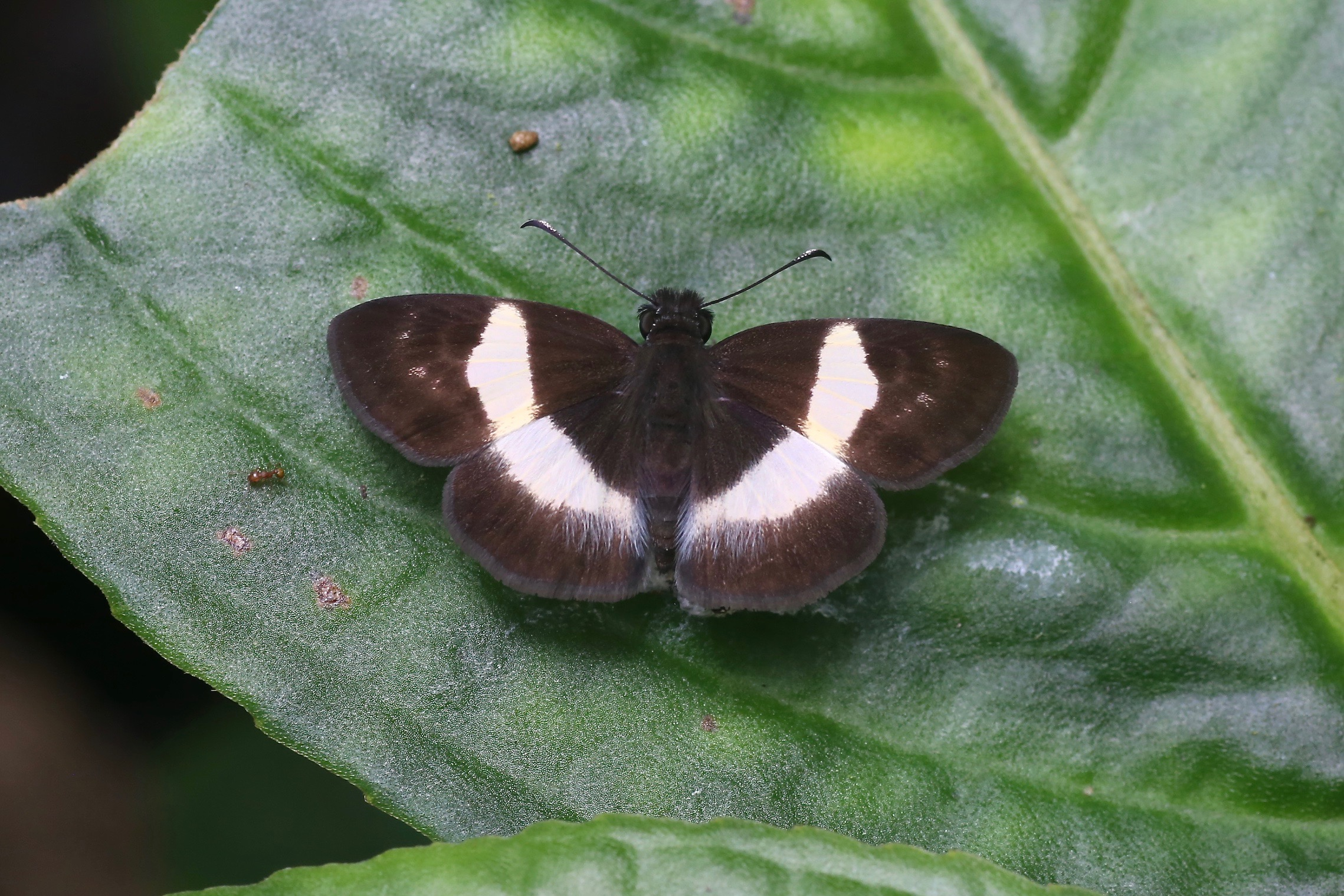
- Potamanaxas thoria. Río Alpayacu, Mera, Ecuador.

Scientific classification
- Kingdom: Animalia
- Phylum: Arthropoda
- Class: Insecta
- Order: Lepidoptera
- Family: Hesperiidae
- Subfamily: Pyrginae
- Tribe: Erynnini
- Genus: Potamanaxas; Lindsey, 1925

Synonyms
- Potamanax Watson, 1893

= Potamanaxas =

Genus of butterflies

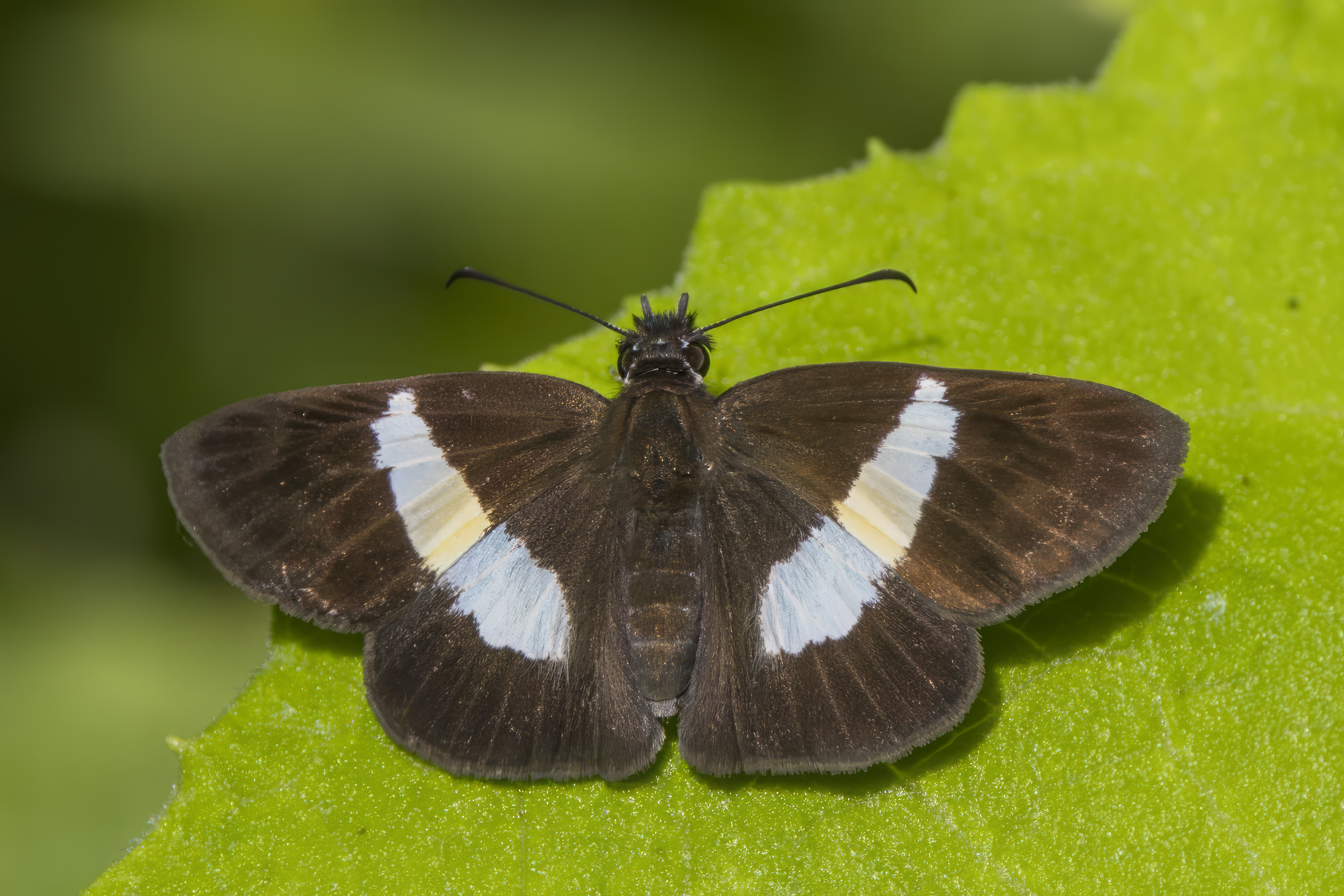
Crisppatch skipper P. tschotky, Colombia

Potamanaxas is a genus of skipper butterflies in the family Hesperiidae.

== Species ==
- Potamanaxas andraemon (Mabille, 1898)
- Potamanaxas bana Bell, 1956
- Potamanaxas effusa (Draudt, 1922)
- Potamanaxas flavofasciata (Hewitson, 1870)
- Potamanaxas frenda Evans, 1953
- Potamanaxas hirta (Weeks, 1901)
- Potamanaxas laoma (Hewitson, 1870)
- Potamanaxas latrea (Hewitson, 1875)
- Potamanaxas melicertes (Godman & Salvin, [1895])
- Potamanaxas paralus (Godman & Salvin, [1895])
- Potamanaxas quira Bell, 1956
- Potamanaxas thestia (Hewitson, 1870)
- Potamanaxas thoria (Hewitson, 1870)
- Potamanaxas tunga Bell, 1956
- Potamanaxas unifasciata (C. & R. Felder, 1867)
- Potamanaxas xantholeuce (Mabille, 1888)
