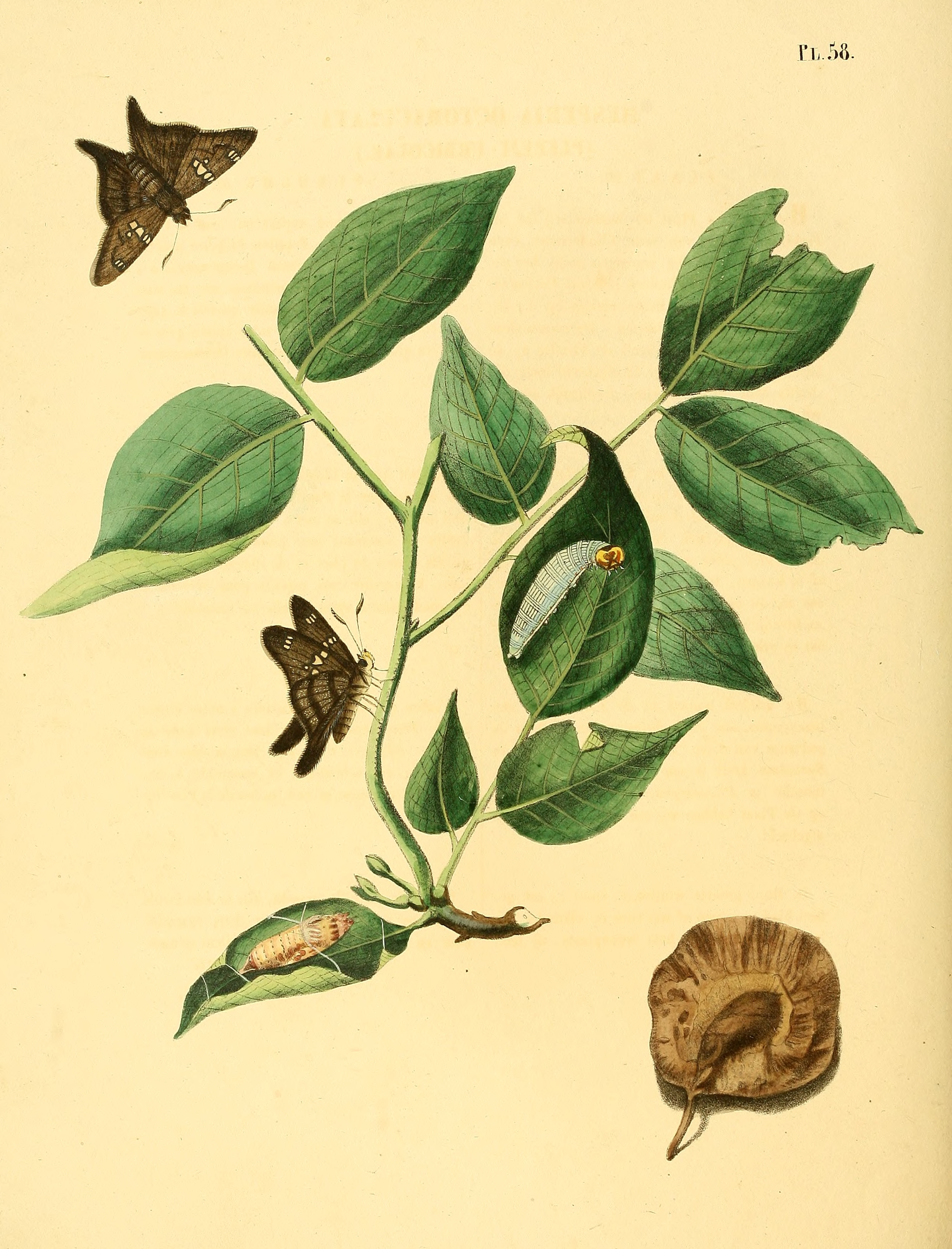
- Ectomis octomaculata depicted in Sepp's Surinaamsche vlinders : naar het leven geteekend [1844]

Scientific classification
- Kingdom: Animalia
- Phylum: Arthropoda
- Class: Insecta
- Order: Lepidoptera
- Family: Hesperiidae
- Subtribe: Telemiadina
- Genus: Ectomis; Mabille, 1878

Synonyms
- Polythrix Watson, 1893

= Ectomis =

Genus of butterflies

Ectomis is a genus of Neotropical and Nearctic butterflies in the family Hesperiidae (Eudaminae).

== Species ==
The following species are recognised in the genus Ectomis:

- Ectomis (Asina)
  - Ectomis gyges Evans, 1952 - Venezuela, Peru
  - Ectomis hirtius (Butler, 1870) - Venezuela
  - Ectomis roma Evans, 1952 - Brazil (Pará, Amazonas), Peru
  - Ectomis asine (Hewitson, 1867) - Mexico through Central America to Peru
  - Ectomis mexicanus Freeman, 1969 - Mexico, Texas
- Ectomis (Ectomis)
  - Ectomis octomaculata (Sepp, [1844]) - Mexico, Guatemala to Brazil, Suriname, Colombia, Argentina
  - Ectomis maizae (Hellebuyck, 1998) - Nicaragua
  - Ectomis auginus (Hewitson, 1867) - Mexico, Guyana, French Guiana, Colombia, Brazil (Amazonas)
  - Ectomis ceculus (Herrich-Schäffer, 1869) - Brazil (Rio de Janeiro)
  - Ectomis caunus (Herrich-Schäffer, 1869) - Mexico, Paraguay
  - Ectomis metallescens (Mabille, 1888) - Brazil (Amazonas, Pará)
  - Ectomis kanshul (Shuey, 1991) - Mexico, Panama
  - Ectomis eudoxus (Stoll, 1781) - Suriname
  - Ectomis minvanes (Williams, 1926) - Brazil (Mato Grosso)
  - Ectomis labriaris (Butler, 1877) - Brazil (Amazonas, Bahia)
  - Ectomis cythna (Hewitson, 1878)
  - Ectomis speculum (Austin, 2008)
  - Ectomis teutas (Hewitson, 1876)
  - Ectomis pervivax (Hübner, [1819])
  - Ectomis bahiana (Herrich-Schäffer, 1869) - Brazil (Bahia, Pará), Peru, Venezuela
  - Ectomis orphne (Plötz, 1881) - Brazil (Rio de Janeiro)
  - Ectomis otriades (Hewitson, 1867) - Brazil (Amazonas)
  - Ectomis epicincea (Butler & Druce, 1872) - Mexico, Costa Rica
  - Ectomis perniciosus (Herrich-Schäffer, 1869) - Colombia, Brazil
  - Ectomis cuminaensis (d'Almeida, 1976) - Brazil (Pará)
  - Ectomis orpheus (Plötz, 1881) - Brazil (Pará)
  - Ectomis perna (Evans, 1952) - Colombia
  - Ectomis albovenae (Bell, 1932) - Santa Catarina, Brazil
