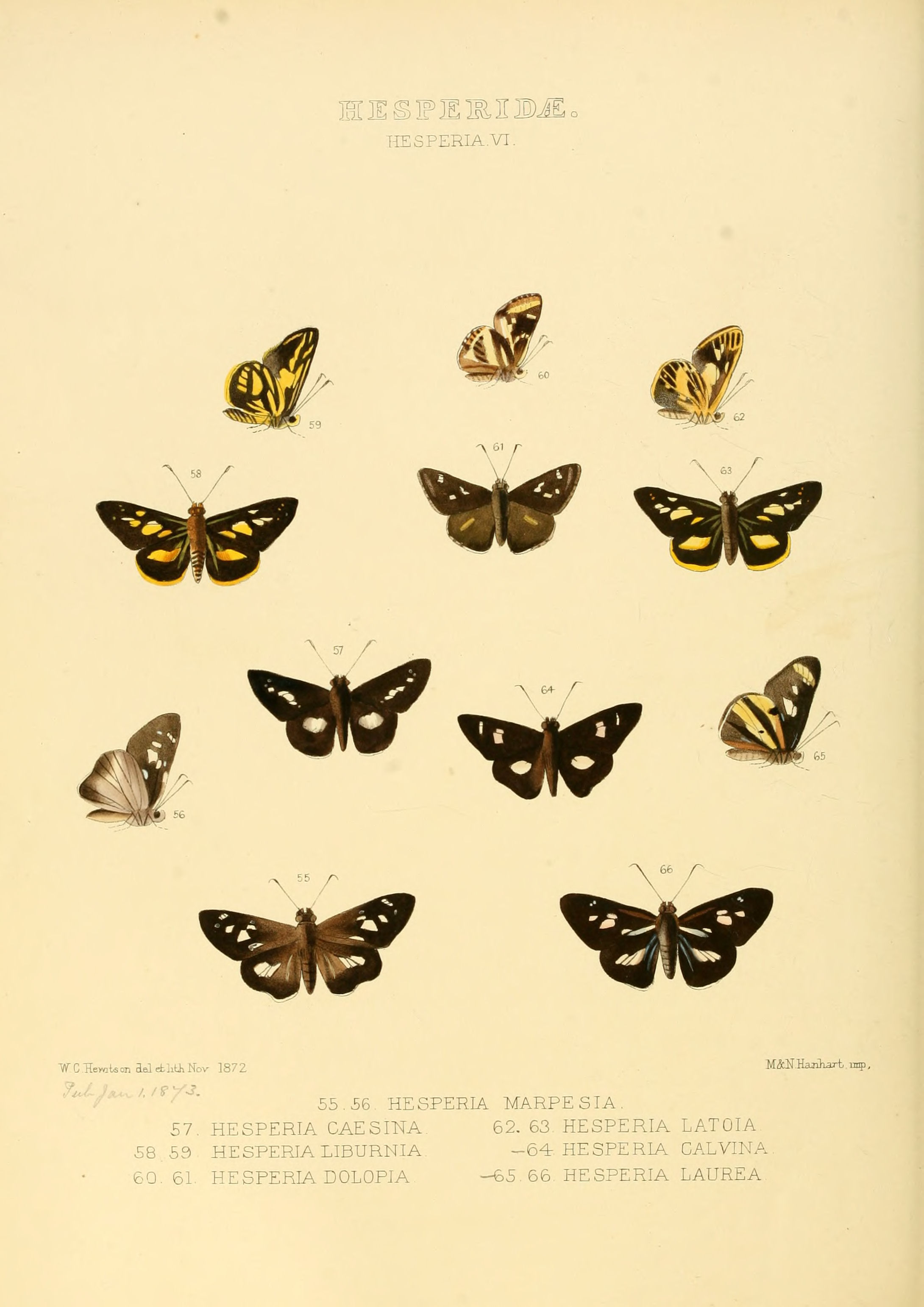
- Figs. 60, 61. Sebastonyma dolopia (Hewitson, 1868)

Scientific classification
- Kingdom: Animalia
- Phylum: Arthropoda
- Class: Insecta
- Order: Lepidoptera
- Family: Hesperiidae
- Tribe: Aeromachini
- Genus: Sebastonyma; Watson, 1893

Synonyms
- Parasovia Devyatkin, 1996

= Sebastonyma =

Genus of butterflies

Sebastonyma is a genus of grass skippers in the family Hesperiidae.

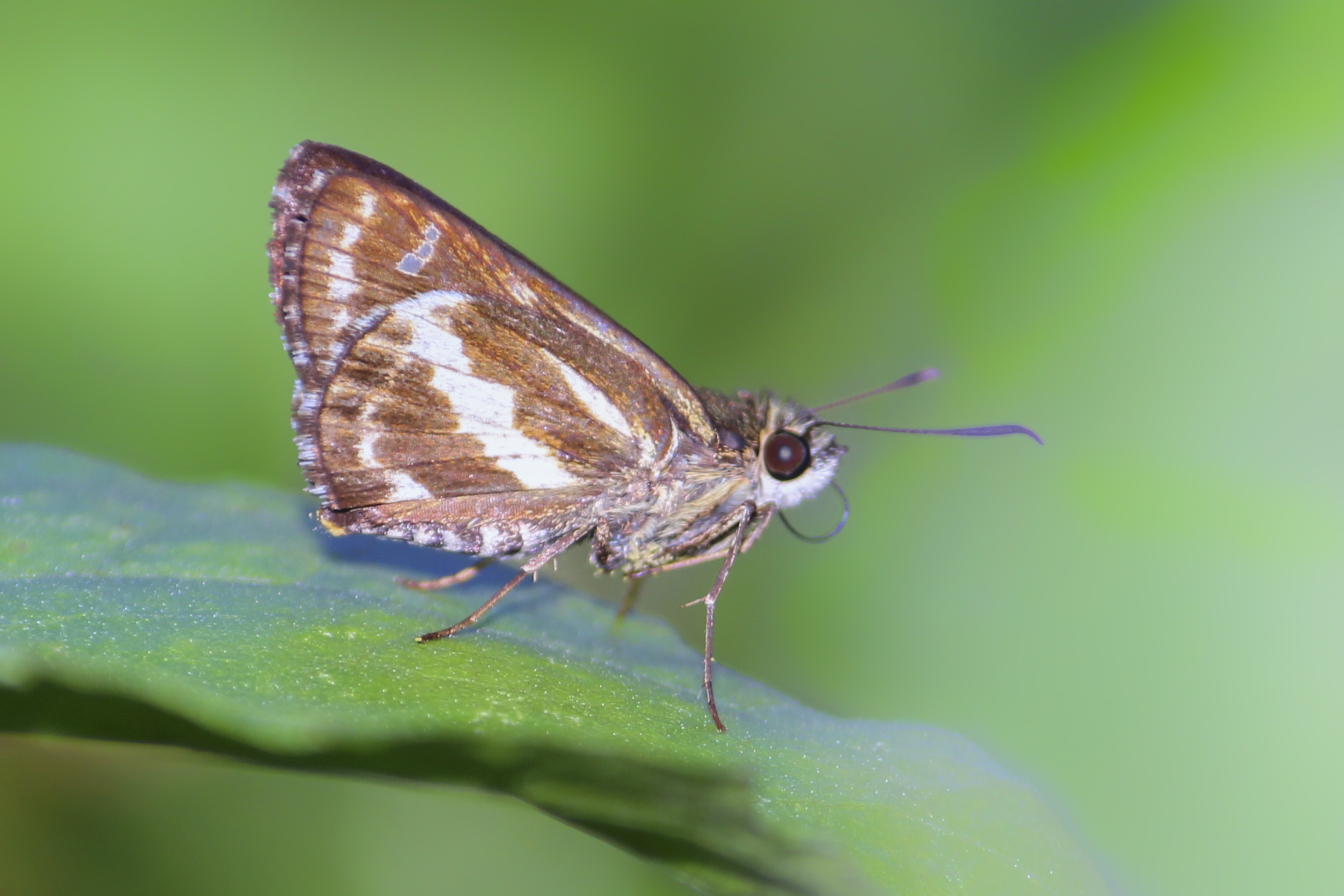
Sebastonyma dolopia

== Species ==
- Sebastonyma dolopia (Hewitson, 1868) - Himalayas, Sikkim to Burma, northern Thailand, Laos
- Sebastonyma perbella (Hering, 1918) - China
- Sebastonyma pudens Evans, 1937 - Burma, northern Thailand
- Sebastonyma suthepiana Murayama & Kimura, 1990 - northern Thailand, Laos
- Sebastonyma medoensis Lee, 1979 - China
  - S. m. medoensis Tibet
  - S. m. albostriata Huang, 2003 Yunnan
