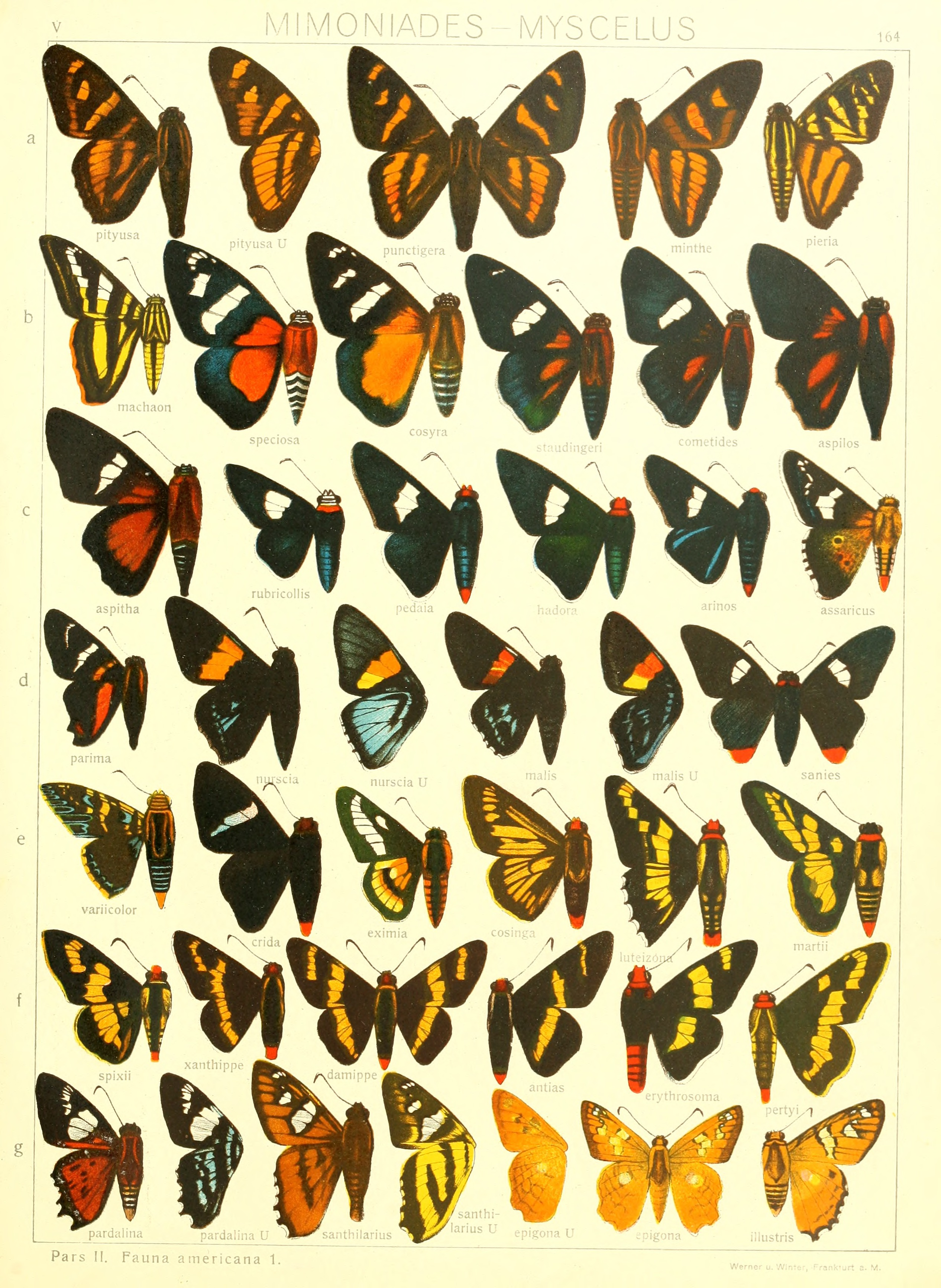
- Pseudocroniades and related genera in Adalbert Seitz's Macrolepidoptera of the World

Scientific classification
- Kingdom: Animalia
- Phylum: Arthropoda
- Class: Insecta
- Order: Lepidoptera
- Family: Hesperiidae
- Genus: Pseudocroniades; Mielke, 1995
- Species: P. machaon

Binomial name
- Pseudocroniades machaon (Westwood, 1852)

= Pseudocroniades =

Genus of butterflies

Pseudocroniades is a Neotropical genus of firetips in the family Hesperiidae. The genus is monotypic. The single species Pseudocroniades machaon, the yellow-banded skipper, is found only in Brazil.
