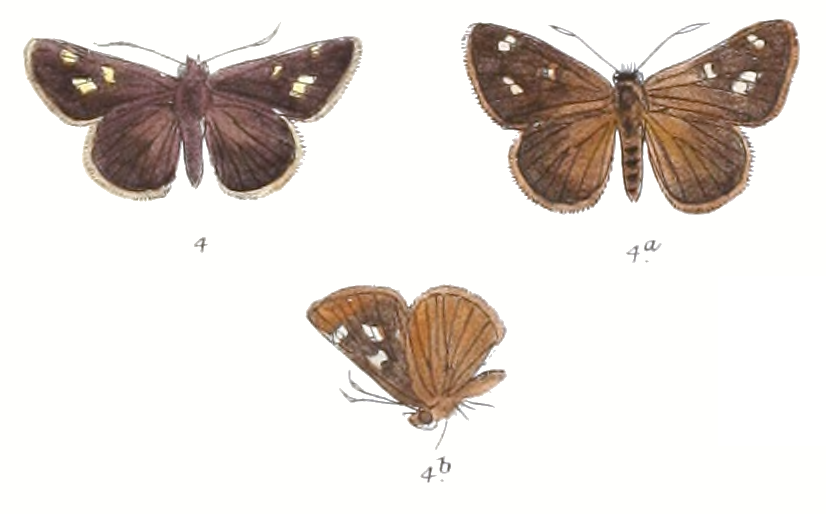
- Pedesta pandita

Scientific classification
- Kingdom: Animalia
- Phylum: Arthropoda
- Class: Insecta
- Order: Lepidoptera
- Family: Hesperiidae
- Tribe: Aeromachini
- Genus: Pedesta; Hemming, 1934

= Pedesta =

Genus of butterflies

Pedesta is an Indomalayan genus of grass skippers, butterflies in the subfamily Hesperiinae (Hesperiidae).

== Species ==
- Pedesta baileyi – China (Northwest Yunnan, West Sichuan)
- Pedesta blanchardii – China (Shaanxi)
- Pedesta masuriensis – Himalayas to Assam, Laos, Vietnam, North Yunnan
- Pedesta nanka – China (Northwest Yunnan, West Sichuan)
- Pedesta panda – China
- Pedesta pandita – Sikkim to Burma, North Vietnam
- Pedesta pedla
- Pedesta rubella (Devyatkin, 1996) – Vietnam
- Pedesta serena – China (West Sichuan, Northwest Yunnan), Northeast Burma, North Vietnam
- Pedesta shensia – China (Shaanxi)
- Pedesta submacula – (Leech, 1890) – China, Vietnam
- Pedesta tali – China (North Yunnan)
- Pedesta naumanni – Tibet
