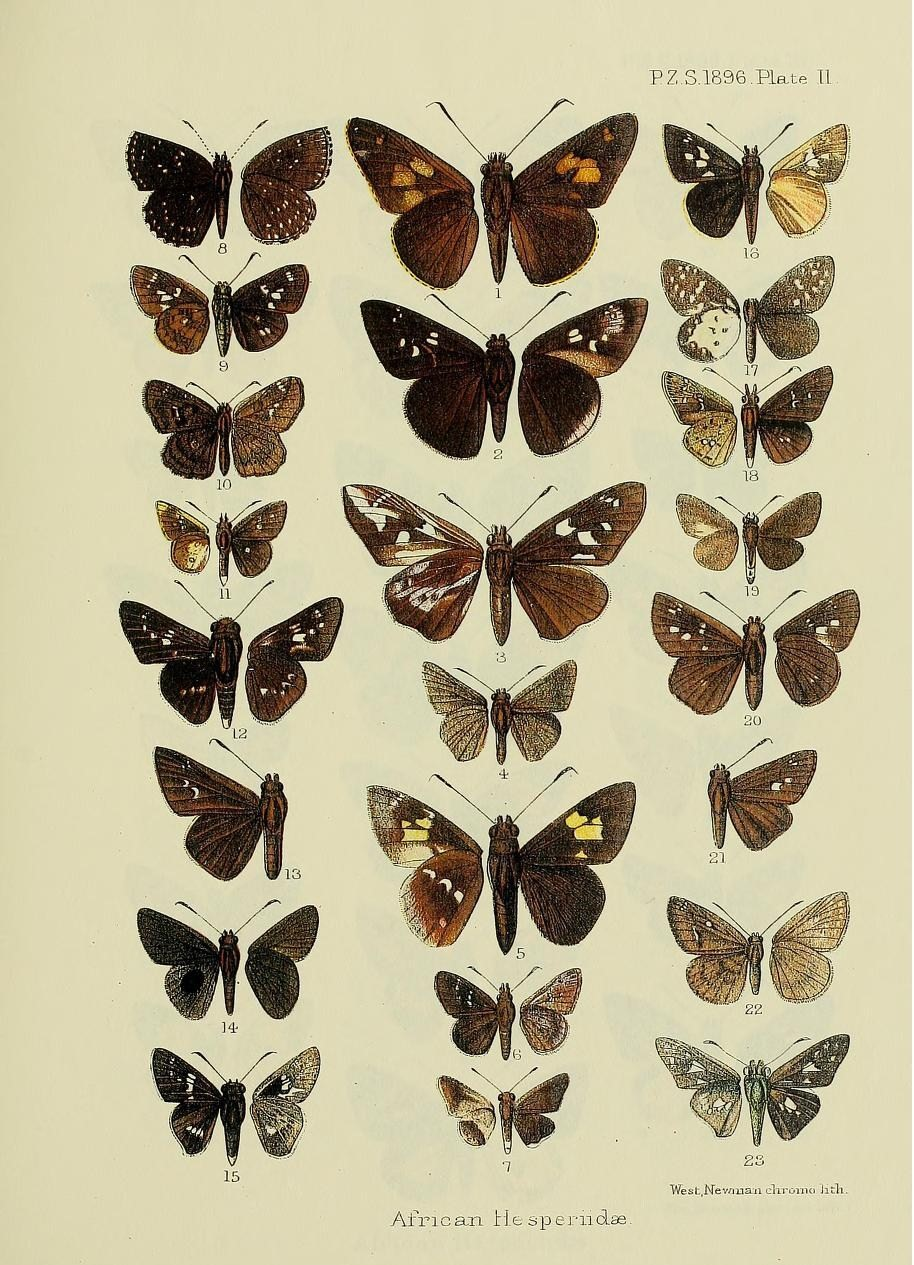

Scientific classification
- Kingdom: Animalia
- Phylum: Arthropoda
- Class: Insecta
- Order: Lepidoptera
- Family: Hesperiidae
- Subfamily: Hesperiinae
- Tribe: Erionotini; Distant, 1886

= Erionotini =

Tribe of butterflies

The Erionotini are a tribe of skipper butterflies in the subfamily Hesperiinae.

== Genera ==
- Acada
- Acerbas
- Acleros
- Actinor
- Aegiale
- Agathymus
- Alera
- Andronymus
- Apostictopterus
- Arnetta
- Artitropa
- Avestia Grishin, 2019
- Barca
- Caenides
- Ceratrichia
- Cerba Grishin, 2019
- Chondrolepis
- Cupitha
- Eetion
- Eogenes
- Erionota
- Fresna
- Fulda
- Galerga
- Gamia
- Gangara
- Ge
- Gorgyra
- Gretna
- Gyrogra
- Hidari
- Hyarotis
- Hypoleucis
- Ilma
- Isma
- Isoteinon
- Kedestes
- Leona
- Lotongus
- Lycas
- Malaza
- Matapa
- Megathymus
- Melphina
- Meza
- Miraja
- Moltena
- Monza
- Mopala
- Oerane
- Orses
- Osmodes
- Osphantes
- Paracleros
- Pardaleodes
- Paronymus
- Parosmodes
- Pemara
- Perichares
- Perrotia
- Pirdana
- Plastingia
- Platylesches
- Ploetzia
- Prada
- Praescobura
- Pseudokerana
- Pseudopirdana
- Pseudosarbia
- Pteroteinon
- Pudicitia
- Pyroneura
- Pyrrhopygopsis
- Quedara
- Rhabdomantis
- Salanoemia
- Scobura
- Semalea
- Stallingsia
- Suada
- Suastus
- Teniorhinus
- Tiacellia
- Tsitana
- Turnerina
- Unkana
- Xanthodisca
- Xanthoneura
- Zela
- Zographetus
- Zophopetes
