= Turnerina mejicanus =

Scientific classification
- Kingdom: Animalia
- Phylum: Arthropoda
- Clade: Pancrustacea
- Class: Insecta
- Order: Lepidoptera
- Family: Hesperiidae
- Genus: Turnerina
- Species: T. mejicanus

Binomial name
- Turnerina mejicanus (Bell, 1938)

Synonyms
- Megathymus mejicanus Bell, 1938

Species of butterfly

Turnerina mejicanus, sometimes referred to as the Mexican giant skipper, is a butterfly in the family Hesperiidae, subfamily Hesperiinae. It is one of three species in the genus Turnerina Freeman, 1959, and is known only from a small number of specimens collected in the Mexican state of Durango in the early twentieth century.

== Taxonomy ==
The species was first described by E. L. Bell in 1938 as Megathymus mejicanus, based on type material from Guanaceví, Durango, Mexico. It was subsequently transferred to the newly erected genus Turnerina by H. A. Freeman in 1959, along with the only other congener, T. hazelae (Stallings & Turner, 1958).

Turnerina belongs to the tribe Aegialini within the subfamily Hesperiinae, and is distinguished from the closely related genus Aegiale by the following combination of characters: the spot in interspace 1 is directed inward basally (rather than in line with the spots above it); the paronychium is broadly bilobed; the genitalia are simple in males but complex in females; the pupal cremaster is broadly spoonbilled with few hooks; and the larvae tunnel in an irregular pattern toward the base of the leaf, in contrast to Aegiale, in which the larvae tunnel directly to the leaf base.

== Distribution ==
Turnerina mejicanus is known only from the type series. The type locality is Guanaceví, Durango, Mexico, from which four males were recorded. A single female was collected at Río Campo, Mexico. No additional localities have been documented.

== Life history ==
The life history of T. mejicanus is unknown. The adults in the type series were collected in October 1903. The larvae are presumed, like others of the subtribe Megathymina, to feed within the tissues of a monocot host plant, likely a species of Agave.

== Conservation status ==
Turnerina mejicanus has not been assessed by the IUCN Red List. Given that it is known from only five specimens from two localities, it is among the least-collected members of the Megathymina.
