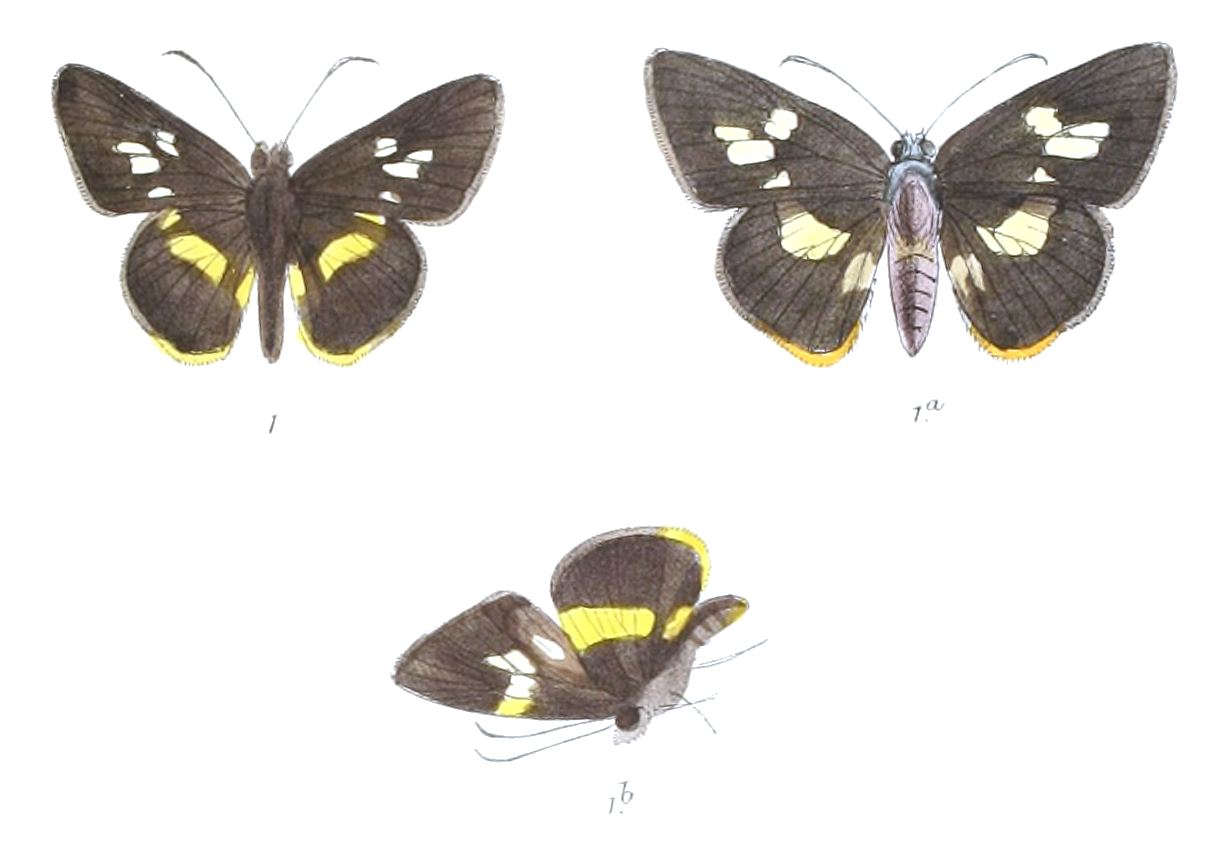
- Lotongus sarala

Scientific classification
- Kingdom: Animalia
- Phylum: Arthropoda
- Class: Insecta
- Order: Lepidoptera
- Family: Hesperiidae
- Tribe: Erionotini
- Genus: Lotongus; Distant, 1886

= Lotongus =

Genus of butterflies

Lotongus is a genus of grass skippers in the family Hesperiidae. The genus is confined to the Indomalayan realm.

== Species ==
- Lotongus calathus (Hewitson, 1876) Burma to Malaya
  - L. c. calathus Thailand, Langkawi, Malaysia, Tioman, Borneo, Sumatra, Bangka, Natuna, Palawan
  - L. c. taprobanus (Plötz, 1885) Celebes
  - L. c. balta Evans, 1949 Vietnam, Burma, Thailand, Laos
- Lotongus saralus (de Nicéville, 1889) Assam to W.China.
  - L. s. chinensis Evans, 1932 Burma, Thailand, Laos, N.Vietnam, Szechwan
  - L. s. quinquepunctus Joicey & Talbot, 1921 Hainan
- Lotongus sarala

=== Former species ===
- Lotongus avesta (Hewitson, 1868) - transferred to Avestia avesta (Hewitson, 1868)
