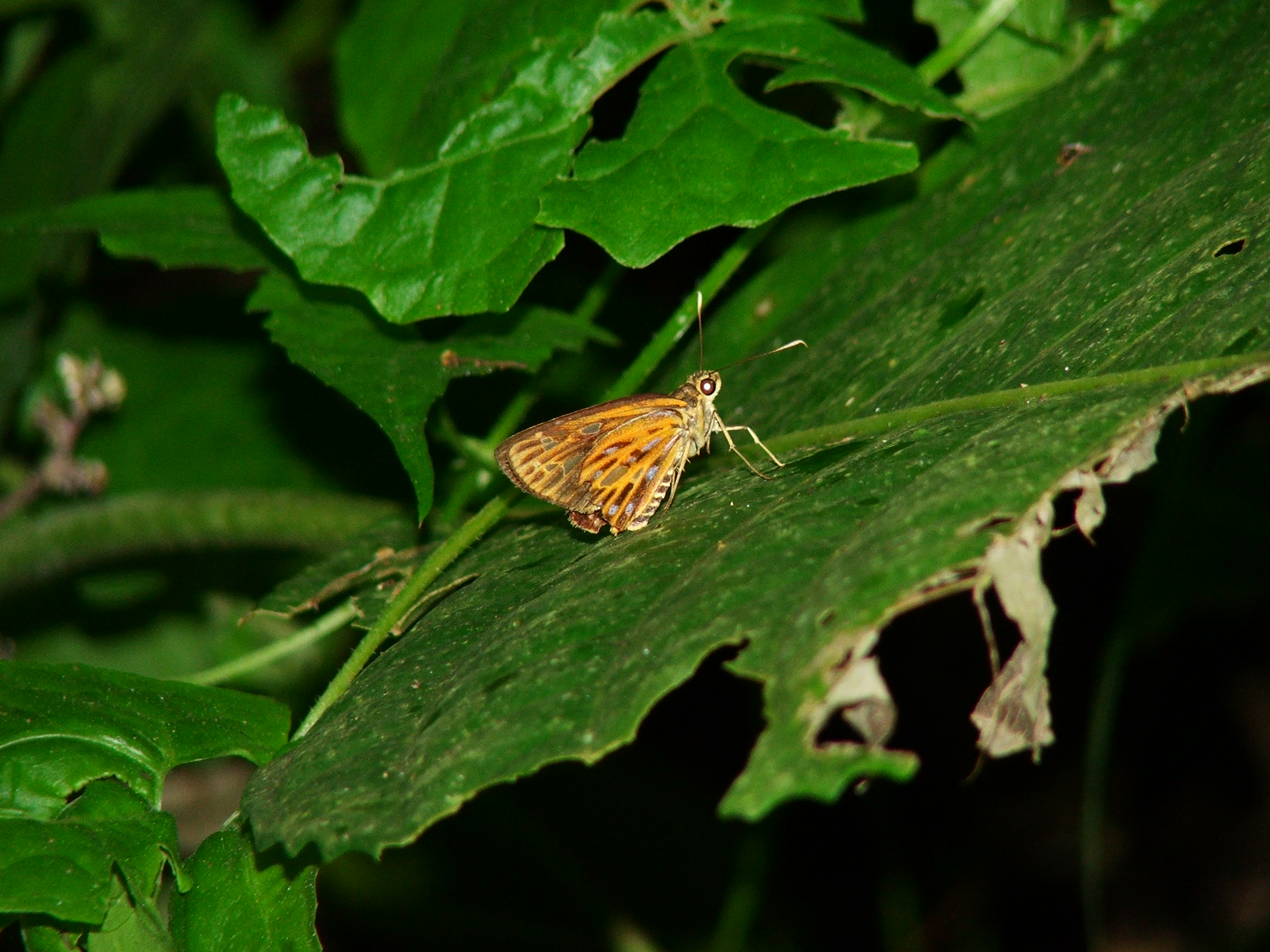
- Pyroneura latoia latoia

Scientific classification
- Kingdom: Animalia
- Phylum: Arthropoda
- Class: Insecta
- Order: Lepidoptera
- Family: Hesperiidae
- Tribe: Erionotini
- Genus: Pyroneura; Eliot in Corbet & Pendlebury, 1978

= Pyroneura =

Genus of butterflies

Pyroneura is an Indomalayan genus of grass skipper butterflies in the family Hesperiidae.

== Species ==
- Pyroneura toshikoae H. Hayashi, 1980
- Pyroneura helena (Butler, 1870) Sumatra, Malaya, Borneo
- Pyroneura natuna (Fruhstorfer, 1909) Thailand, Langkawi, Peninsular Malaya, Borneo, Natuna
- Pyroneura flavia (Staudinger, 1889) Thailand, Langkawi, Malaysia, Borneo, Sumatra, Java, Bali
- Pyroneura latoia (Hewitson, 1868) Malaya, Burma, Thailand, Langkawi, Singapore, Borneo, Sumatra, Lingga, Batoe, Java
- Pyroneura klanga (Evans, 1941) Malaya, Thailand
- Pyroneura derna (Evans, 1941) Burma, Thailand, Malaysia, Tioman, Borneo, Simeulue, Siberut, Sumatra, Palawan
- Pyroneura niasana (Fruhstorfer, 1909) Assam, Burma, Thailand, Langkawi, Malaya, Borneo, Sumatra, Palawan
- Pyroneura agnesia (Eliot, 1967) Malaya, Brunei
- Pyroneura perakana (Evans, 1926) Malaya, Thailand
- Pyroneura aurantiaca (Elwes & Edwards, 1897) Malaya, Java
- Pyroneura margherita (Doherty, 1889) Vietnam, Burma, Thailand, Laos
- Pyroneura callineura (C. & R. Felder, [1867]) Malaya, Borneo, Java, Sumatra
- Pyroneura vermiculata (Hewitson, 1878) Sumatra
- Pyroneura liburnia (Hewitson, 1868) Philippines
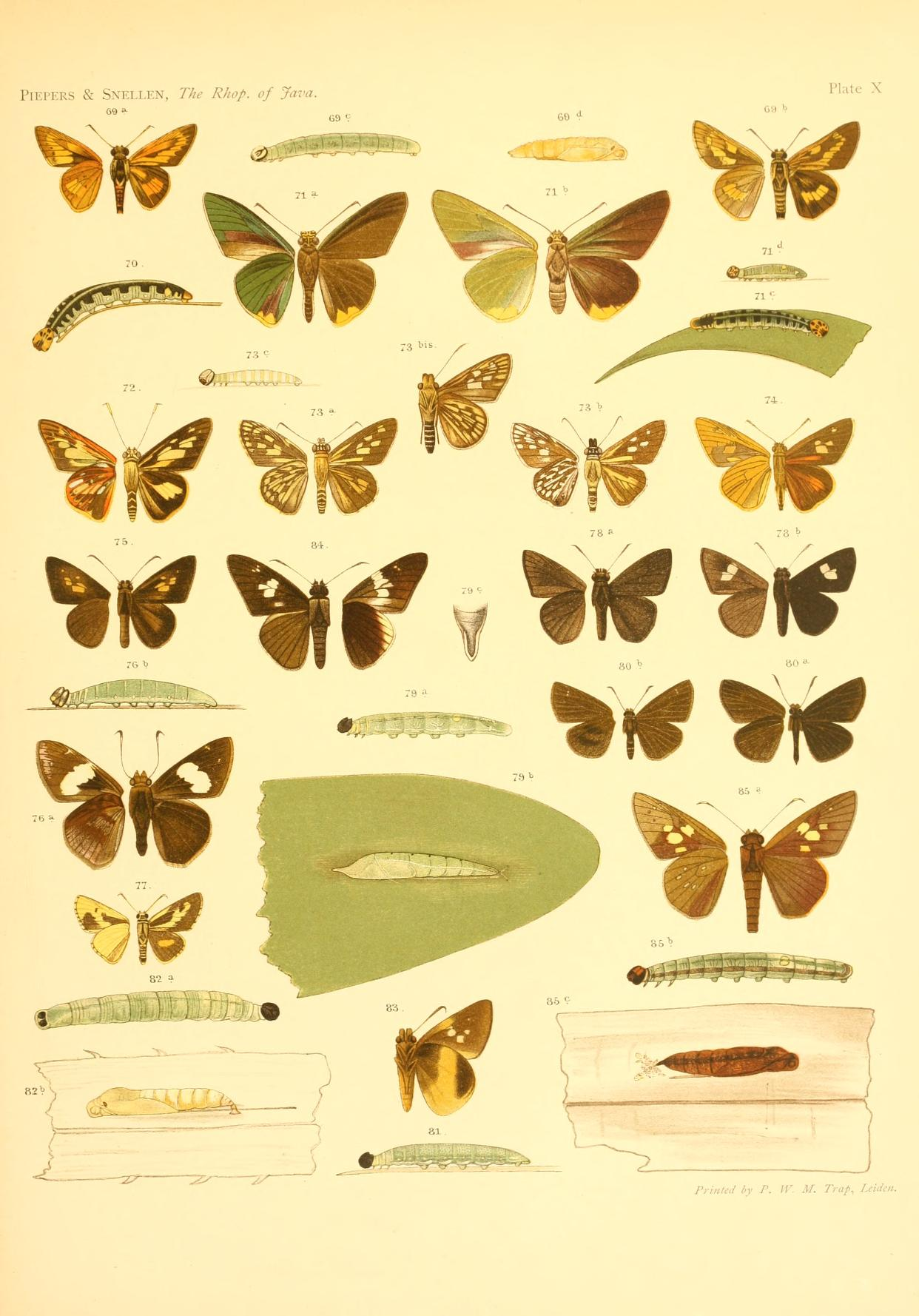
P. callineura in Piepers and Snellen The Rhopalocera of Java

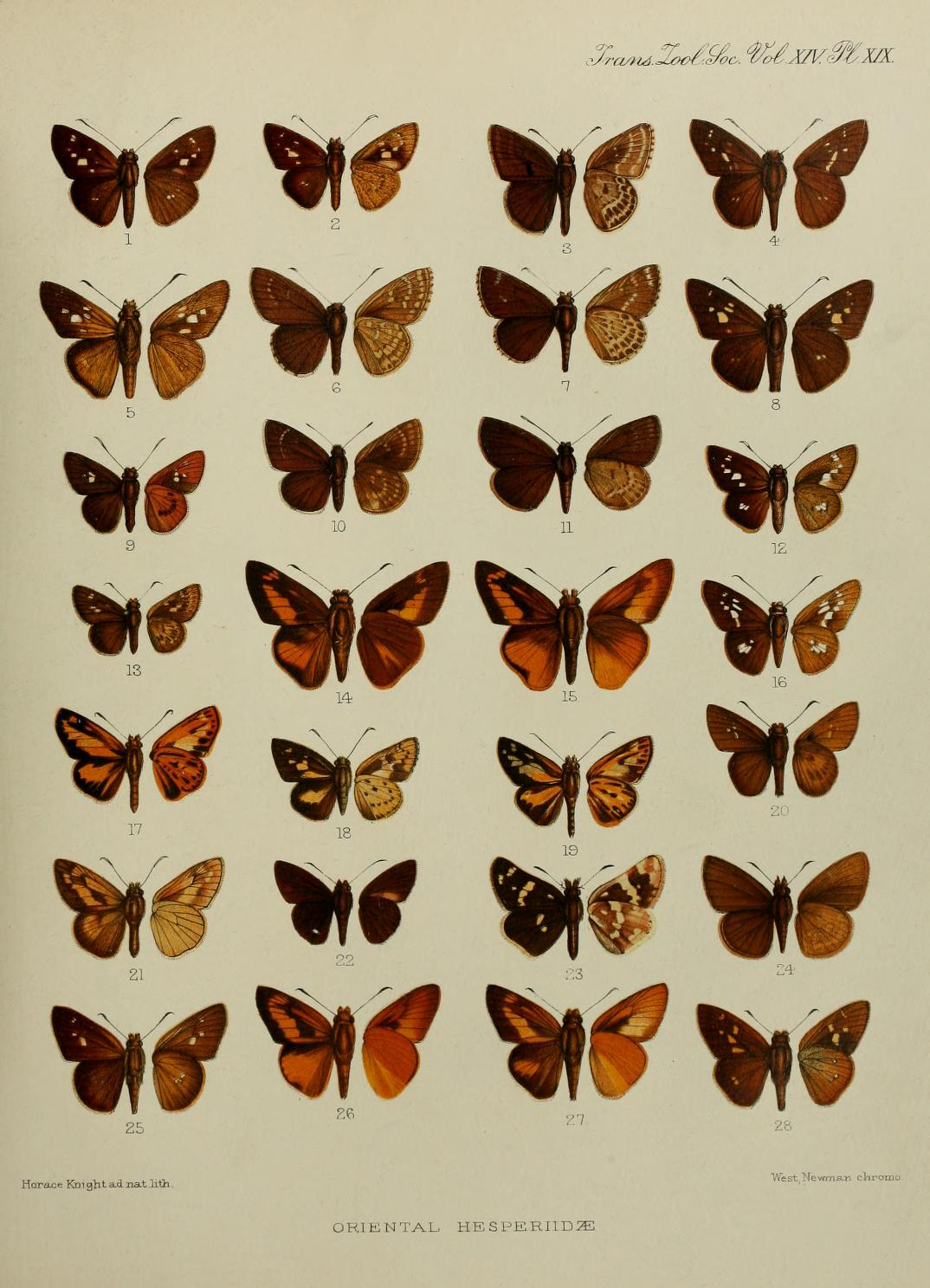
P. aurantiaca in Elwes & Edwards, 1897

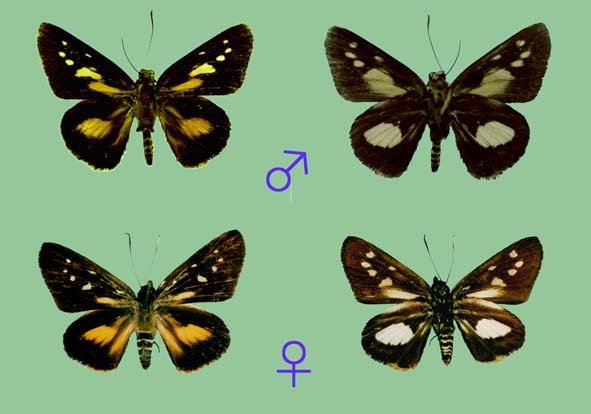
P. toshikoae male and female
