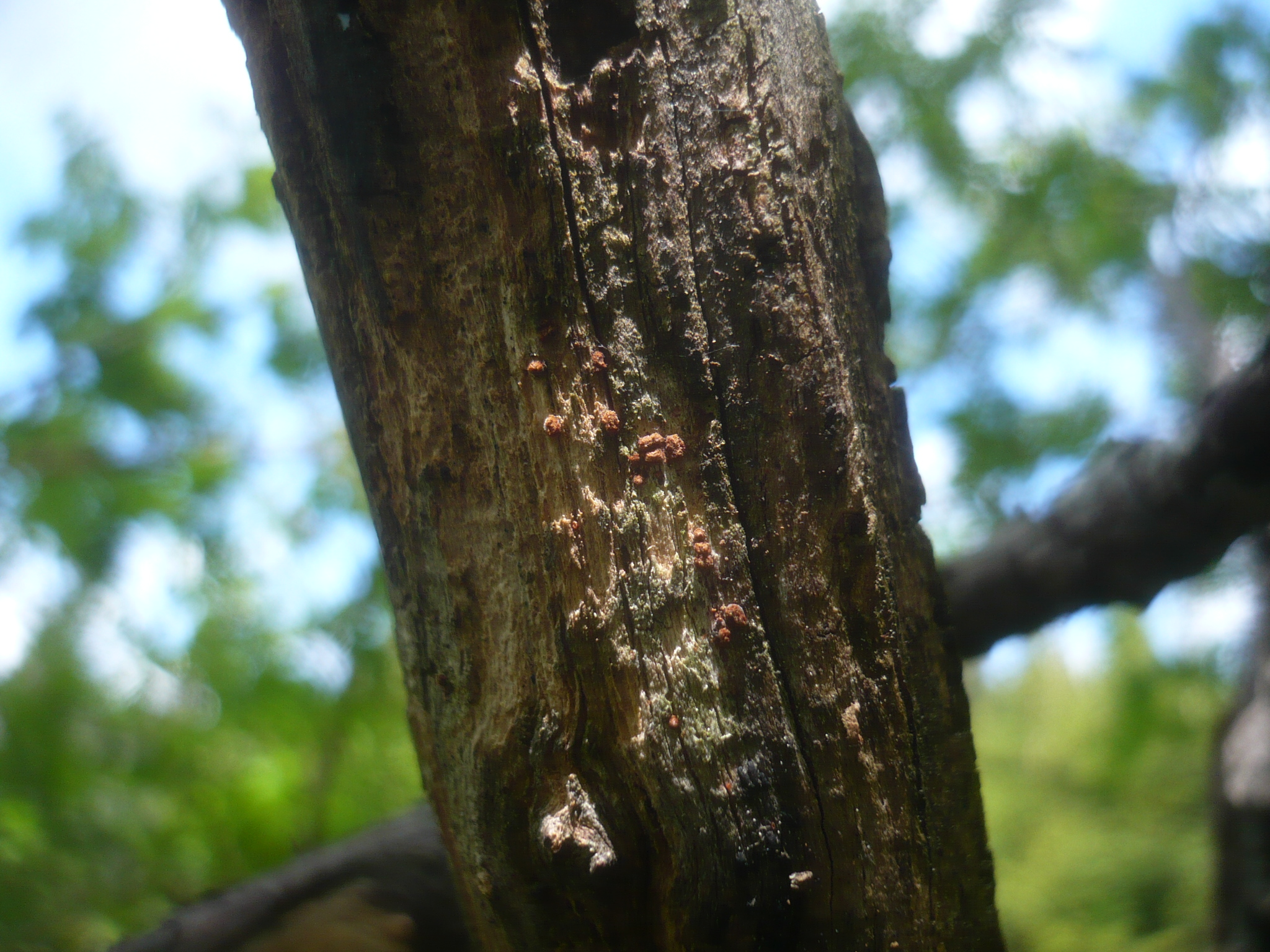
- Perrotia flammea

Scientific classification
- Kingdom: Animalia
- Phylum: Arthropoda
- Clade: Pancrustacea
- Class: Insecta
- Order: Lepidoptera
- Family: Hesperiidae
- Subfamily: Hesperiinae
- Tribe: Erionotini
- Genus: Perrotia; Oberthür, 1916

Synonyms
- Miraja Evans, 1937

= Perrotia =

Genus of butterflies

Perrotia is a genus of skippers in the family Hesperiidae.

== Species ==
- Perrotia albiplaga Oberthür, 1916
- Perrotia eximia (Oberthür, 1923)
- Perrotia flora (Oberthür, 1923)
- Perrotia gillias (Mabille, 1878)
- Perrotia howa (Mabille, 1876)
- Perrotia ismael (Oberthür, 1916)
- Perrotia kingdoni (Butler, 1879)
- Perrotia malchus (Mabille, 1879)
- Perrotia ochracea (Evans, 1937)
- Perrotia paroechus (Mabille, [1887])
- Perrotia silvestralis (Viette, 1956)
- Perrotia sylvia (Evans, 1937)
- Perrotia varians (Oberthür, 1916)
