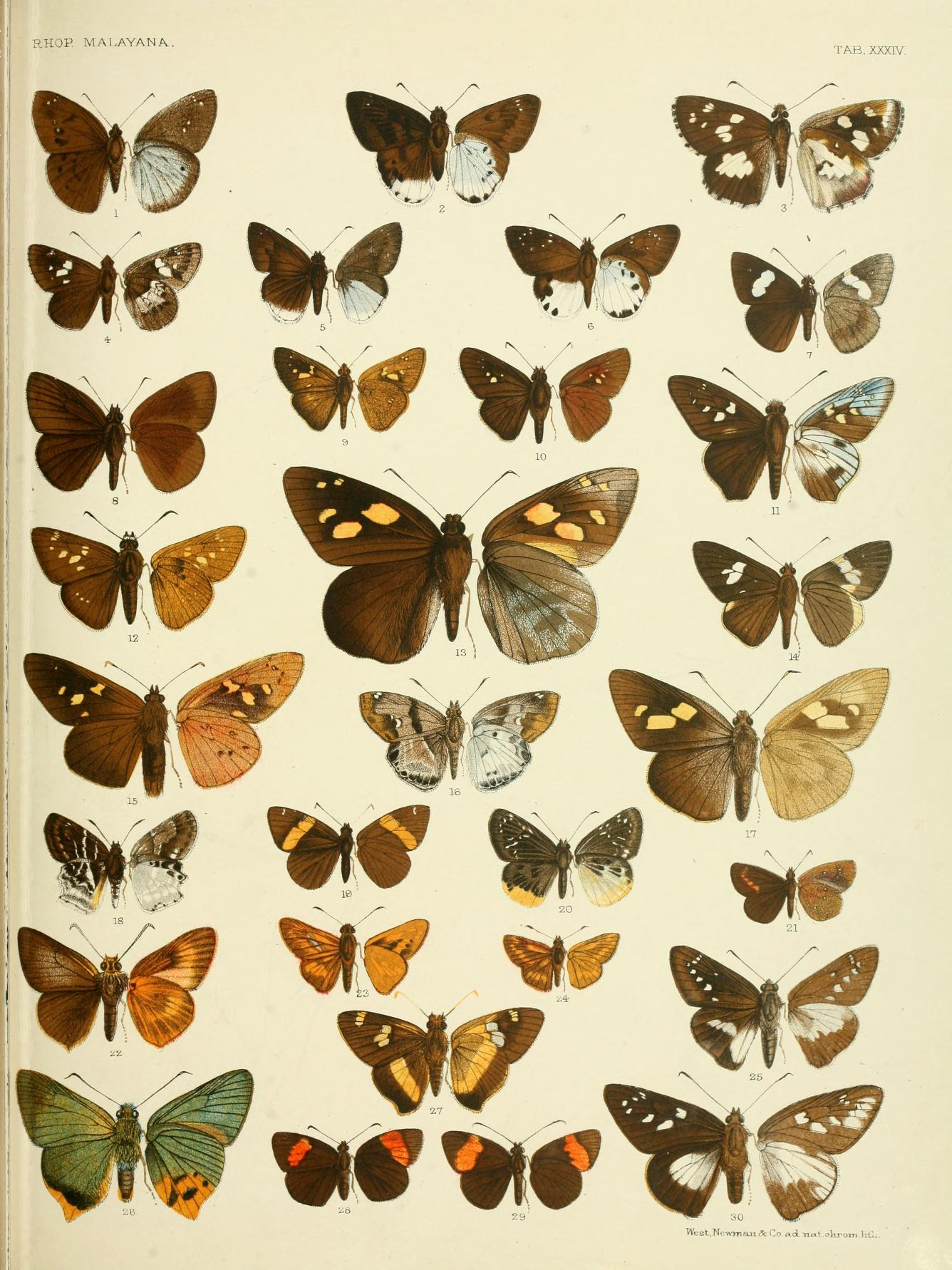
- Unkana ambasa batara Distant, 1886 in Rhopalocera Malayana

Scientific classification
- Kingdom: Animalia
- Phylum: Arthropoda
- Class: Insecta
- Order: Lepidoptera
- Family: Hesperiidae
- Tribe: Erionotini
- Genus: Unkana; Distant, 1886

= Unkana =

Genus of butterflies

Unkana is a genus of grass skipper in the family Hesperiidae. The genus is confined to the Indomalayan realm.

== Species ==
- Unkana ambasa (Moore, [1858])
  - U. a. ambasa Sumatra, Malaya, Philippines, Java
  - U. a. attina (Hewitson, [1866]) S.Vietnam, Burma, Thailand, Laos
  - U. a. batara Distant, 1886 S.Vietnam, Malaya, Thailand, Langkawi, Singapore, Borneo, Sumatra, Batoe
  - U. a. tranga Evans, 1949 Nias
- Unkana flava Evans, 1932 Burma, N.Thailand, Laos, N.Vietnam.
- Unkana mindanensis Fruhstorfer, 1911 Philippines
- Unkana mytheca (Hewitson, 1877)
  - U. m. mytheca Malaya, S.Burma, Thailand, Malaysia, Borneo, Sumatra, Bangka
  - U. m. kala (Evans, 1932) Nias
