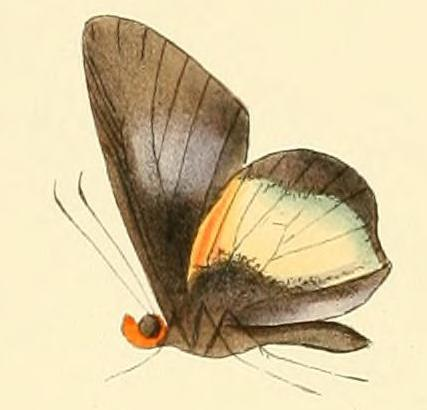

Scientific classification
- Kingdom: Animalia
- Phylum: Arthropoda
- Class: Insecta
- Order: Lepidoptera
- Family: Hesperiidae
- Subfamily: Hesperiinae
- Tribe: Erionotini
- Genus: Tiacellia; Evans, 1949
- Species: T. tiacellia

Binomial name
- Tiacellia tiacellia (Hewitson, 1868)

Synonyms
- Hesperia tiacellia Hewitson, 1868

= Tiacellia =

Genus of butterflies

Tiacellia is a genus of skippers in the family Hesperiidae. It contains only one species, Tiacellia tiacellia, which is found on Aru.
