= Praescobura =

Scientific classification
- Kingdom: Animalia
- Phylum: Arthropoda
- Class: Insecta
- Order: Lepidoptera
- Family: Hesperiidae
- Subfamily: Hesperiinae
- Tribe: Erionotini
- Genus: Praescobura; Devyatkin, 2002
- Species: P. chrysomaculata

Binomial name
- Praescobura chrysomaculata Devyatkin, 2002

Genus of butterflies

Praescobura is a butterfly genus of skippers. It contains only one species, Praescobura chrysomaculata, which is found in northern Vietnam.
