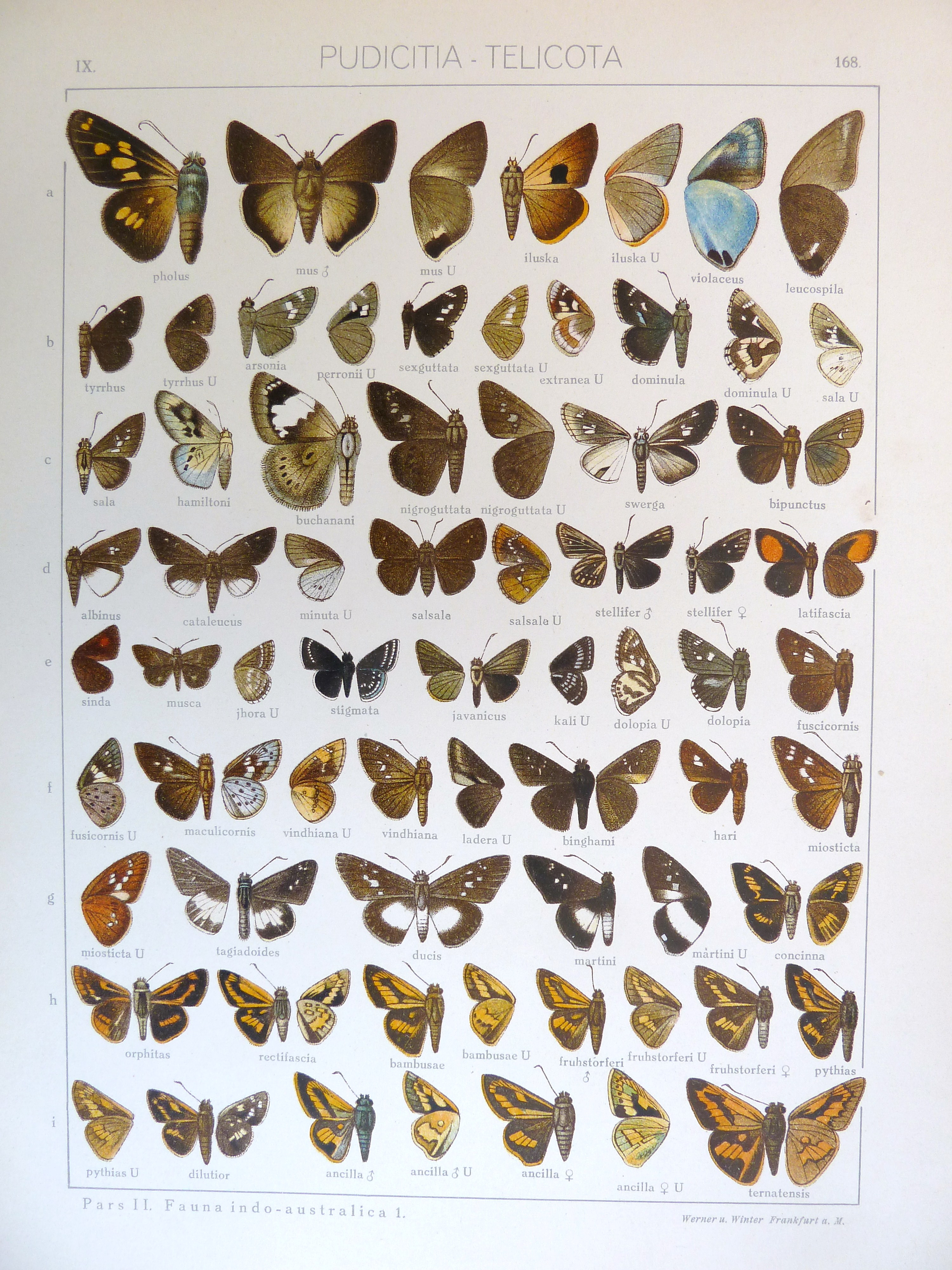
- Pudicitia pholus in Seitz

Scientific classification
- Kingdom: Animalia
- Phylum: Arthropoda
- Class: Insecta
- Order: Lepidoptera
- Family: Hesperiidae
- Tribe: Erionotini
- Genus: Pudicitia de Nicéville, 1895
- Species: P. pholus

Binomial name
- Pudicitia pholus de Nicéville, 1889

= Pudicitia (butterfly) =

Genus of butterflies

Pudicitia is a genus of grass skippers in the family Hesperiidae. It is monotypic, containing the single species Pudicitia pholus (de Nicéville, 1889) from Assam and Bhutan.
