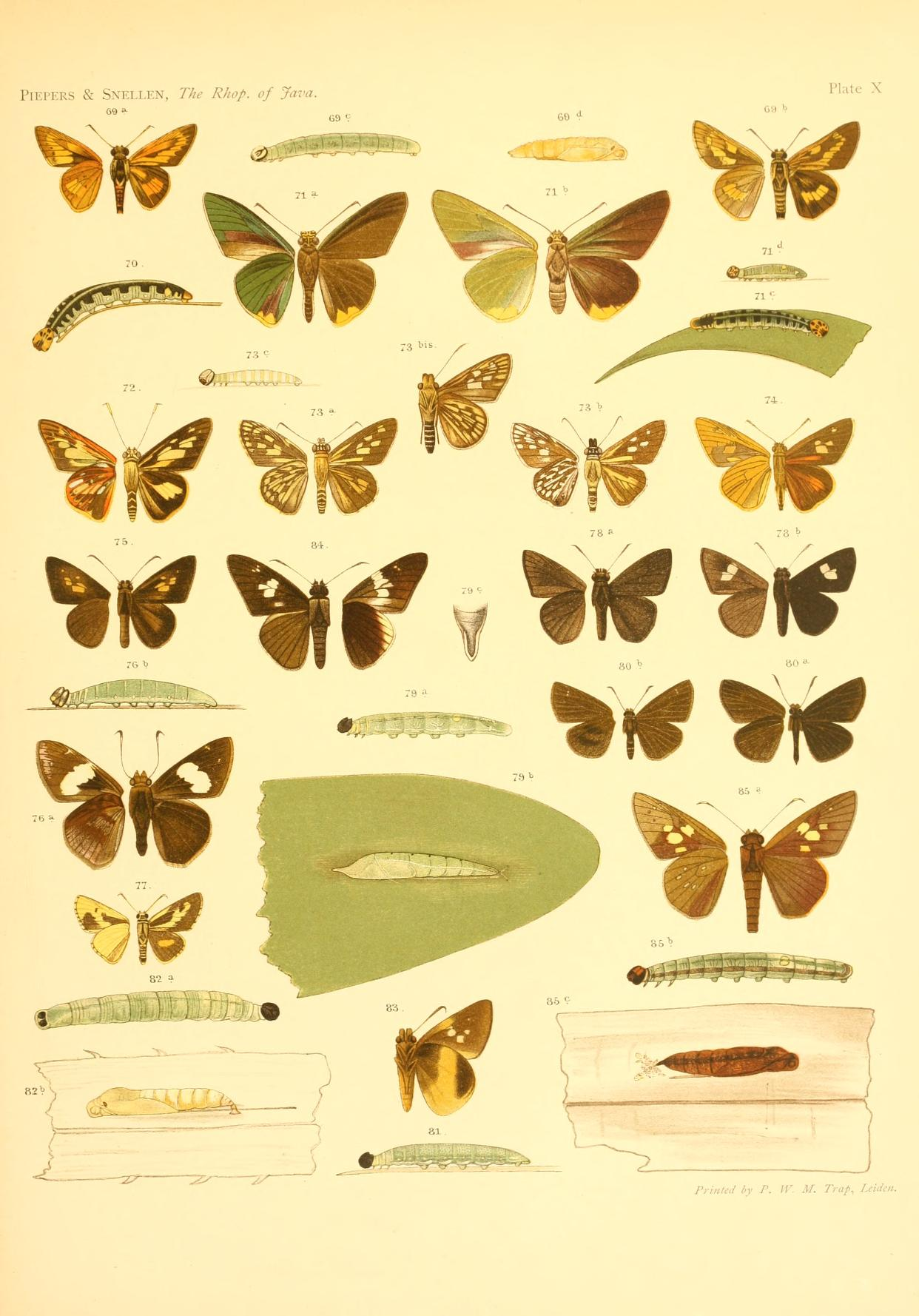
- Zela onara in Rhopalocera of Java (figure 83)

Scientific classification
- Kingdom: Animalia
- Phylum: Arthropoda
- Class: Insecta
- Order: Lepidoptera
- Family: Hesperiidae
- Tribe: Erionotini
- Genus: Zela de Niceville 1895

Species
- Numerous, see text

Synonyms
- Matapoides Druce, 1912; Zampa de Nicéville, 1895

= Zela (skipper) =

Genus of butterflies

Zela is an Indomalayan genus of grass skippers.

== Species ==
- Zela cowani Evans, [1939] Peninsula Malaya
- Zela elioti Evans, [1939] Thailand, Langkawi, Malaysia, Tioman
- Zela excellens (Staudinger, 1889) Thailand, Langkawi, Malaysia, Borneo, Sumatra, Siberut, Palawan
- Zela onara (Butler, 1870) Thailand, Malaysia, Borneo, Sumatra, Java
- Zela smaragdinus (H. H. Druce, 1912) Thailand, Langkawi, Malaysia, Borneo
- Zela zenon (de Nicéville, 1895) Borneo
- Zela zero Evans, 1932
- Zela zeta Devyatkin, 2007
- Zela zeus de Nicéville, 1895 Assam to Malaya, Burma, Philippines, Thailand, Langkawi

== Biology ==
The larvae feed on Palmae including Calamus
