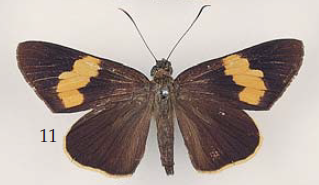

Scientific classification
- Kingdom: Animalia
- Phylum: Arthropoda
- Class: Insecta
- Order: Lepidoptera
- Family: Hesperiidae
- Subfamily: Hesperiinae
- Tribe: Erionotini
- Genus: Ilma; Swinhoe, 1905
- Species: I. irvina

Binomial name
- Ilma irvina (Plötz, 1886)

= Ilma =

Ilma irvina

Genus of butterflies

Ilma is a genus of skippers in the family Hesperiidae. It is monotypic, being represented by the single species, Ilma irvina.
