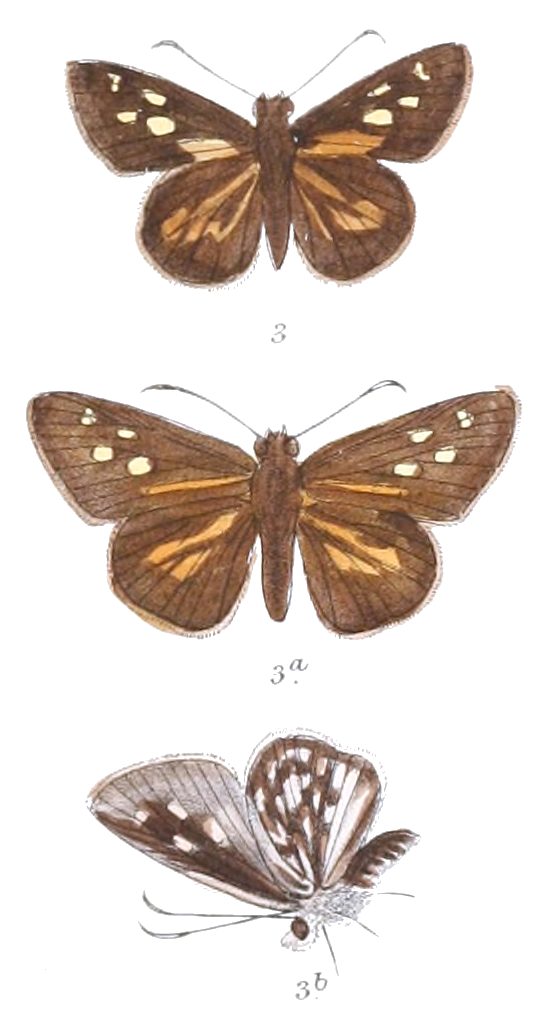

Scientific classification
- Kingdom: Animalia
- Phylum: Arthropoda
- Class: Insecta
- Order: Lepidoptera
- Family: Hesperiidae
- Genus: Plastingia
- Species: P. naga

Binomial name
- Plastingia naga (de Niceville, 1884)

Synonyms
- Hesperia naga de Nicéville, [1884]; Plastingia palawata Staudinger, 1889; Plastingia valenia Fruhstorfer, 1909; Plastingia naga valenia Fruhstorfer, 1909

= Plastingia naga =

Species of butterfly

Plastingia naga, the chequered lancer or silver-spot lancer, is a butterfly belonging to the family Hesperiidae and sub-family Hesperiinae. It has a wingspan between 33–38 mm.

== Description ==
The underside markings of the chequered lancer consist of black veins and black rectangular spots on a greyish-white ground colour. The upperside has yellow-orange streaks at the wing bases. The upperside forewing of the male is dark brown with white hyaline (glass-like) spots, including two cell spots, at the cell-end and above the discal spot in space 2. There are also other spots in spaces 3, 6, and 7 as well as a non-hyaline streak in space 1b. The hindwing has an obscure, pale yellow cell streak and inter-neural streaks. Females are generally larger in size, darker and have less spots than the male. The spots in space 7 and the lower cell spot on the forewing may be absent. The abdomen of the chequered lancer is striped black and white, whilst the antenna has a whitish band just after the club.

== Distribution ==
The chequered lancer has a wide distribution. It can be found from Assam to Myanmar, Thailand, Laos, Malaysia, Singapore, Borneo, Indonesia, and the Philippines.

== Habitat ==
The chequered lancer prefers shaded localities and is usually found in forests.

== Habits ==
The species is fast-flying and is usually active from early morning to noon. However, it usually prefers to rest in the shady forest understorey for the rest of the day. When disturbed, the chequered lancer takes off at high speeds, but often returns to a few of its favourite perches to rest with its wings folded upright.

== Host plant ==
The species' host plant is the Caryota mitis, also known as the fishtail palm.
