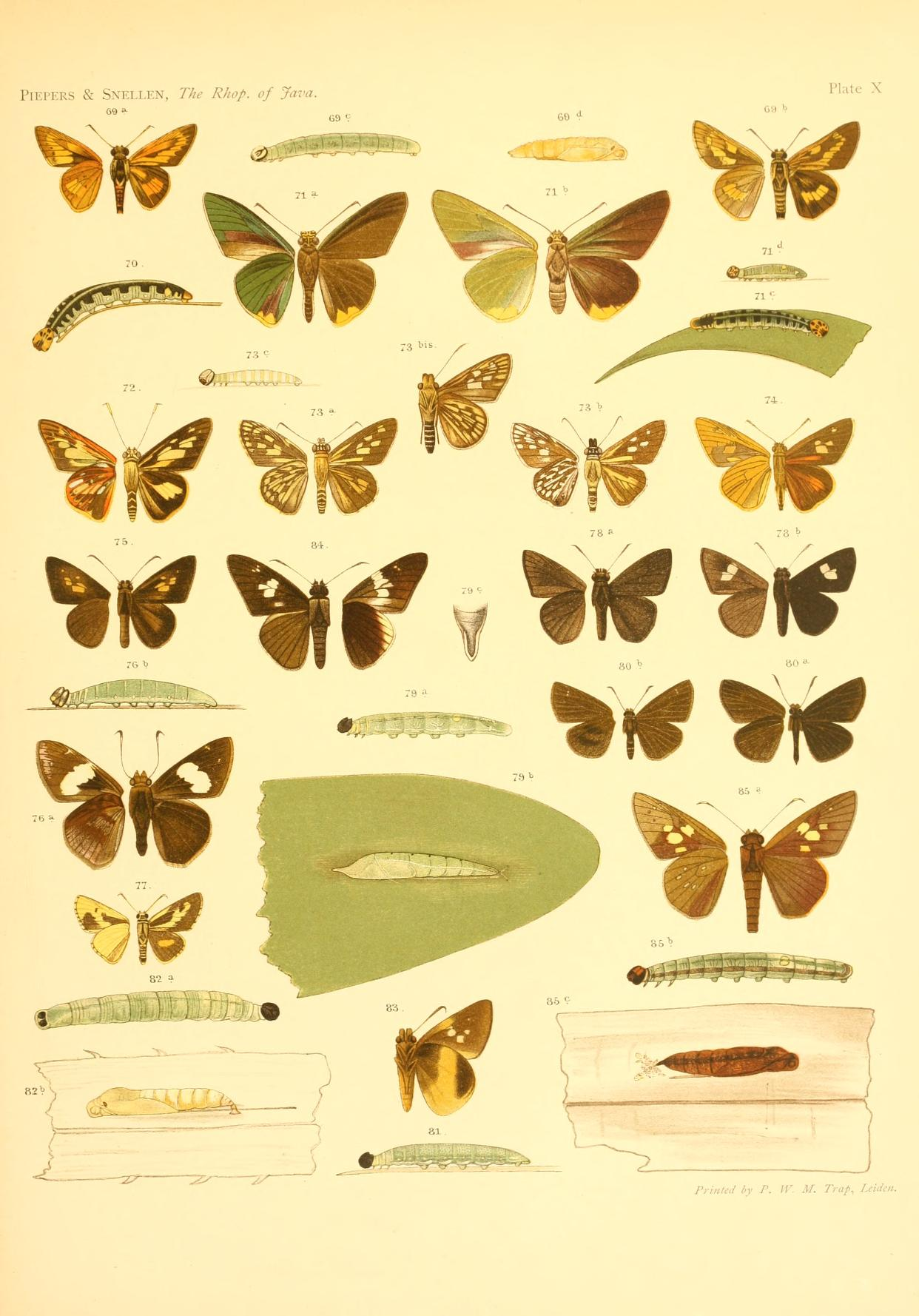
- Plastingia tessellata (figure 73) and Plastingia naga (figure 73 bis)

Scientific classification
- Kingdom: Animalia
- Phylum: Arthropoda
- Class: Insecta
- Order: Lepidoptera
- Family: Hesperiidae
- Subfamily: Hesperiinae
- Tribe: Erionotini
- Genus: Plastingia; Butler, 1870

= Plastingia =

Genus of butterflies

Plastingia is a genus of grass skipper butterflies in the family Hesperiidae.

== Species ==
- Plastingia naga (de Niceville, 1884) - chequered or silver-spot lancer
- Plastingia pellonia Fruhstorfer, 1909 Burma, Thailand, Malaysia, Singapore, Borneo, Sumatra, Bangka, Java, Bali, Palawan
- Plastingia flavescens (C. & R. Felder, [1867]) Celebes
- Plastingia viburnia Semper, 1892 Philippines
- Plastingia mangola Evans, 1949 Celebes
- Plastingia tessellata (Hewitson, [1866]) Celebes
- Plastingia titei Cantlie & Norman, 1960 Assam

== Biology ==
The larvae feed on Palmae including Caryota
