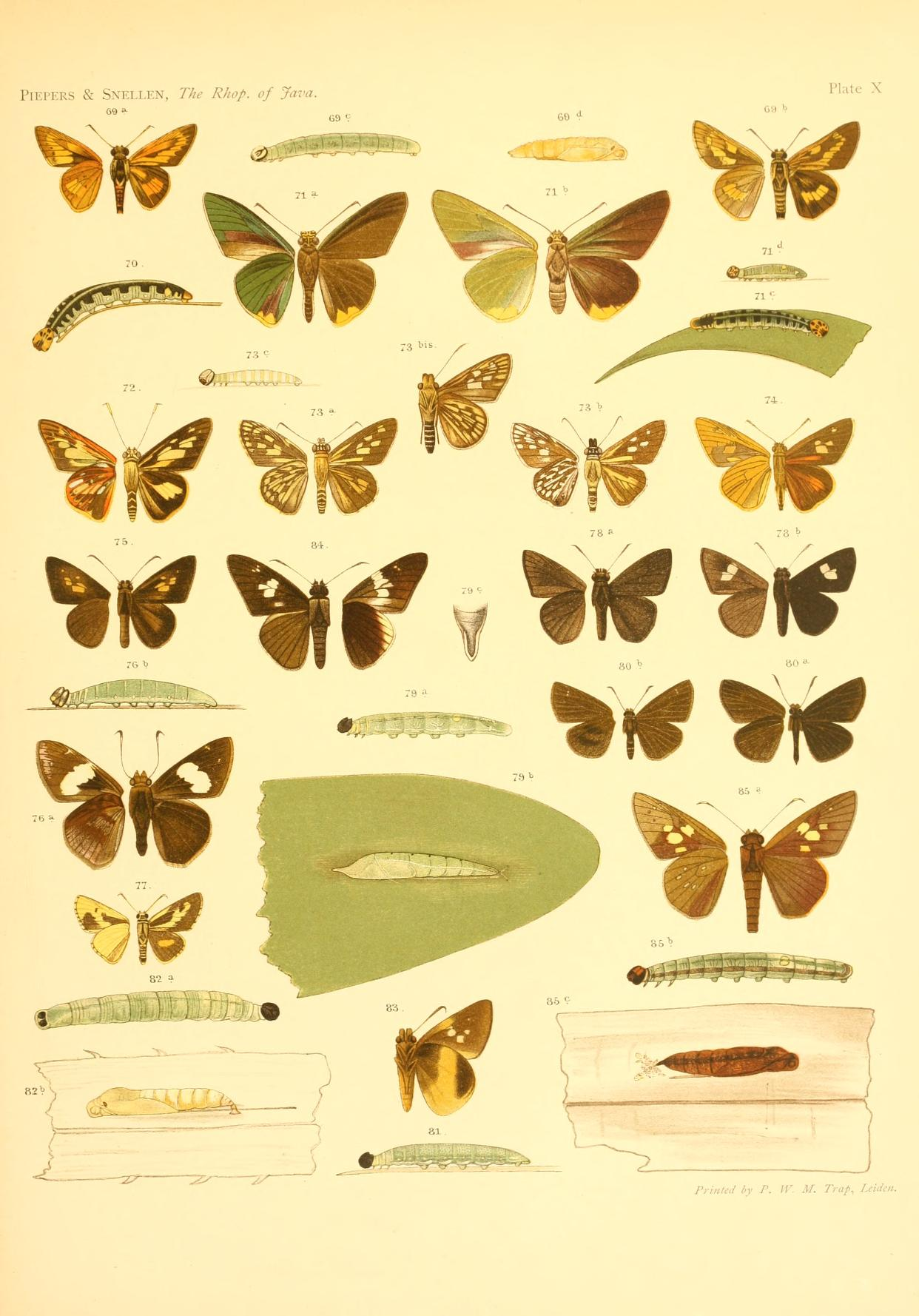
- Xanthoneura corissa in Rhopalocera of Java (figure 74)

Scientific classification
- Kingdom: Animalia
- Phylum: Arthropoda
- Class: Insecta
- Order: Lepidoptera
- Family: Hesperiidae
- Tribe: Erionotini
- Genus: Xanthoneura; Eliot, 1978

= Xanthoneura =

Genus of butterflies

Xanthoneura is an Indomalayan genus of grass skippers in the family Hesperiidae.

== Species ==
- Xanthoneura corissa (Hewitson, 1876)
  - X. c. indrasana (Elwes & de Nicéville, [1887]) Burma, Thailand, Laos, Malaya, Borneo
  - X. c. patmapana (Fruhstorfer, 1911) Java
- Xanthoneura telesinus (Mabille, 1878) Philippines
- Xanthoneura kazuhisai Maruyama, 1989
