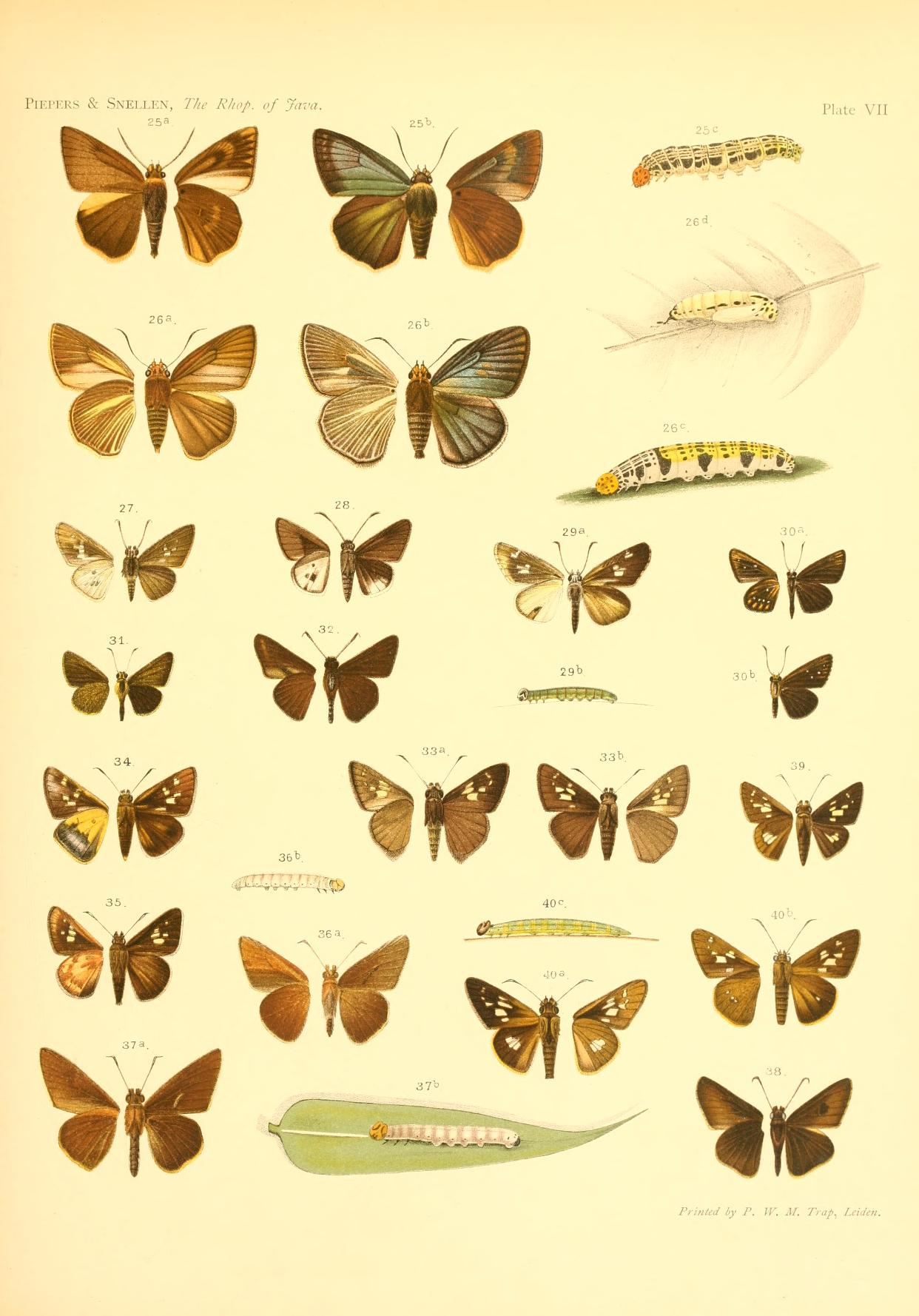
- Piepers and Snellen Rhopalocera of Java Plate VII Figure 38

Scientific classification
- Kingdom: Animalia
- Phylum: Arthropoda
- Clade: Pancrustacea
- Class: Insecta
- Order: Lepidoptera
- Family: Hesperiidae
- Subfamily: Hesperiinae
- Tribe: Erionotini
- Genus: Ge de Nicéville, 1895
- Species: G. geta

Binomial name
- Ge geta de Nicéville, 1895

= Ge geta =

Genus of butterflies

Ge is a genus of grass skipper butterflies in the family Hesperiidae described by Lionel de Nicéville in 1895. It is monotypic, containing the single species Ge geta, described in the same publication, and is found in Borneo, Sumatra, Nias, Batoe, Java, Burma, Thailand, Langkawi and Malaya.

== Original description ==
Description : Male.Upperside, both wings shining dark brown, immaculate. Cilia cinereous. Forewing with the sexual small round dense raised tuft of hairs towards the base of the first median interspace jet-black. Hindwing with a large rounded space in the middle of the wing paler than the rest of the surface composed of modified scales. Underside, both wings coloured as on the upperside. Forewing with a broad dark ochreous fascia commencing on the inner margin extending on to the disc, and just enclosing the disc-like “male-mark” on its basal edge. Hindwing unmarked. Cilia of both wings pale ochreous. Head, antenne, palpi, body, and legs dark brown.Described from two examples in my collection—one from Penang, the other from N.-E. Sumatra; the latter kindly sent to me by Hofrath Dr, L. Martin, who has other specimens in his own collection.
