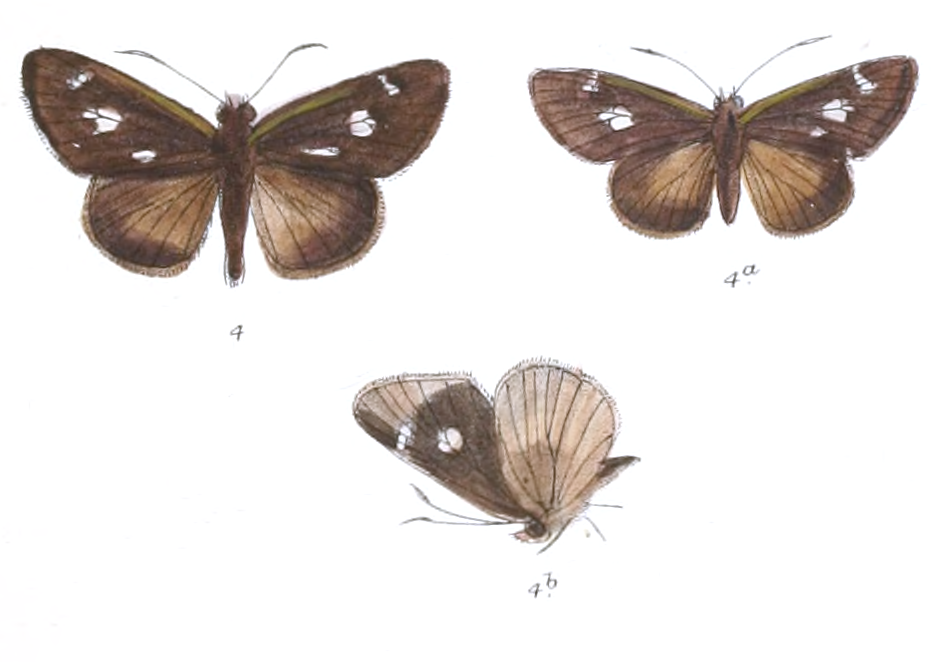
- Suada swerga

Scientific classification
- Kingdom: Animalia
- Phylum: Arthropoda
- Class: Insecta
- Order: Lepidoptera
- Family: Hesperiidae
- Tribe: Erionotini
- Genus: Suada de Nicéville, 1895

= Suada (butterfly) =

Genus of butterflies

Suada is a genus of grass skippers in the family Hesperiidae.

== Species ==
- Suada swerga (de Nicéville, [1884]) Ceylon, Malaya, Java, Vietnam, Burma, Thailand, Laos
- Suada albolineata Devyatkin, 2000 Vietnam
- Suada albinus (Semper, 1892) Philippines
- Suada cataleucos (Staudinger, 1889) Philippines, Palawan

== Biology ==
The larvae feed on Gramineae including Dendrocalamus.

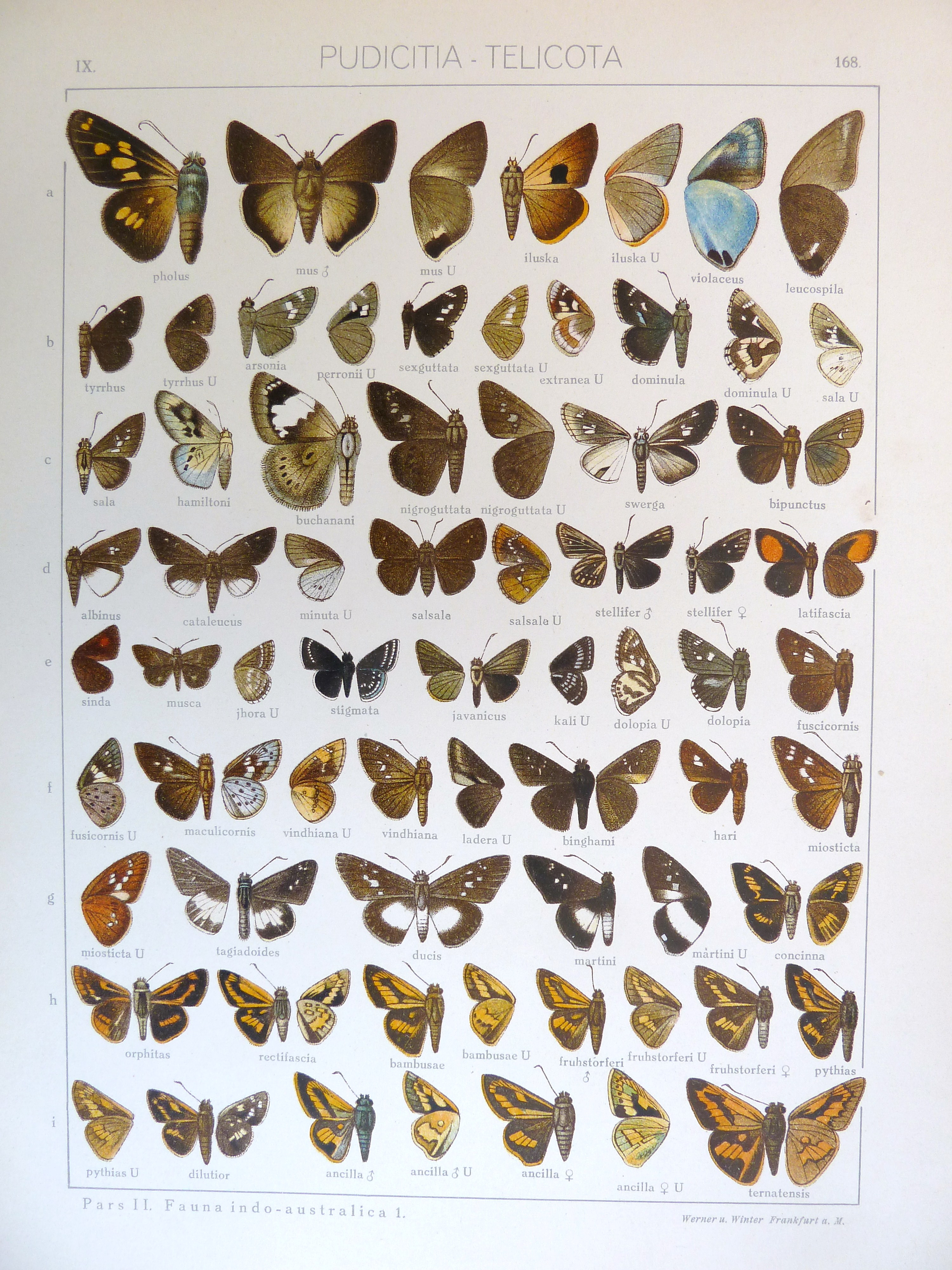
Suada swerga De Nicéville, 1883, Suada albinus Semper, 1892 and Suada cataleucos (Staudinger, 1889) in Seitz
