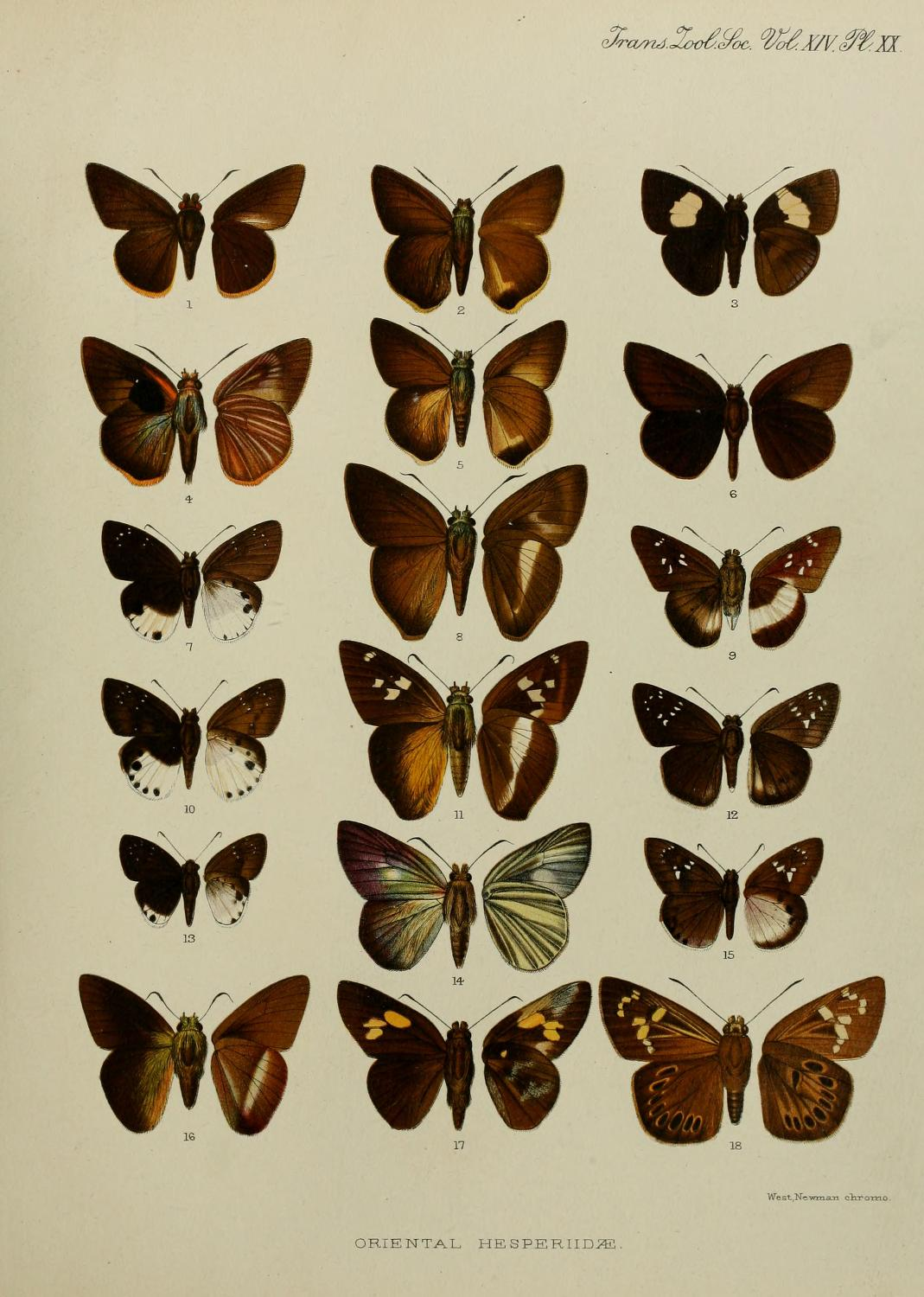
- Acerbas nitidifasciata Elwes & Edwards, 1897 (figure 9)

Scientific classification
- Kingdom: Animalia
- Phylum: Arthropoda
- Class: Insecta
- Order: Lepidoptera
- Family: Hesperiidae
- Subfamily: Hesperiinae
- Tribe: Erionotini
- Genus: Acerbas de Nicéville, 1895

= Acerbas (skipper) =

Genus of skipper butterflies in tribe Erionotini

Acerbas is an Indomalayan genus of skipper butterflies.

== Species ==
Species in Acerbas are:

- Acerbas anthea (Hewitson, 1868) (Burma to Malaya, Java, Cambodia, Luzon)
- Acerbas azona (Hewitson, 1866) (Celebes)
- Acerbas duris (Mabille, 1883) (Philippines)
- Acerbas latefascia de Jong, 1982 (Celebes)
- Acerbas nitidifasciata Elwes & Edwards, 1897
- Acerbas sarala (de Nicéville, 1889)
- Acerbas selta Evans, 1949 (Borneo)
- Acerbas suttoni Russel, 1984 (Celebes)

=== Former species ===
- Acerbas martini (Distant and Pryer, 1887) - transferred to Cerba martini (Distant and Pryer, 1887)

== Biology ==
Acerbas anthea larvae feed on Calamus.

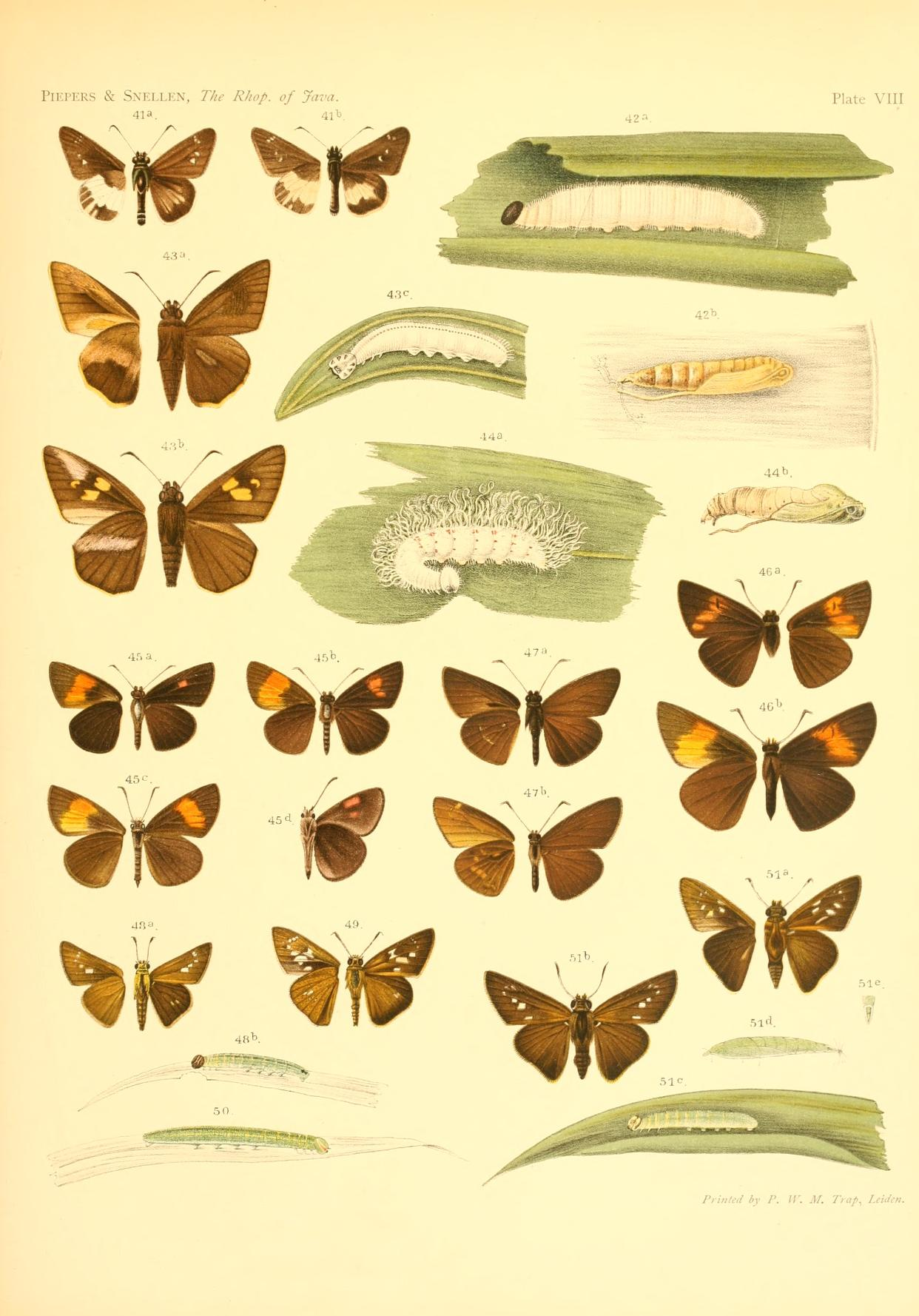
Acerbas anthea in Piepers and Snellen The Rhopalocera of Java

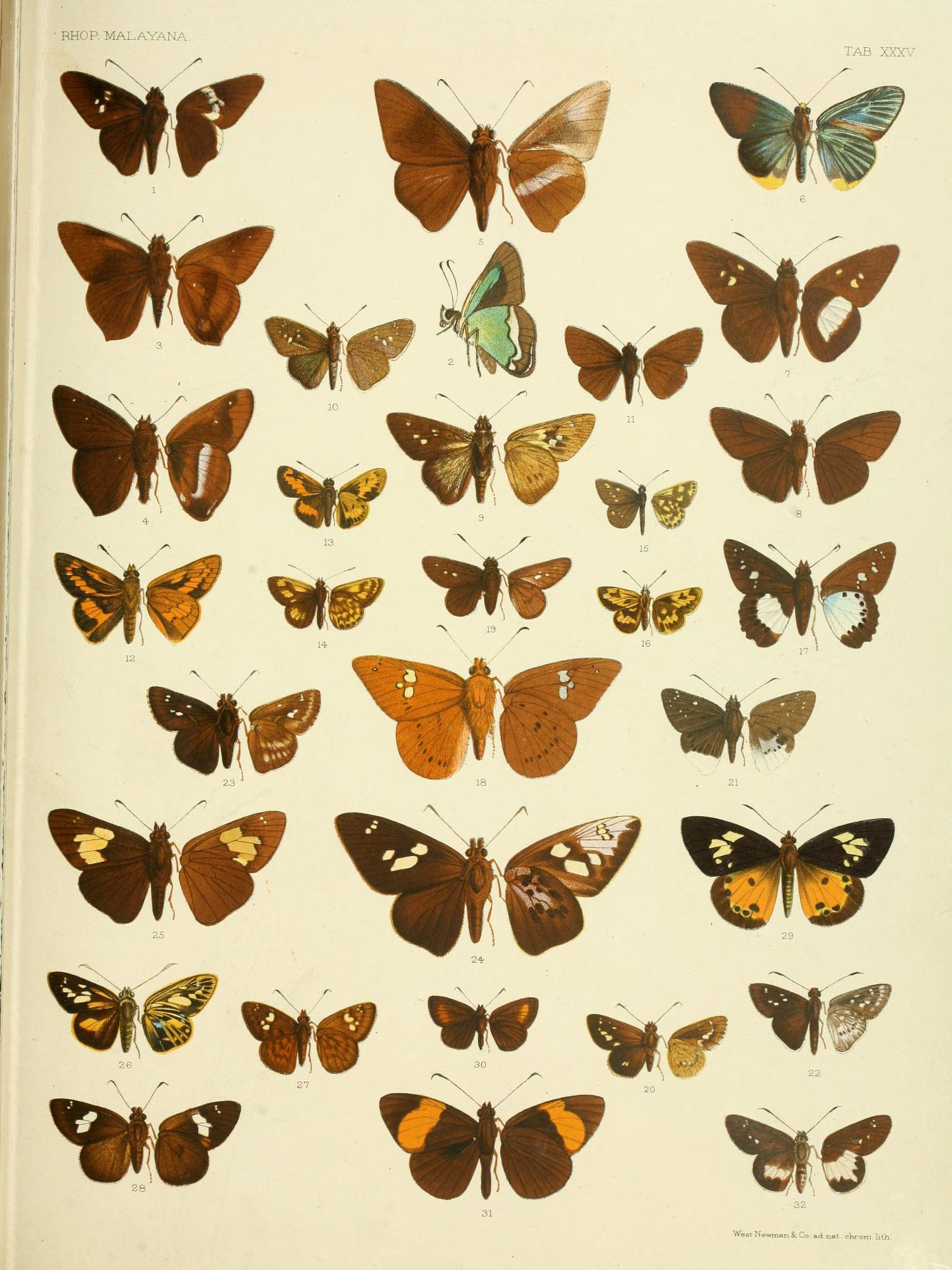
Acerbas anthea in Rhopalocera Malayana
