= Turnerina =

Scientific classification
- Kingdom: Animalia
- Phylum: Arthropoda
- Clade: Pancrustacea
- Class: Insecta
- Order: Lepidoptera
- Family: Hesperiidae
- Subfamily: Hesperiinae
- Tribe: Megathymini
- Genus: Turnerina; Freeman, 1959

Species
- Turnerina hazelae (Stallings & Turner, 1958); Turnerina mejicanus (Bell, 1938)

Genus of butterflies

Turnerina is a genus of skipper butterflies in the family Hesperiidae, subfamily Hesperiinae, tribe Megathymini, erected by H. A. Freeman in 1959. The genus is endemic to Mexico.
