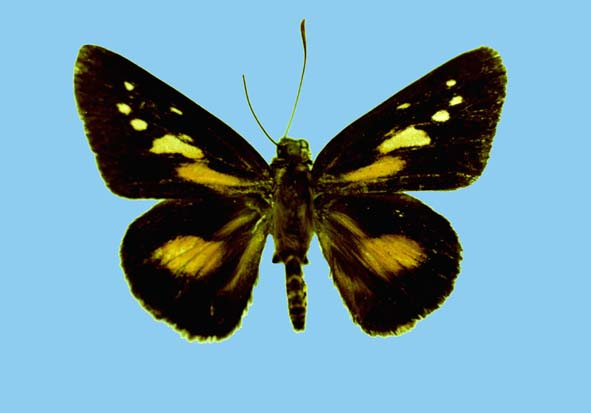
- Male upperside
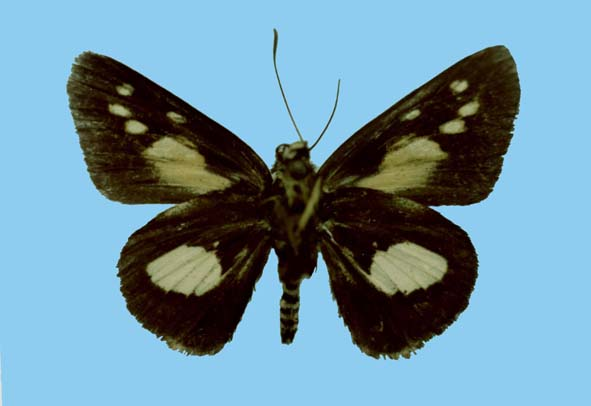
- Male underside

Scientific classification
- Kingdom: Animalia
- Phylum: Arthropoda
- Class: Insecta
- Order: Lepidoptera
- Family: Hesperiidae
- Genus: Pyroneura
- Species: P. toshikoae

Binomial name
- Pyroneura toshikoae H. Hayashi. 1980

= Pyroneura toshikoae =

Species of butterfly

Pyroneura toshikoae is a butterfly of the family Hesperiidae. Its forewing length is 19–20 mm. It is endemic to the Philippines. It is very rare species and found only on eastern part of Mindanao Island.

The specific name is dedicated to Mrs Toshiko HAYASHI, the mother of the author.
