= Pseudosarbia =

Scientific classification
- Kingdom: Animalia
- Phylum: Arthropoda
- Class: Insecta
- Order: Lepidoptera
- Family: Hesperiidae
- Tribe: Erionotini
- Genus: Pseudosarbia; Berg, 1897

Genus of butterflies

Pseudosarbia is a genus of skippers in the family Hesperiidae.
