= Perrotia ismael =

Scientific classification
- Kingdom: Animalia
- Phylum: Arthropoda
- Clade: Pancrustacea
- Class: Insecta
- Order: Lepidoptera
- Family: Hesperiidae
- Genus: Perrotia
- Species: P. ismael

Binomial name
- Perrotia ismael (Oberthür, 1916)

Synonyms
- Trapezites ismael Oberthür, 1916

Species of butterfly

Perrotia ismael is a butterfly in the family Hesperiidae. It is found in eastern Madagascar. The habitat consists of forests.
