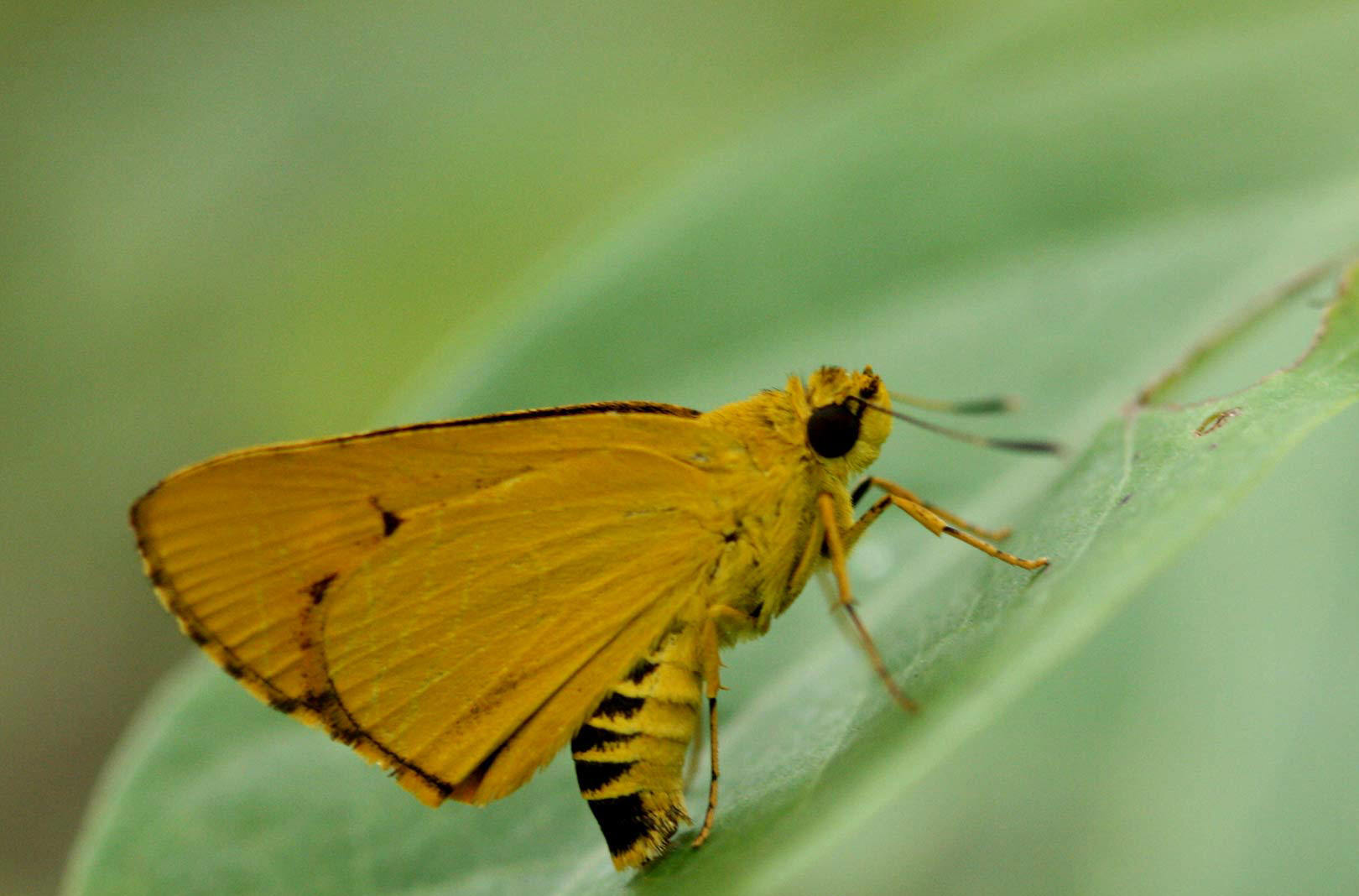

Scientific classification
- Kingdom: Animalia
- Phylum: Arthropoda
- Class: Insecta
- Order: Lepidoptera
- Family: Hesperiidae
- Tribe: Erionotini
- Genus: Cupitha; Moore, 1884
- Species: C. purreea

Binomial name
- Cupitha purreea (Moore, 1877)

Synonyms
- List: Pamphila purreea Moore, 1877; Cypitha purreea; Cupitha tympanifera Moore, 1884; Pamphila verruca Mabille, 1889; Pamphila lycorias Mabille, 1893; Cupitha purreea alara Fruhstorfer, 1911

= Cupitha =

Wax dart

Genus of butterflies

Cupitha is a genus of butterflies in the family Hesperiidae. It is monotypic, being represented by the single species Cupitha purreea, commonly known as the wax dart.

== Distribution ==
Cupitha purreea is found from southern India and Sikkim to Burma, southern Yunnan, the Andamans, Thailand, Laos, Langkawi, Malaysia, Tioman, Borneo, Sumatra, Nias, Java, the Philippines and Sulawesi.

== Description ==
Upperside blackish-brown; cilia yellow, slightly alternated with black; forewing with a gamboge-yellow basal streak, and a median oblique irregular band commencing from near apex, extending to hindmargin and terminating at its base; hindwing with a short median yellow band. Underside sulphur-yellow; forewing with a broad darkbrown basal streak, a small spot at end of cell, and a large patch at posterior angle; hindwing with a brown-speckled streak along inner margin, terminating broadly at anal angle. Body above brown, head and thorax interspersed with yellow hairs; abdomen narrowly banded with yellow; palpi black above, yellow below. Legs and body beneath yellow. Female Larger than the male, with the yellow discal basal throughout in the posterior wings, but only in the interno-median area in the anterior ones, and the yellow portions of the cilia, especially towards the inner and anal angles, darker, inclining to orange. Mr. de Niceville notes that the male has a bare patch at the end of the cell on the upperside of the hindwing on which is placed an oval patch of closely packed scales.

— Edward Yerbury Watson

== Biology ==
Larvae are known to fed on Quisqualis indica, Terminalia paniculata, Terminalia bellirica, Combretum ovalifolium and Ehretia.
