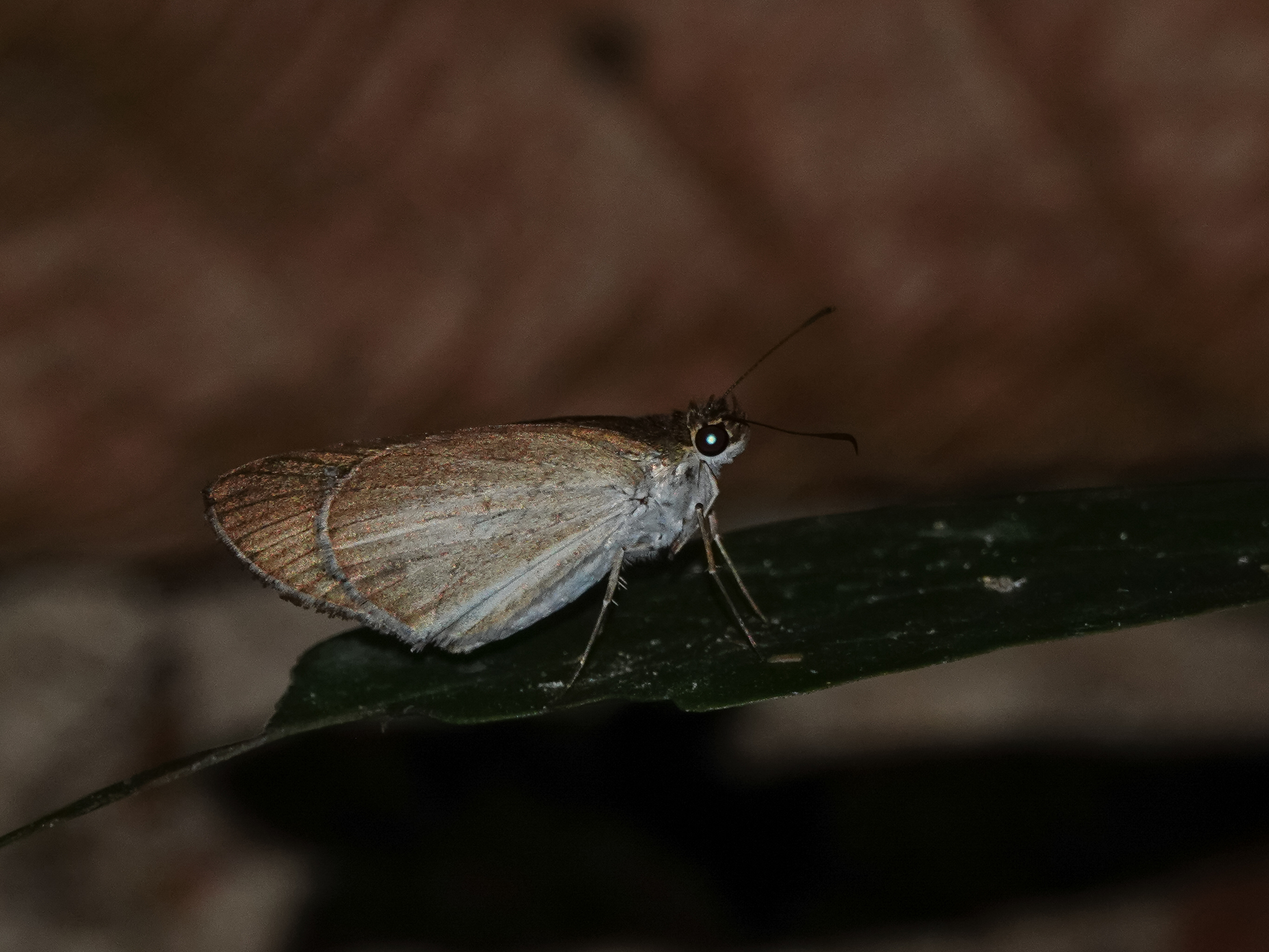

Scientific classification
- Kingdom: Animalia
- Phylum: Arthropoda
- Class: Insecta
- Order: Lepidoptera
- Family: Hesperiidae
- Genus: Suada
- Species: S. swerga

Binomial name
- Suada swerga de Nicéville, 1895

= Suada swerga =

Species of butterfly

Suada swerga, the Grass bob, is a butterfly belonging to the family Hesperiidae.

== Subspecies ==
- S. s. swerga de Niceville, [1884] Sikkim, Vietnam, Burma, Thailand, Laos, Malaysia
- S. s. triplex (Plötz, 1884) Ceylon, Malaya, Java.

== Description ==
Above dark brown, lighter yellowish at the costa and the inner-margin of the basal half in the fore wing and in the whole disc of the hindwing excepting the costal area. White hyaline spots in the disc and before the distal margin of the ore wing. Hindwing beneath whitish yellow with a brown distal margin and a marginal wedge between the median branches.
