= Osphantes =

Scientific classification
- Kingdom: Animalia
- Phylum: Arthropoda
- Class: Insecta
- Order: Lepidoptera
- Family: Hesperiidae
- Tribe: Erionotini
- Genus: Osphantes; Holland, 1896
- Species: O. ogowena

Binomial name
- Osphantes ogowena (Mabille, 1891)

Synonyms
- Plastingia ogowena Mabille, 1891; Osphantes ogawena lulua Evans, 1956

Genus of butterflies

Osphantes is a genus of skippers in the family Hesperiidae. It consists of only one species, Osphantes ogowena, the lobed skipper, which is found in Guinea, Sierra Leone, Ivory Coast, Ghana, Nigeria, Cameroon, Gabon, the Republic of the Congo, the Central African Republic, the Democratic Republic of the Congo and Zambia. The habitat consists of wetter forests.

== Subspecies ==
- Osphantes ogowena ogowena (Guinea, Sierra Leone, Ivory Coast, Ghana, Nigeria, Cameroon, Gabon, Congo, Central African Republic, Democratic Republic of the Congo)
- Osphantes ogowena lulua Evans, 1956 (Democratic Republic of the Congo: Shaba, Zambia)
