= Perrotia malchus =

Scientific classification
- Domain: Eukaryota
- Kingdom: Animalia
- Phylum: Arthropoda
- Class: Insecta
- Order: Lepidoptera
- Family: Hesperiidae
- Genus: Perrotia
- Species: P. malchus

Binomial name
- Perrotia malchus (Mabille, 1879)

Synonyms
- Cyclopides malchus Mabille, 1879; Trapezites apostrophia Oberthür, 1916

Species of butterfly

Perrotia malchus is a butterfly in the family Hesperiidae. It is found in northern and central Madagascar. The habitat consists of forests.
