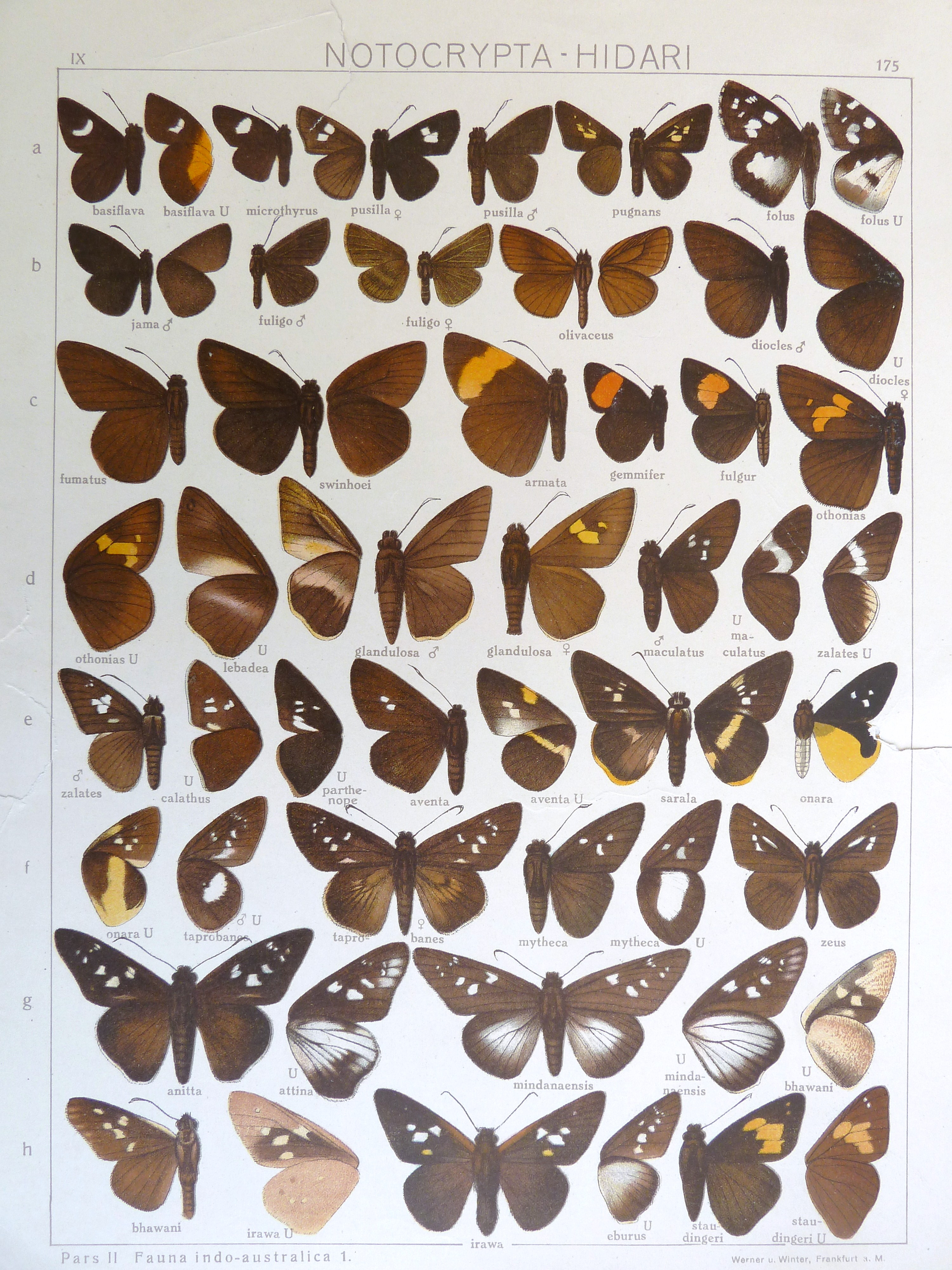
- Pseudokerana fulgur in Seitz

Scientific classification
- Kingdom: Animalia
- Phylum: Arthropoda
- Clade: Pancrustacea
- Class: Insecta
- Order: Lepidoptera
- Family: Hesperiidae
- Subfamily: Hesperiinae
- Tribe: Megathymini
- Genus: Pseudokerana; Eliot in Corbet & Pendlebury, 1978
- Species: P. fulgur

Binomial name
- Pseudokerana fulgur de Nicéville, 1894

= Pseudokerana =

Genus of butterflies

Pseudokerana is an Indomalayan genus of grass skippers in the family Hesperiidae. It is a monotypic genus. The single species is Pseudokerana fulgur (de Nicéville, 1894) found in Thailand, Malaysia, Sumatra and Batoe

Description :the original description reads Habitat: Selesseh, N.-E. Sumatra, "Expanse male, female 1.7" Female. Upperside, both wings dark shining purplish fuscous. Cilia concolorous. Forewing with a broad discal orange fascia, anteriorly not quite reaching the costa, posteriorly ending on the submedian nervure. Hindwing immaculate. Underside, both wings with the ground-colour duller than on the upperside. Forewing with the apex faintly dusted with ochreous scales; the discal orange band more extensive than on the upperside, reaching the inner margin, where it is much paler, the edges of the band more irregular. Hindwing unmarked, except by the following steel-blue spots, which can be seen in all lights, but are more prominent in some lights than in others:—An elongated one closing the discoidal cell, one in the first median interspace about its middle, and three in the submedian interspace at about equal distances apart. Antennae black above, the club beneath ochreous. Palpi black above, beneath chrome-yellow. Eyes encircled by a band of chrome-yellow. Head, thorax, and abdomen above fuscous; abdomen beneath with six ochreous lines.
