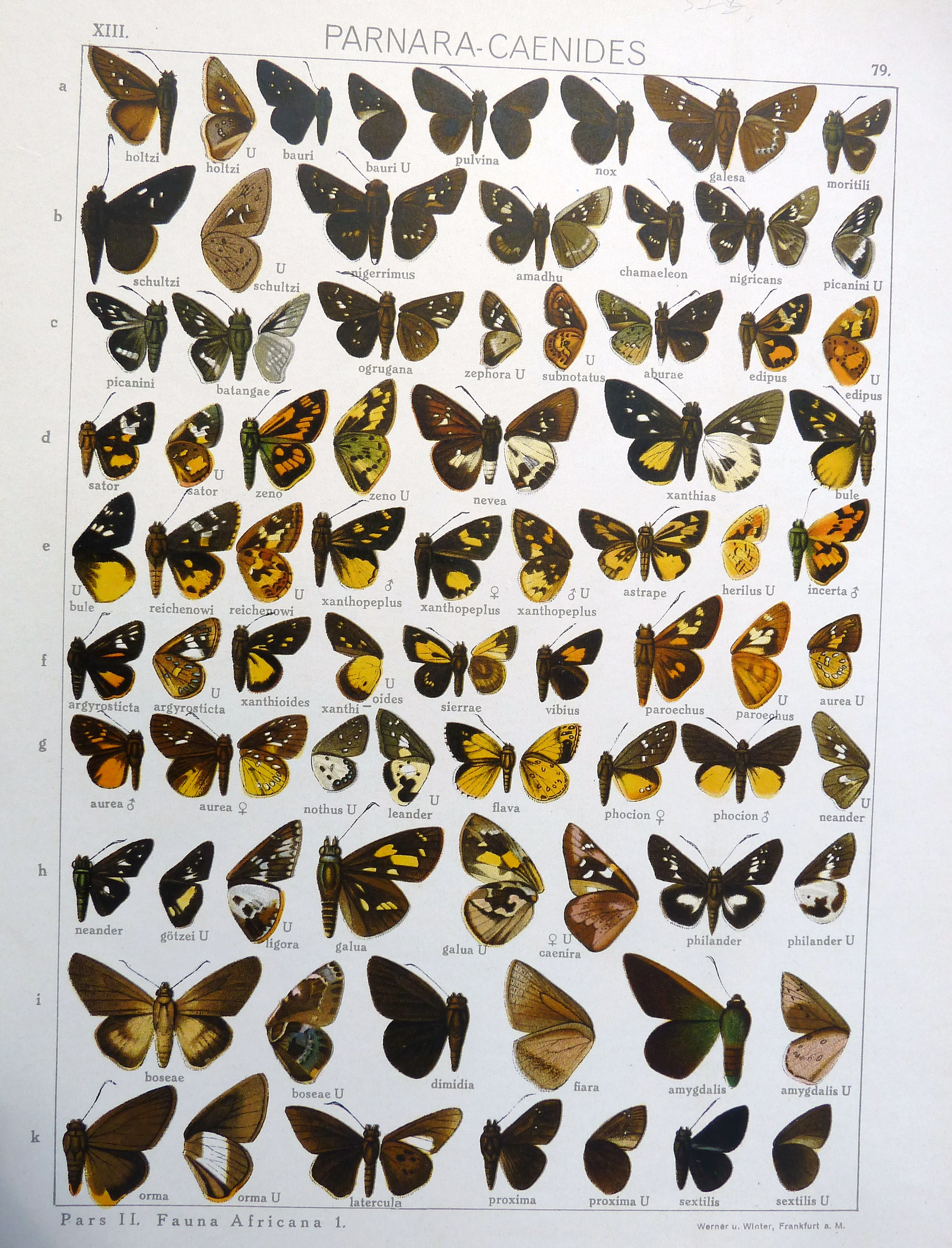

Scientific classification
- Domain: Eukaryota
- Kingdom: Animalia
- Phylum: Arthropoda
- Class: Insecta
- Order: Lepidoptera
- Family: Hesperiidae
- Genus: Perrotia
- Species: P. paroechus

Binomial name
- Perrotia paroechus (Mabille, [1887])

Synonyms
- Trapezites paroechus Mabille, 1887

= Perrotia paroechus =

Species of butterfly

Perrotia paroechus is a butterfly in the family Hesperiidae. It is found in central, eastern and north-eastern Madagascar. The habitat consists of forests.
