= Perrotia kingdoni =

Scientific classification
- Kingdom: Animalia
- Phylum: Arthropoda
- Clade: Pancrustacea
- Class: Insecta
- Order: Lepidoptera
- Family: Hesperiidae
- Genus: Perrotia
- Species: P. kingdoni

Binomial name
- Perrotia kingdoni (Butler, 1879)

Synonyms
- Trapezites kingdoni Butler, 1879; Trapezites perroti Oberthür, 1916

Species of butterfly

Perrotia kingdoni is a butterfly in the family Hesperiidae. It is found in central Madagascar. The habitat consists of forests.
