= Perrotia eximia =

Scientific classification
- Domain: Eukaryota
- Kingdom: Animalia
- Phylum: Arthropoda
- Class: Insecta
- Order: Lepidoptera
- Family: Hesperiidae
- Genus: Perrotia
- Species: P. eximia

Binomial name
- Perrotia eximia (Oberthür, 1923)

Synonyms
- Trapezites eximia Oberthür, 1923

Species of butterfly

Perrotia eximia is a butterfly in the family Hesperiidae. It is found in central Madagascar. Its habitat consists of forests.
