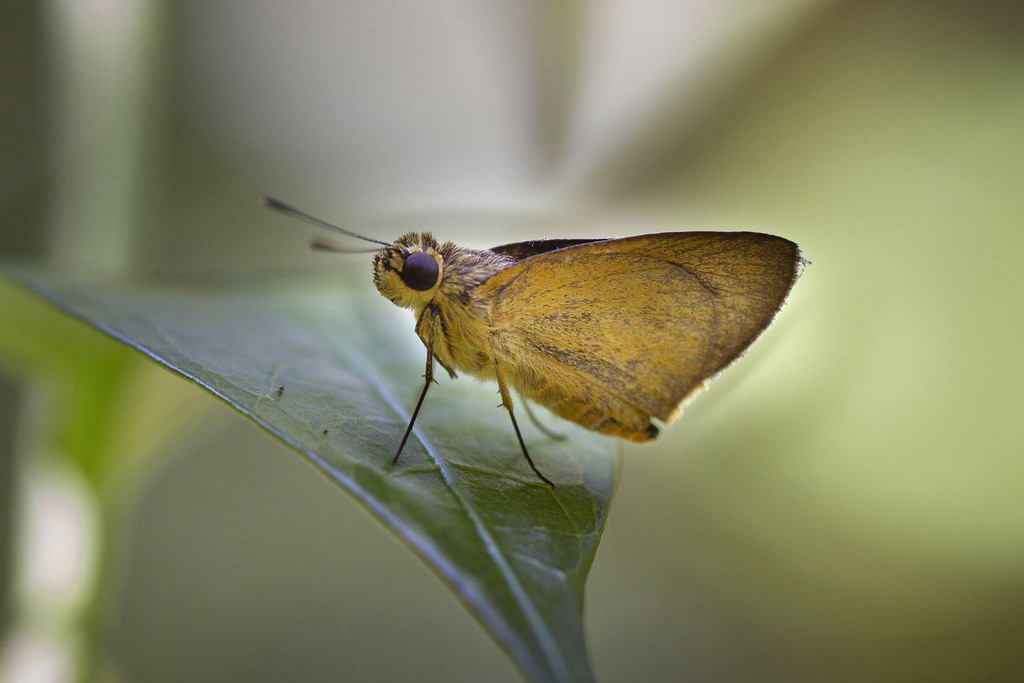

Scientific classification
- Domain: Eukaryota
- Kingdom: Animalia
- Phylum: Arthropoda
- Class: Insecta
- Order: Lepidoptera
- Family: Hesperiidae
- Genus: Perrotia
- Species: P. ochracea

Binomial name
- Perrotia ochracea (Evans, 1937)

Synonyms
- Miraja ochracea Evans, 1937; Trapezites varians f. ochracea Oberthür, 1916; Trapezites varians f. pallida Aurivillius, 1925

= Perrotia ochracea =

Species of butterfly

Perrotia ochracea is a butterfly in the family Hesperiidae. It is found in Madagascar (east and Île Sainte-Marie). The habitat consists of forests.
