= Perrotia silvestralis =

Scientific classification
- Kingdom: Animalia
- Phylum: Arthropoda
- Clade: Pancrustacea
- Class: Insecta
- Order: Lepidoptera
- Family: Hesperiidae
- Genus: Perrotia
- Species: P. silvestralis

Binomial name
- Perrotia silvestralis (Viette, 1956)

Synonyms
- Miraja silvestralis Viette, 1956; Trapezites hova Mabille, 1887

Species of butterfly

Perrotia silvestralis is a butterfly in the family Hesperiidae. It is found in Madagascar (north to the Antankara region). The habitat consists of forests.
