= Perrotia gillias =

Scientific classification
- Domain: Eukaryota
- Kingdom: Animalia
- Phylum: Arthropoda
- Class: Insecta
- Order: Lepidoptera
- Family: Hesperiidae
- Genus: Perrotia
- Species: P. gillias

Binomial name
- Perrotia gillias (Mabille, 1878)

Synonyms
- Pamphila gillias Mabille, 1878; Perrotia gala Evans, 1937; Trapezites epimalchus Oberthür, 1916

Species of butterfly

Perrotia gillias is a butterfly in the family Hesperiidae. It is found in eastern Madagascar (Nosy Be). The habitat consists of forests.
