= Turnerina hazelae =

Scientific classification
- Kingdom: Animalia
- Phylum: Arthropoda
- Clade: Pancrustacea
- Class: Insecta
- Order: Lepidoptera
- Family: Hesperiidae
- Genus: Turnerina
- Species: T. hazelae

Binomial name
- Turnerina hazelae (Stallings & Turner, 1958)

Synonyms
- Megathymus hazelae Stallings & Turner, 1958

Species of butterfly

Turnerina hazelae is a butterfly in the family Hesperiidae, subfamily Hesperiinae, tribe Megathymini. It was originally described by D. B. Stallings and J. R. Turner in 1958 as Megathymus hazelae, and was transferred to the genus Turnerina by H. A. Freeman in 1959. It is known only from its type locality in the Mexican state of Guerrero.

== Distribution ==
Turnerina hazelae is known only from the type locality near Chilpancingo, Guerrero, Mexico, at kilometer 235 of Federal Highway 95.

== Life history ==
Adults emerge during September, October, and November. The larvae feed in a succulent species of Agave growing on rocky cliffs. Collecting the larvae and pupae is difficult, as both die rapidly if the humidity within their larval chamber drops below a certain threshold.
