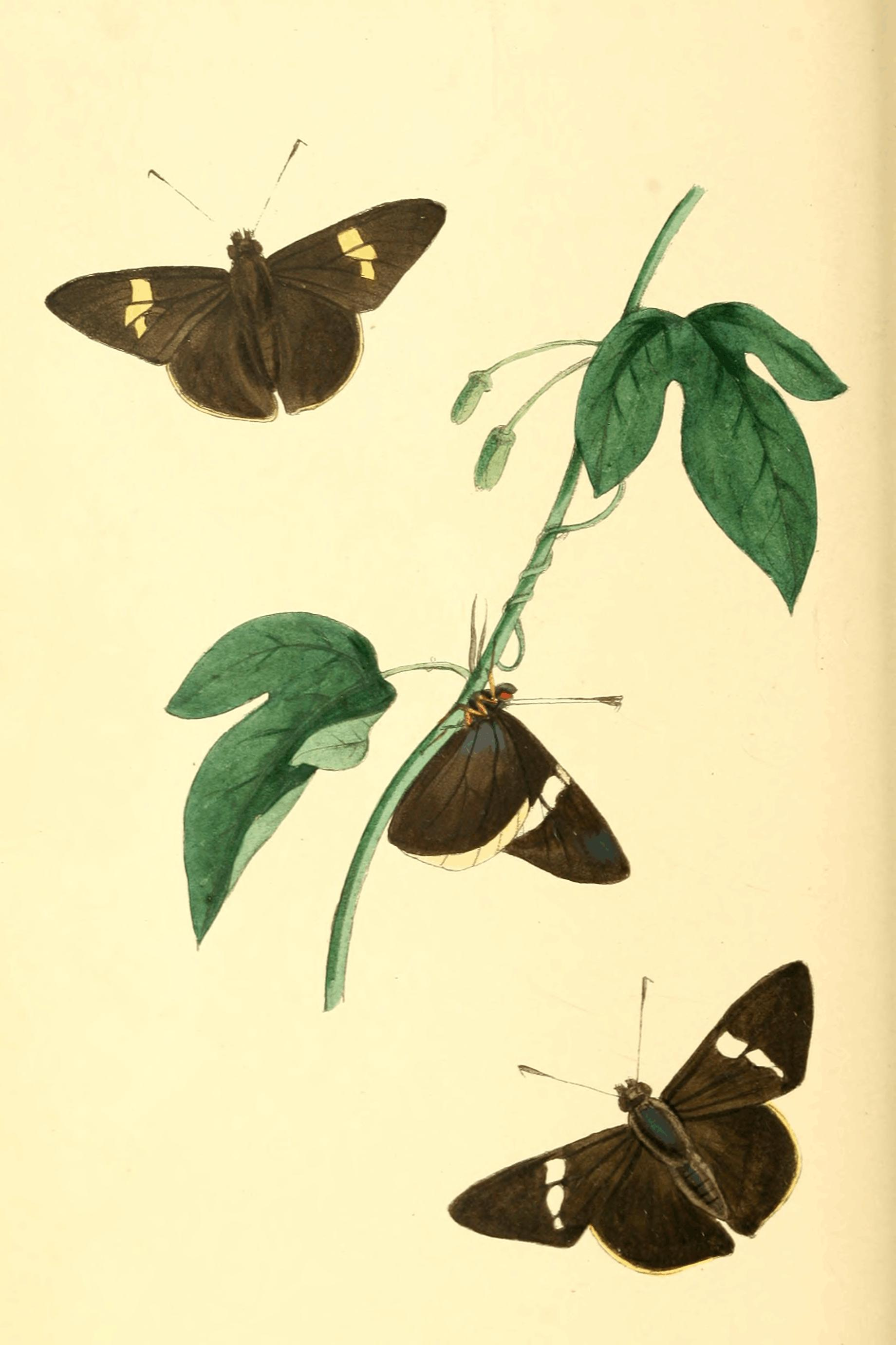

Scientific classification
- Kingdom: Animalia
- Phylum: Arthropoda
- Class: Insecta
- Order: Lepidoptera
- Family: Hesperiidae
- Tribe: Erionotini
- Genus: Orses; Godman, 1901

= Orses =

Genus of butterflies

Orses is a genus of skippers in the family Hesperiidae.
