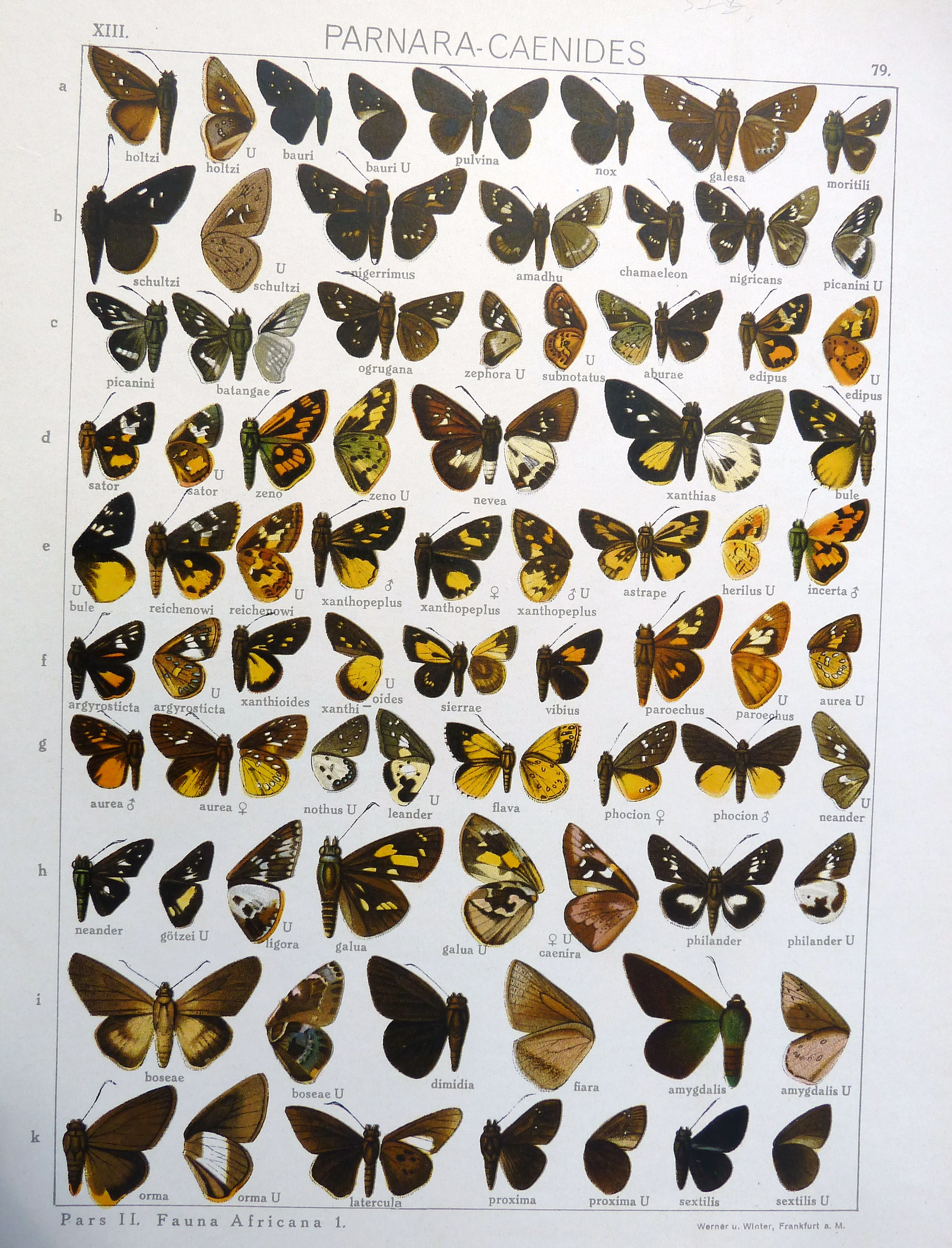
- k

Scientific classification
- Kingdom: Animalia
- Phylum: Arthropoda
- Class: Insecta
- Order: Lepidoptera
- Family: Hesperiidae
- Tribe: Erionotini
- Genus: Mopala; Evans, 1937
- Species: M. orma

Binomial name
- Mopala orma (Plötz, 1879)

Synonyms
- Ismene orma Plötz, 1879; Hesperia violascens Plötz, 1882

= Mopala =

Genus of butterflies

Mopala is a genus of skippers in the family Hesperiidae. It consists of only one species, Mopala orma, the orma, which is found in Guinea, Liberia, Ivory Coast, Ghana, Togo, Nigeria, Cameroon, Gabon, the Republic of the Congo, the Central African Republic, the Democratic Republic of the Congo and Uganda. The habitat consists of wet forests.

Adults have been recorded on the pink flowers of a root parasite growing on a fig tree.
