= Perrotia flora =

Scientific classification
- Domain: Eukaryota
- Kingdom: Animalia
- Phylum: Arthropoda
- Class: Insecta
- Order: Lepidoptera
- Family: Hesperiidae
- Genus: Perrotia
- Species: P. flora

Binomial name
- Perrotia flora (Oberthür, 1923)

Synonyms
- Trapezites flora Oberthür, 1923

Species of butterfly

Perrotia flora is a butterfly in the family Hesperiidae. It is found in northern and eastern Madagascar. The habitat consists of forests.
