= Perrotia sylvia =

Scientific classification
- Domain: Eukaryota
- Kingdom: Animalia
- Phylum: Arthropoda
- Class: Insecta
- Order: Lepidoptera
- Family: Hesperiidae
- Genus: Perrotia
- Species: P. sylvia

Binomial name
- Perrotia sylvia (Evans, 1937)

Synonyms
- Miraja sylvia Evans, 1937; Miraja sida Evans, 1937; Perrotia sida

Species of butterfly

Perrotia sylvia is a butterfly in the family Hesperiidae. It is found in northern and eastern Madagascar. The habitat consists of forests.
