= Perrotia varians =

Scientific classification
- Domain: Eukaryota
- Kingdom: Animalia
- Phylum: Arthropoda
- Class: Insecta
- Order: Lepidoptera
- Family: Hesperiidae
- Genus: Perrotia
- Species: P. varians

Binomial name
- Perrotia varians (Oberthür, 1916)

Synonyms
- Trapezites varians Oberthür, 1916; Trapezites varians f. brunnea Oberthür, 1916

Species of butterfly

Perrotia varians is a butterfly in the family Hesperiidae. It is found in eastern Madagascar. The habitat consists of forests.
