= Perrotia albiplaga =

Scientific classification
- Domain: Eukaryota
- Kingdom: Animalia
- Phylum: Arthropoda
- Class: Insecta
- Order: Lepidoptera
- Family: Hesperiidae
- Genus: Perrotia
- Species: P. albiplaga

Binomial name
- Perrotia albiplaga Oberthür, 1916

Synonyms
- Perrotia albimacula Oberthür, 1916; Perrotia teresina Oberthür, 1923

Species of butterfly

Perrotia albiplaga is a butterfly in the family Hesperiidae. It is found in northern and eastern Madagascar.
