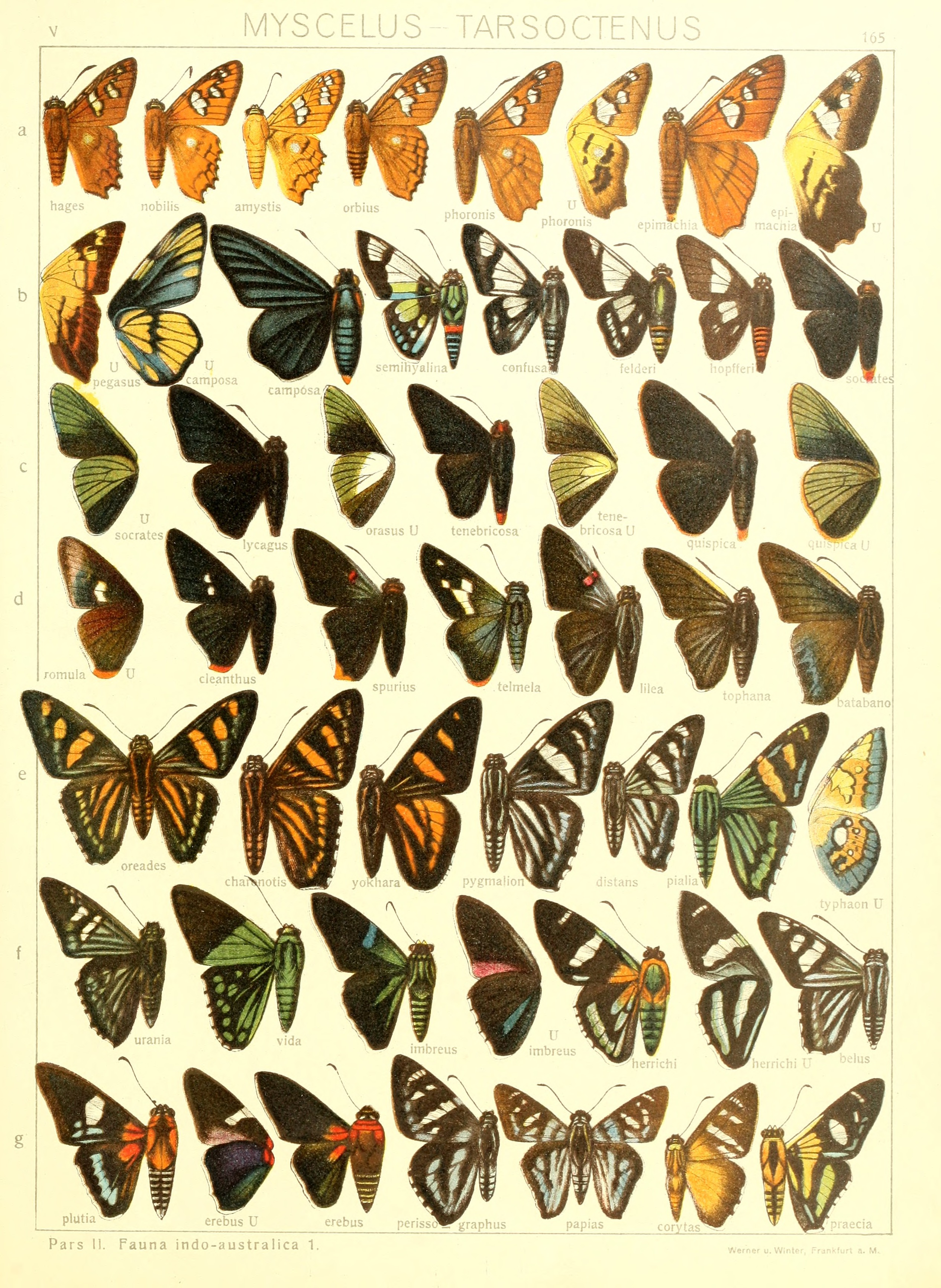
- Pyrrhopygopsis and related genera depicted in Adalbert Seitz's Macrolepidoptera of the World

Scientific classification
- Kingdom: Animalia
- Phylum: Arthropoda
- Class: Insecta
- Order: Lepidoptera
- Family: Hesperiidae
- Genus: Pyrrhopygopsis; Godman & Salvin, 1901

Species
- (see text)

= Pyrrhopygopsis =

Genus of butterflies

Pyrrhopygopsis is a Neotropical genus of grass skippers in the family Hesperiidae.

== Species ==
According to the Interim Register of Marine and Nonmarine Genera, Pyrrhopygopsis includes the following species:

- Pyrrhopygopsis agaricon Druce, 1908
- Pyrrhopygopsis aviola Mabille, 1903
- Pyrrhopygopsis caminus Druce, 1908
- Pyrrhopygopsis crates Mabille & Boullet, 1912
- Pyrrhopygopsis fulvicrus Mabille & Boullet, 1912
- Pyrrhopygopsis igniculus Druce, 1908
- Pyrrhopygopsis lugubris Druce, 1908
- Pyrrhopygopsis lycagus Draudt, 1924
- Pyrrhopygopsis migonei Jorgensen, 1935
- Pyrrhopygopsis nanta Evans, 1955
- Pyrrhopygopsis orasus Druce, 1876
- Pyrrhopygopsis quispica Plötz, 1886
- Pyrrhopygopsis reedi Weeks, 1901
- Pyrrhopygopsis romula Druce, 1875
- Pyrrhopygopsis rubripalpis Riley, 1925
- Pyrrhopygopsis socrates Ménétriés, 1885
- Pyrrhopygopsis subvirescens Schaus, 1902
- Pyrrhopygopsis tenebricosa Hewitson, 1876
- Pyrrhopygopsis xanthothrix Mabille, 1891
