= Ploetzia =

Scientific classification
- Kingdom: Animalia
- Phylum: Arthropoda
- Class: Insecta
- Order: Lepidoptera
- Family: Hesperiidae
- Tribe: Erionotini
- Genus: Ploetzia; Saalmüller, 1884
- Species: P. amygdalis

Binomial name
- Ploetzia amygdalis (Mabille, 1877)

Synonyms
- Genus: Systole Mabille, 1885; Species: Hesperia amygdalis Mabille, 1877; Proteides madagascariensis Staudinger; Mabille, 1887

Genus of butterflies

Ploetzia is a genus of butterflies in the family Hesperiidae. It consists of only one species, Ploetzia amygdalis, which is found in northern and north-eastern Madagascar. The habitat consists of forests and anthropogenic environments.

The larvae feed on the leaves of coconut palms of the family Arecaceae.
