= Lycas =

Scientific classification
- Kingdom: Animalia
- Phylum: Arthropoda
- Class: Insecta
- Order: Lepidoptera
- Family: Hesperiidae
- Tribe: Erionotini
- Genus: Lycas; Godman, 1901

Genus of butterflies

Lycas is a genus of skippers in the family Hesperiidae.
