= Perrotia howa =

Scientific classification
- Domain: Eukaryota
- Kingdom: Animalia
- Phylum: Arthropoda
- Class: Insecta
- Order: Lepidoptera
- Family: Hesperiidae
- Genus: Perrotia
- Species: P. howa

Binomial name
- Perrotia howa (Mabille, 1876)

Synonyms
- Cyclopides howa Mabille, 1876

Species of butterfly

Perrotia howa is a butterfly in the family Hesperiidae. It is found in Madagascar (central, east and Nosy Be). The habitat consists of forests.
