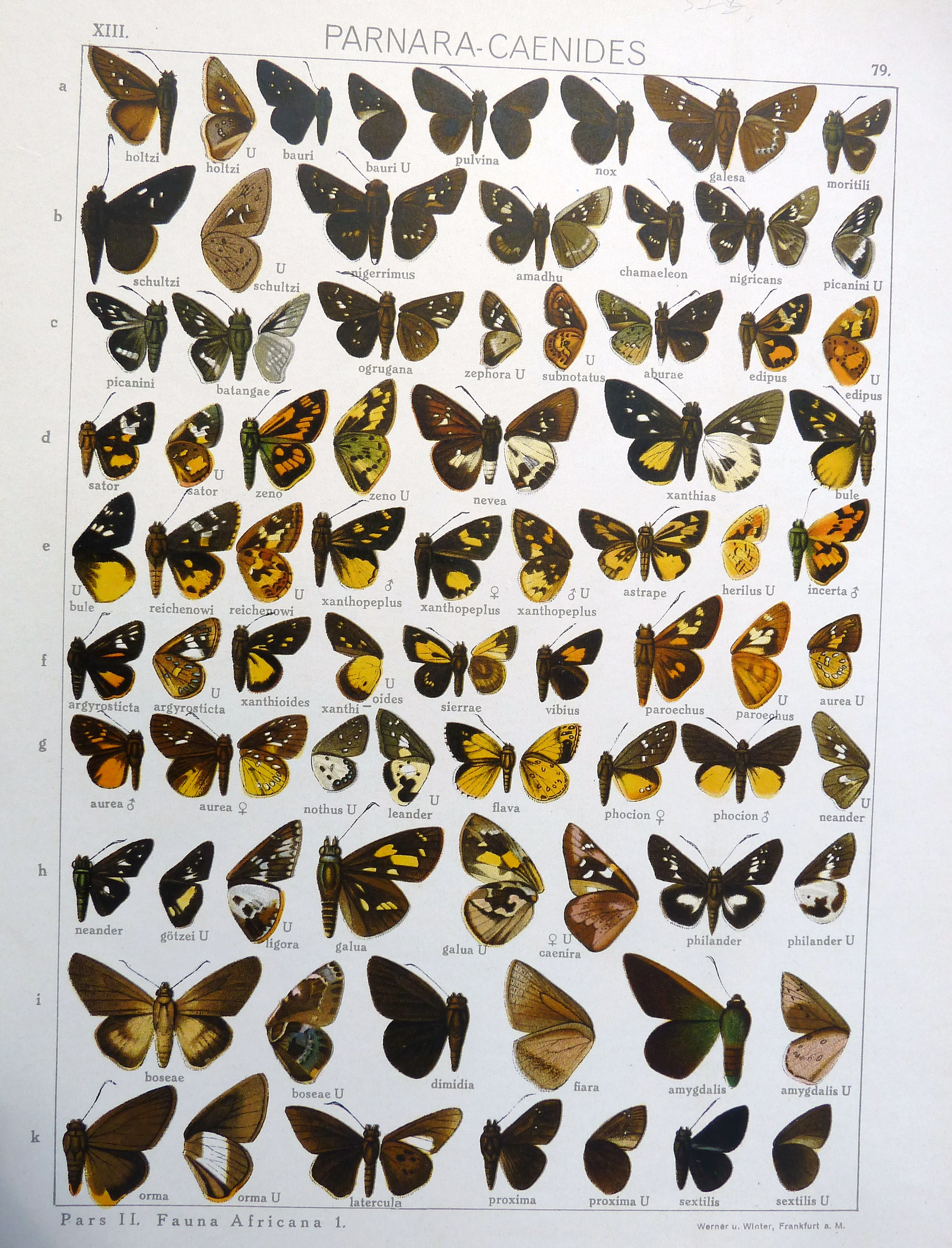
- c

Scientific classification
- Kingdom: Animalia
- Phylum: Arthropoda
- Class: Insecta
- Order: Lepidoptera
- Family: Hesperiidae
- Tribe: Erionotini
- Genus: Gyrogra; Lindsey & Miller, 1965
- Species: G. subnotata

Binomial name
- Gyrogra subnotata (Holland, 1894)

Synonyms
- Parnara subnotata Holland, 1894; Pamphila rufipuncta Mabille; Holland, 1896

= Gyrogra =

Genus of butterflies

Gyrogra is a genus of skippers in the family Hesperiidae. It contains only one species, Gyrogra subnotata, the odd leaf sitter, which is found in Guinea, Sierra Leone, Ivory Coast, Ghana, Nigeria, Cameroon, Gabon, the Republic of the Congo and the Democratic Republic of the Congo. The habitat consists of forests.
