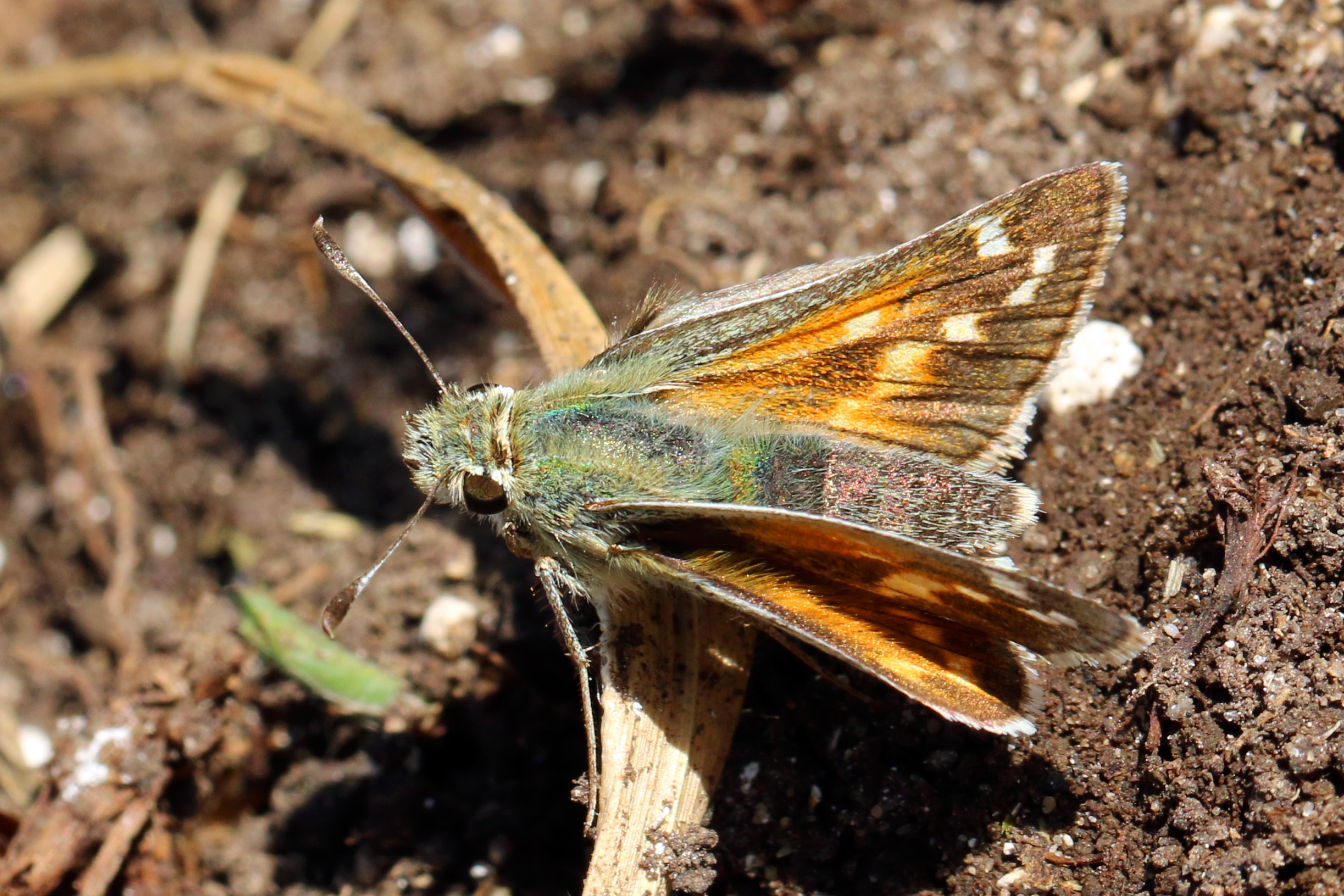

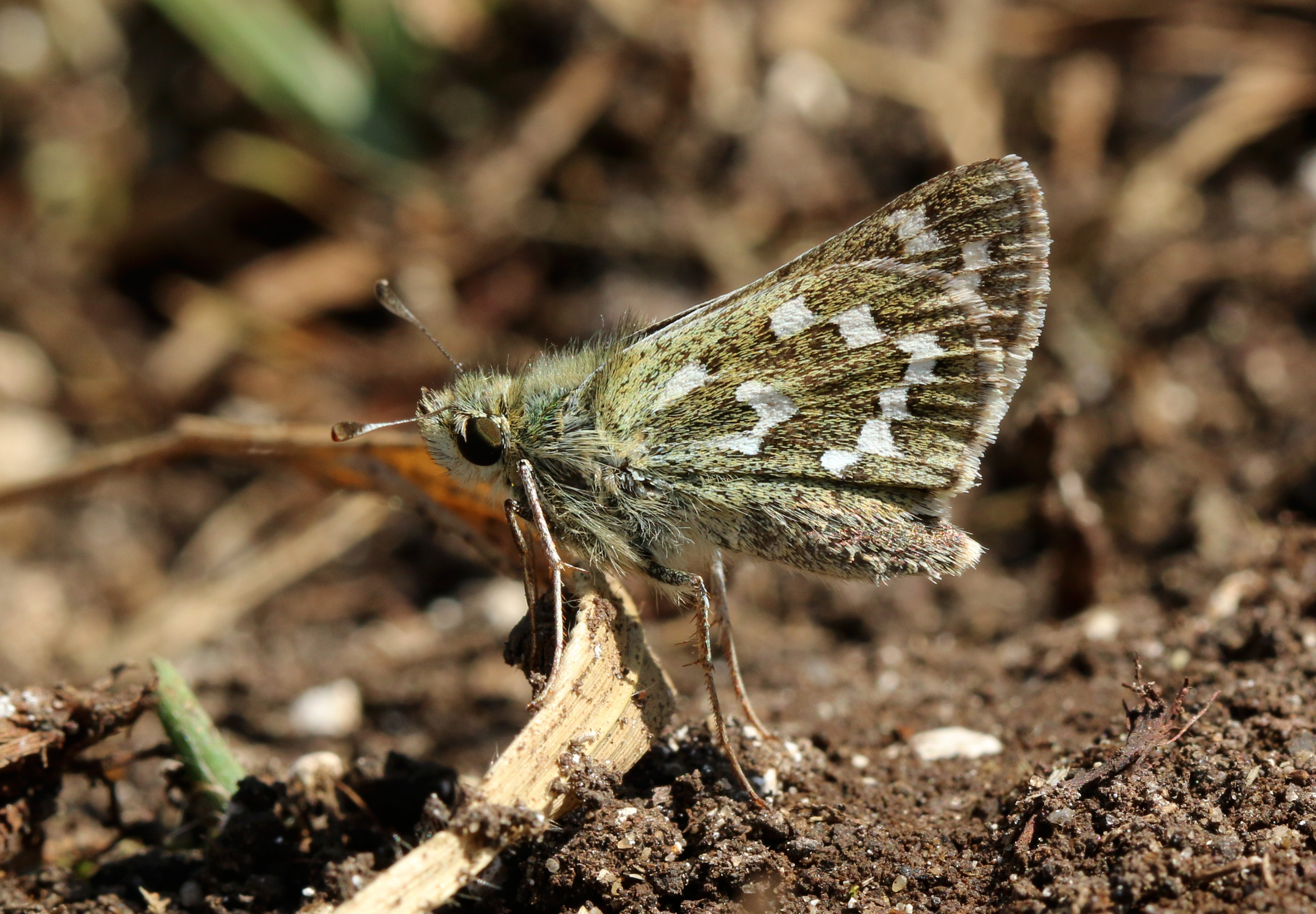
- both Hesperia comma Oxfordshire

Scientific classification
- Kingdom: Animalia
- Phylum: Arthropoda
- Class: Insecta
- Order: Lepidoptera
- Family: Hesperiidae
- Subfamily: Hesperiinae; Latreille, 1809

Tribes
- Aeromachini; Astictopterini; Baorini; Ceratrichiini; Erionotini; Gretnini; Hesperiini; Eetionini; Ismini; Megathymini; Pericharini; Psolosini; Taractrocerini

= Grass skipper =

Subfamily of butterflies

Grass skippers or banded skippers are butterflies of the subfamily Hesperiinae, part of the skipper family, Hesperiidae. The subfamily was established by Pierre André Latreille in 1809.

== Description and distribution ==
With over 2,000 described species, this is the largest skipper butterfly subfamily and occurs worldwide except in New Zealand. About 50 percent of grass skippers live in the Neotropics. 137 species are native to North America. Around 38 species are native to Australia. Genera Ochlodes and Hesperia exist exclusively in the Holarctic.

They are usually orange, rust, or brown in colour and have pointed forewings. Many species have dark markings or black stigmas on their forewings. Most members of this subfamily have an oval antenna club with an apiculus on the tip, although Carterocephalus and Piruna do not. The antennae generally has a sharp bend.

Hesperiinae larvae feed on many different types of grasses and sedges and palms, though some species are limited.

Adults typically visit flowers and hold their wings together while feeding. Hesperiinae are unique in that they hold their wings partially open while resting, with the forewings and hindwings held at different angles. This is known as the "jet-plane position". Most male grass skippers perch to await females.

Adults are strong fliers; they move quickly and usually in a linear direction. Some of the species, however, do flutter and these species patrol for females rather than perch.

== Conservation ==
The following grass skippers are considered at risk.

Species	Status	Location
Silver spotted skipper	Rare, Protected (UK)	Europe
Lulworth skipper	Protected (UK)	Europe
Orange grass-dart skipper	Rare	Australia
White-banded grass-dart skipper	Rare	Australia
Arogos skipper	Endangered (USA states IL, NJ, NY), Threatened (USA state MN), Species of Concern (USA state IA)	North America
Loammi skipper	G2 Imperiled (Global), S2 Imperiled, Species of Greatest Conservation Need (USA state FL)	North America
Byssus skipper	Endangered (USA Federal listing)	North America
Carson wandering skipper	Endangered (USA Federal listing)	North America
Dukes' skipper	Threatened (US state (MI)	North America
Dakota skipper	Threatened (Canada), Endangered (Canada province MB), Federal Candidate (USA), Vulnerable (ICUN)	North America
Mardon skipper	Endangered (USA state WA & Federal Candidate USA)	North America
Otto skipper	Endangered (Canada), Threatened (Canada province MB), Threatened (USA states (IL, MI, MN)	North America
Pawnee montane skipper	Threatened (USA Federal listing)	North America
Poweshiek skipperling	Threatened (Canada), Endangered (USA state WI), Threatened (USA state IA, MI), Species of Concern (USA state MN)	North America
Rare skipper	Endangered (US state DE)	North America
Wandering skipper	Threatened (Mexico, USA)	North America
