= R. gracilis =

R. gracilis may refer to:

- Reithrodontomys gracilis, the slender harvest mouse, a rodent species
- Rhacheosaurus gracilis, an extinct marine crocodyliform species from the Late Jurassic of Germany
- Rhapis gracilis, the slender bamboo palm, a multi-stemmed palm tree species native to southern China
- Rhogeessa gracilis, the slender yellow bat, a vesper bat species found only in Mexico
- Rhombonotus gracilis, a jumping spider species known from Queensland, Australia

== Synonym ==
- Rana gracilis, a synonym for Fejervarya pulla, a frog species

== See also ==
- Gracilis (disambiguation)
