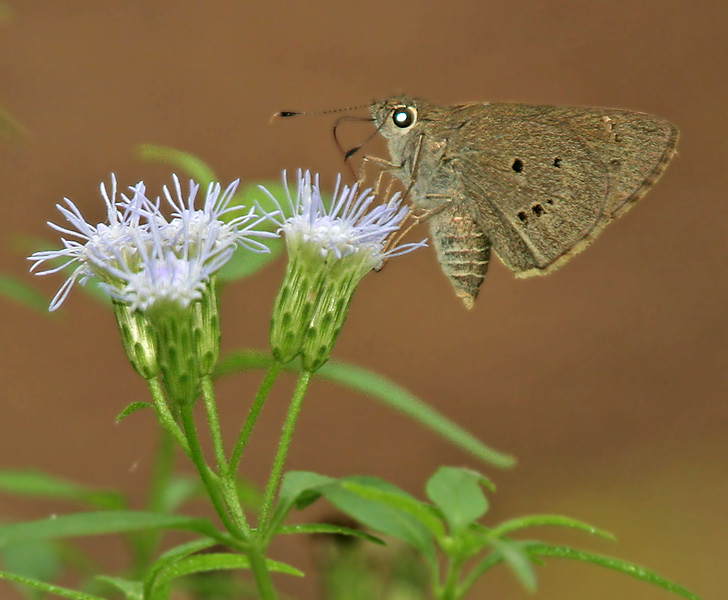
- Indian palm bob (Suastus gremius) on Chromolaena odorata in Hyderabad, India.

Scientific classification
- Kingdom: Animalia
- Phylum: Arthropoda
- Clade: Pancrustacea
- Class: Insecta
- Order: Lepidoptera
- Family: Hesperiidae
- Tribe: Megathymini
- Genus: Suastus; Moore, [1881]

= Suastus =

Genus of butterflies

Suastus, whose members are called palm bobs, is a genus of grass skipper butterflies in the family Hesperiidae.

== Species ==
- Suastus gremius (Fabricius, 1798) South India, Northwest Himalayas to Burma, Thailand, Laos, Vietnam, Hainan, Hong Kong, Formosa, Langkawi, Malaya, Sri Lanka, Sumba, Indian palm bob
- Suastus minuta (Moore, 1877) South India, Sikkim to Burma, Sri Lanka, Thailand, Laos, Hainan, Vietnam and Malaya, Small palm bob
- Suastus everyx (Mabille, 1883) Burma, Thailand, Malaya, Borneo, Sumatra, Java, Bali, White palm bob
- Suastus migreus (Semper, 1892) Philippines

== Biology ==
The larvae feed on Palmae including Arenga, Borassus, Caryota, Chamaerops, Cocos, Licuala, Phoenix, Rhapis, Trachycarpus, Calamus
