= Stallingsia maculosus =

Scientific classification
- Kingdom: Animalia
- Phylum: Arthropoda
- Class: Insecta
- Order: Lepidoptera
- Family: Hesperiidae
- Genus: Stallingsia
- Species: S. maculosus

Binomial name
- Stallingsia maculosus (H. Freeman, 1955)

Synonyms
- Megathymus maculosus H. Freeman, 1955

Species of butterfly

Stallingsia maculosus, the manfreda giant skipper, is a species of giant skipper in the butterfly family Hesperiidae. It is found in Central America and North America.

The MONA or Hodges number for Stallingsia maculosus is 4152.
