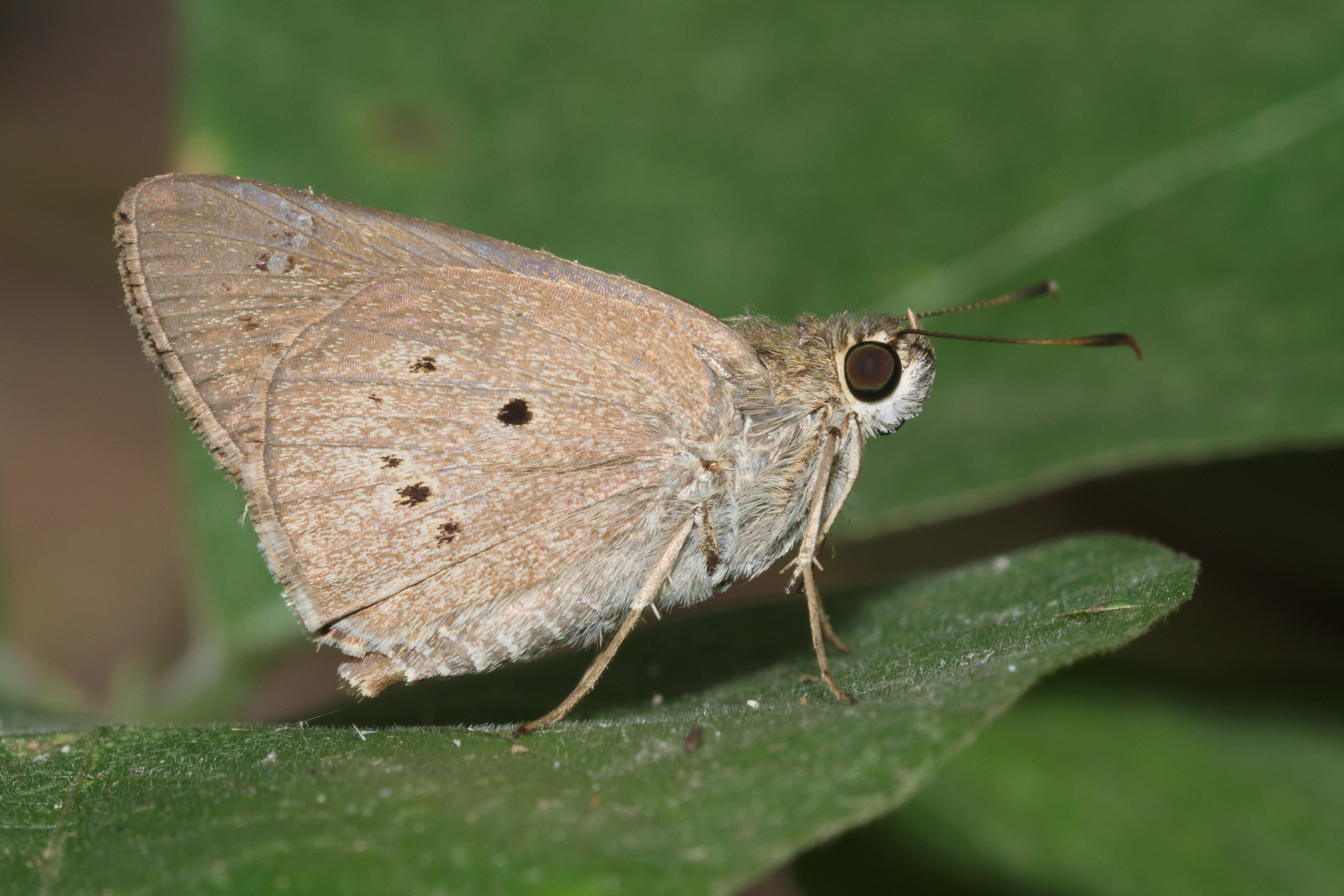
- In Kerala, India
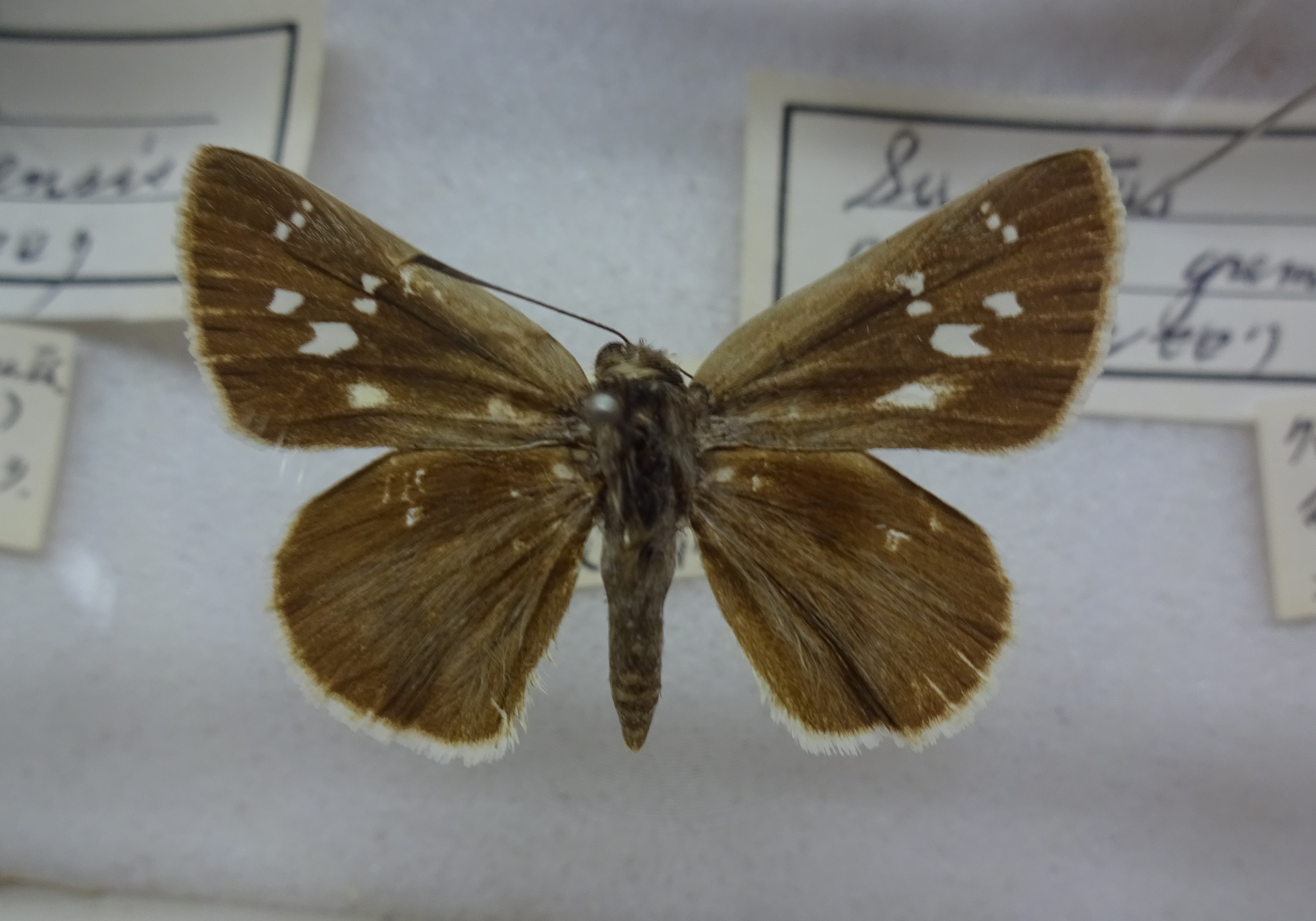

Scientific classification
- Kingdom: Animalia
- Phylum: Arthropoda
- Clade: Pancrustacea
- Class: Insecta
- Order: Lepidoptera
- Family: Hesperiidae
- Genus: Suastus
- Species: S. gremius

Binomial name
- Suastus gremius (Fabricius, 1798)

= Suastus gremius =

Indian palm bob

Species of butterfly

Suastus gremius, the Indian palm bob or palm bob, is a species of butterfly in the family Hesperiidae. It is found in the Indomalayan realm.

== Description ==
Male. Upperside olive-brown. Forewing with ochreous-white spots, a small one in the middle of the discocellulars, sometimes a minute one above it, three sub-apical small spots, the upper one usually minute, three discal larger spots in an oblique line, the upper one before the middle of the first median interspace, the second (somewhat oval) before the middle of the first median interspace, the third (a long oval) a little beyond the middle of the interno-median interspace; these discal spots varying much in size. Hindwing paler than the forewing, with a broad dark costal margin, lint without any markings. Cilia of both wings brownish-ochreous. Underside grey tinged with pinkish. Forewing with the inner portion below the subcostal vein suffused with black, leaving the apex broadly pinkish-grey, the spots as on the upperside. Hindwing clear pinkish-grey without any suffusion, but sparsely covered with whitish scales, a black spot near the upper end of the cell, and three in an oblique row in the median and interno-median interspaces, all ringed with whitish. Antennae black, tip of club orange, underside of club and shaft whitish; head and body brown above, grey beneath, legs grey, tarsi orange. Female usually paler than the male, markings similar, \mi the spots on the forewing are all larger, the two upper discal spots square, the middle spot excavated on its outer side, two conjoined large spots at the cell end; the female is generally (but not always) somewhat larger than the male.

— Charles Swinhoe, Lepidoptera Indica. Vol. X

== Subspecies ==
- S. g. gremius South India, Northwest Himalayas to Burma, Thailand, Laos, Vietnam, Hainan, Hong Kong, Formosa, Langkawi, Malaya
- S. g. chilon Doherty, 1891 Sumba
- S. g. subgrisea (Moore, 1878) Sri Lanka

== Biology ==
The larva feeds on species of Phoenix, Rhapis, Caryota and Washingtonia

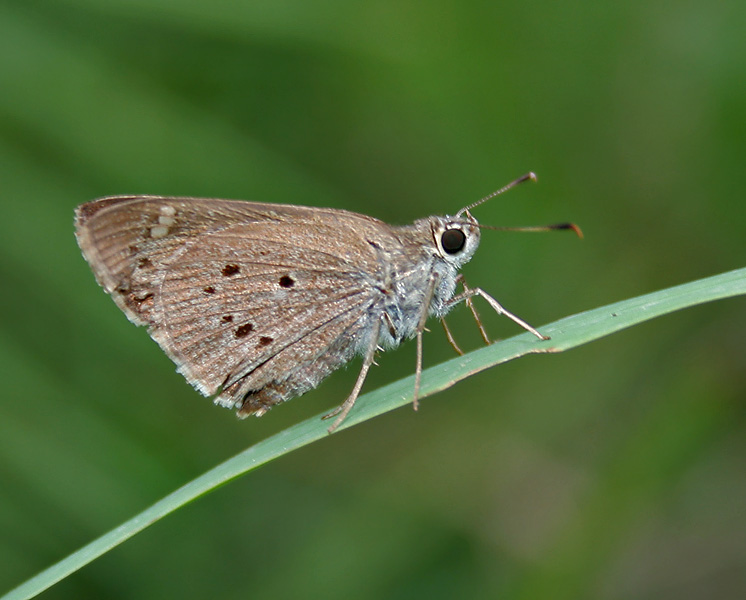

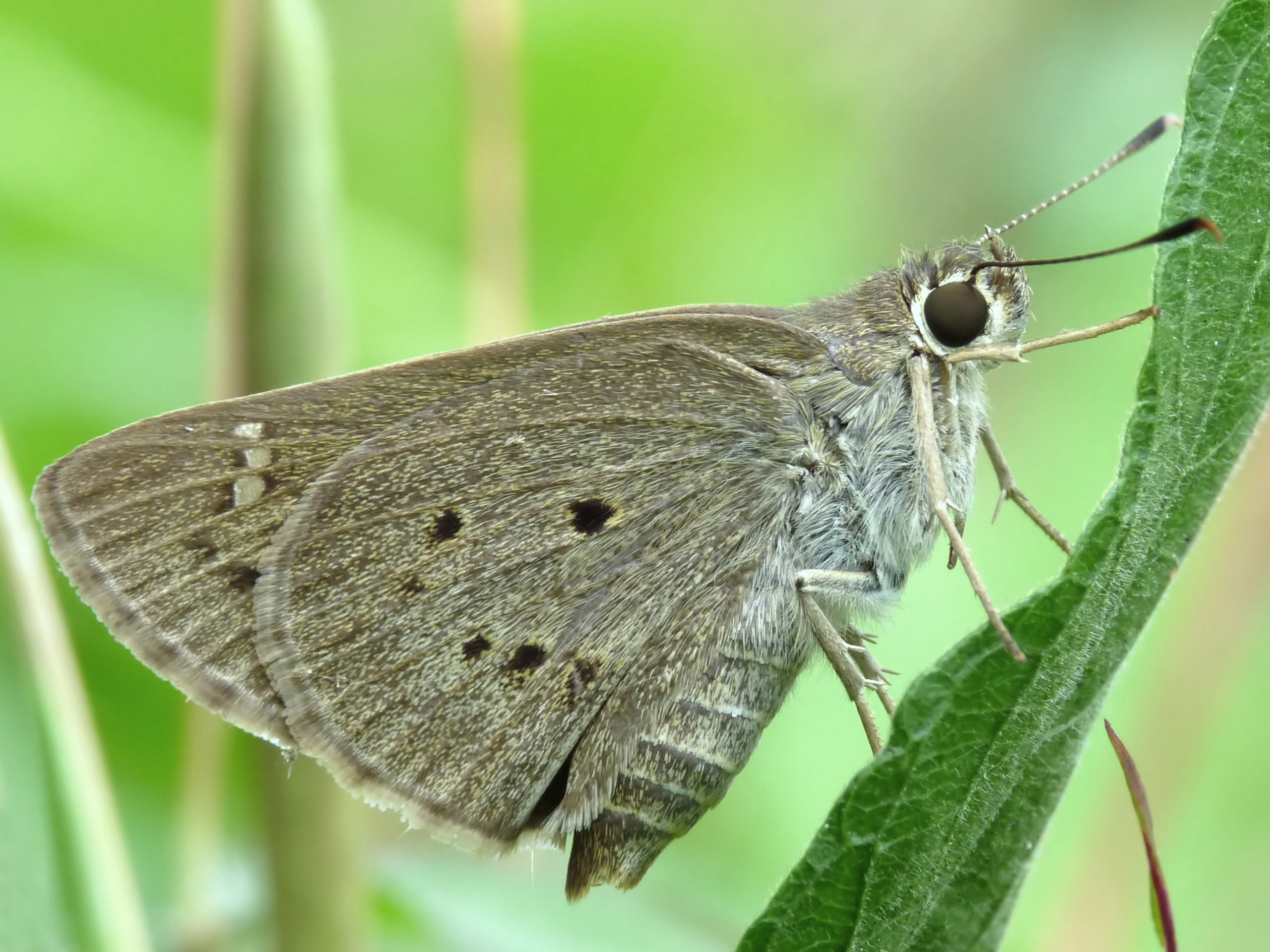

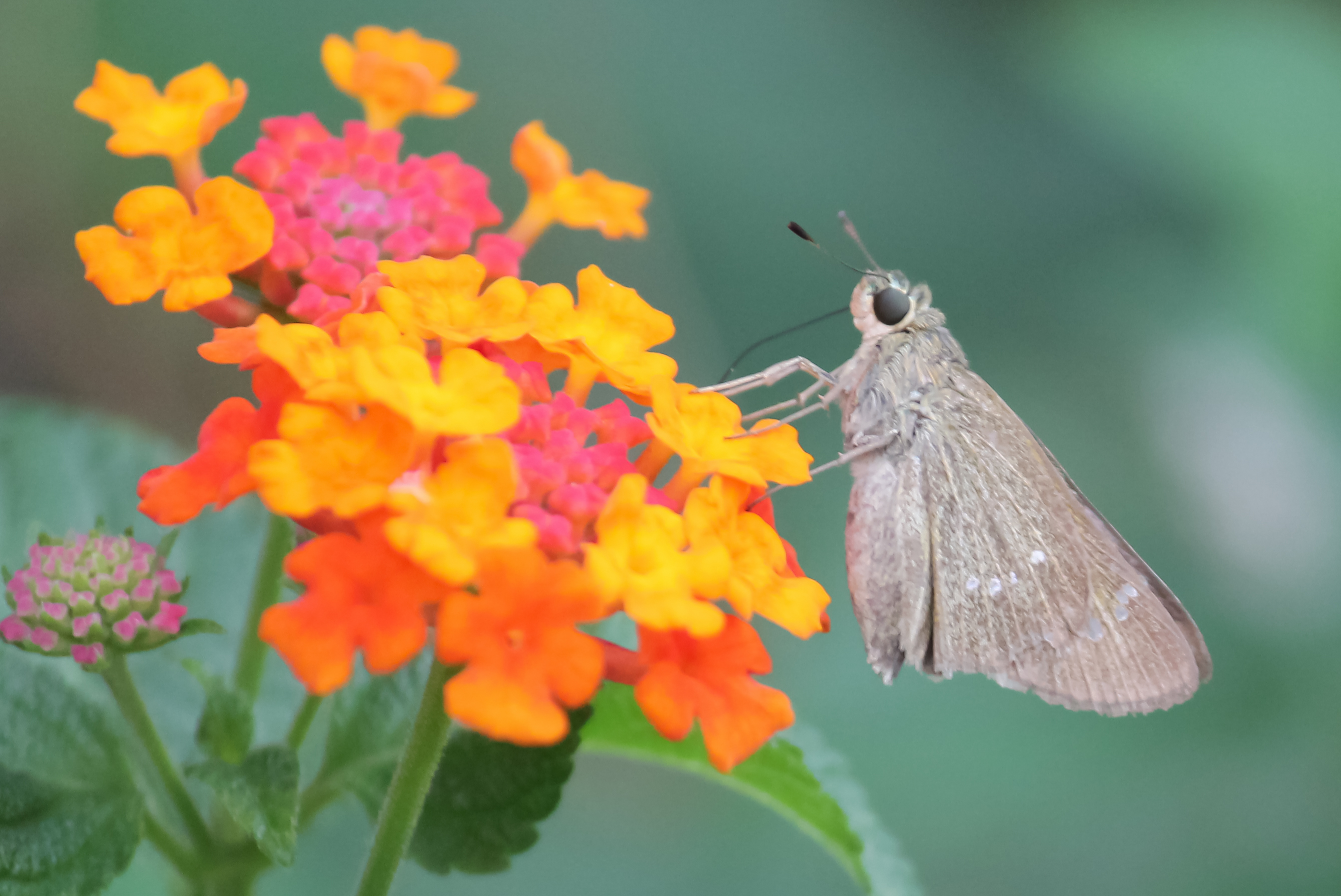

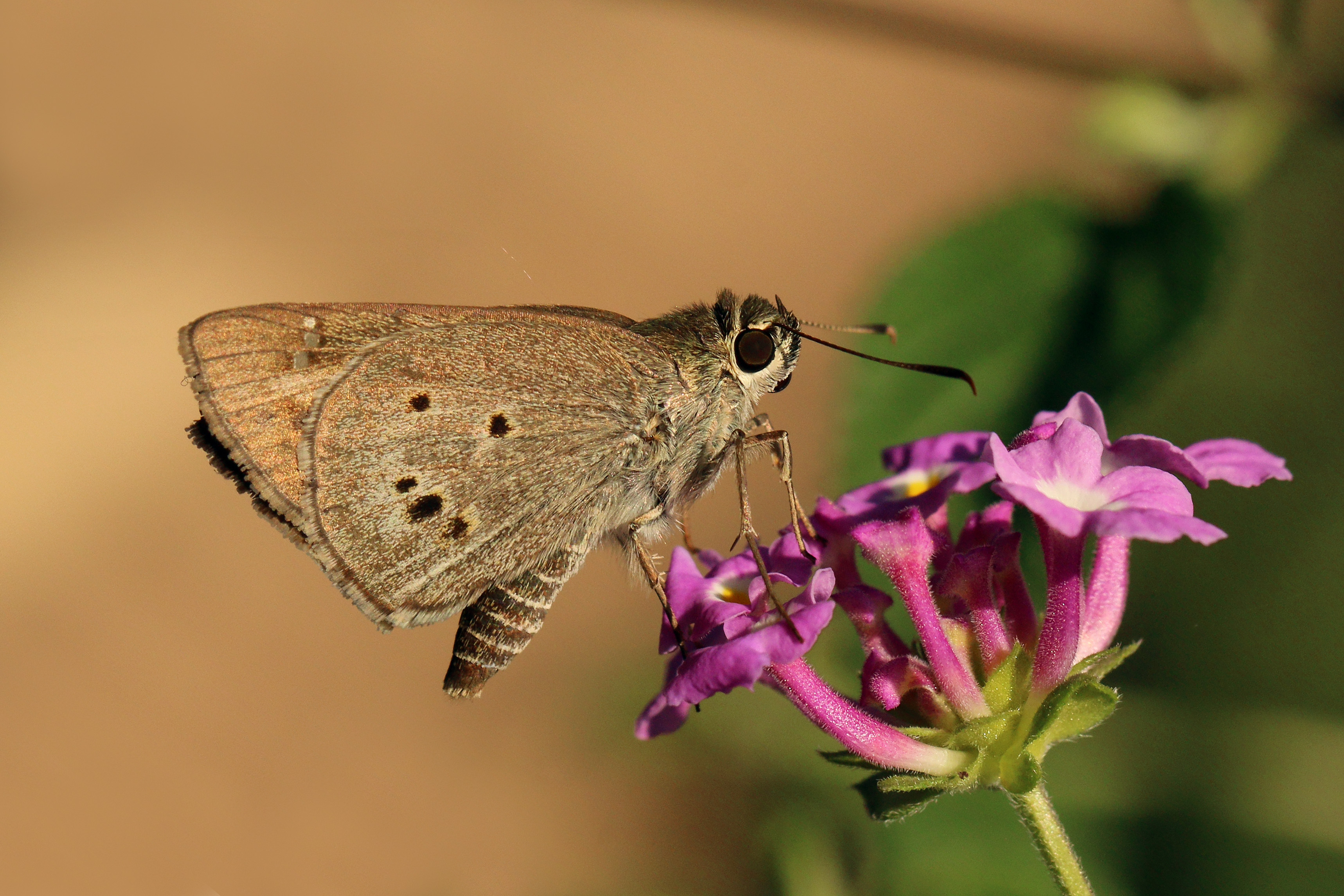
On Bali, Indonesia
