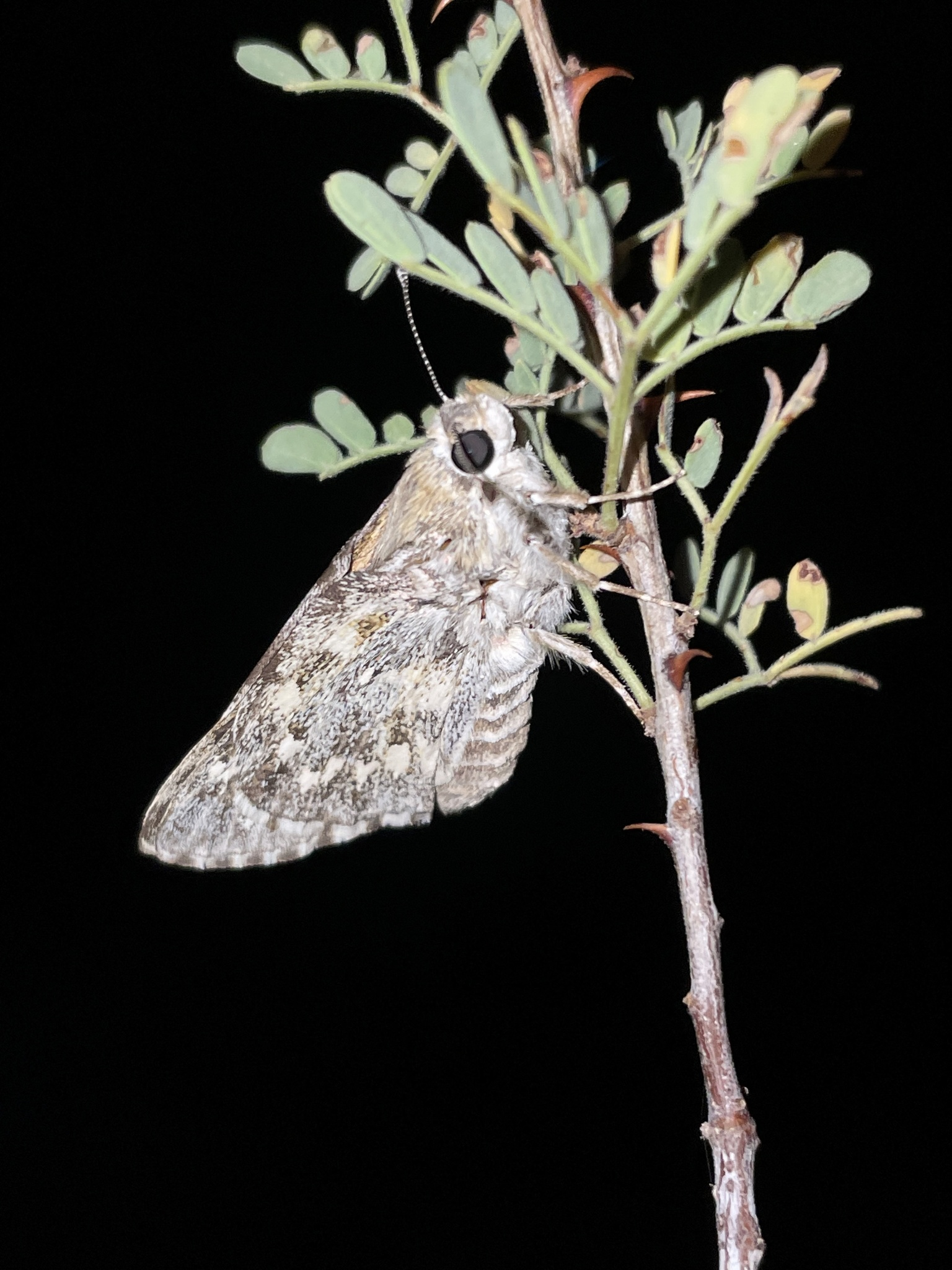
- Adult California Giant-Skipper

Scientific classification
- Kingdom: Animalia
- Phylum: Arthropoda
- Class: Insecta
- Order: Lepidoptera
- Family: Hesperiidae
- Genus: Agathymus
- Species: A. stephensi

Binomial name
- Agathymus stephensi (Skinner, 1912)

= Agathymus stephensi =

Species of butterfly

Agathymus stephensi, the California giant skipper, is a species of giant skipper in the butterfly family Hesperiidae. It is found in Central America and North America.

The MONA or Hodges number for Agathymus stephensi is 4142.
