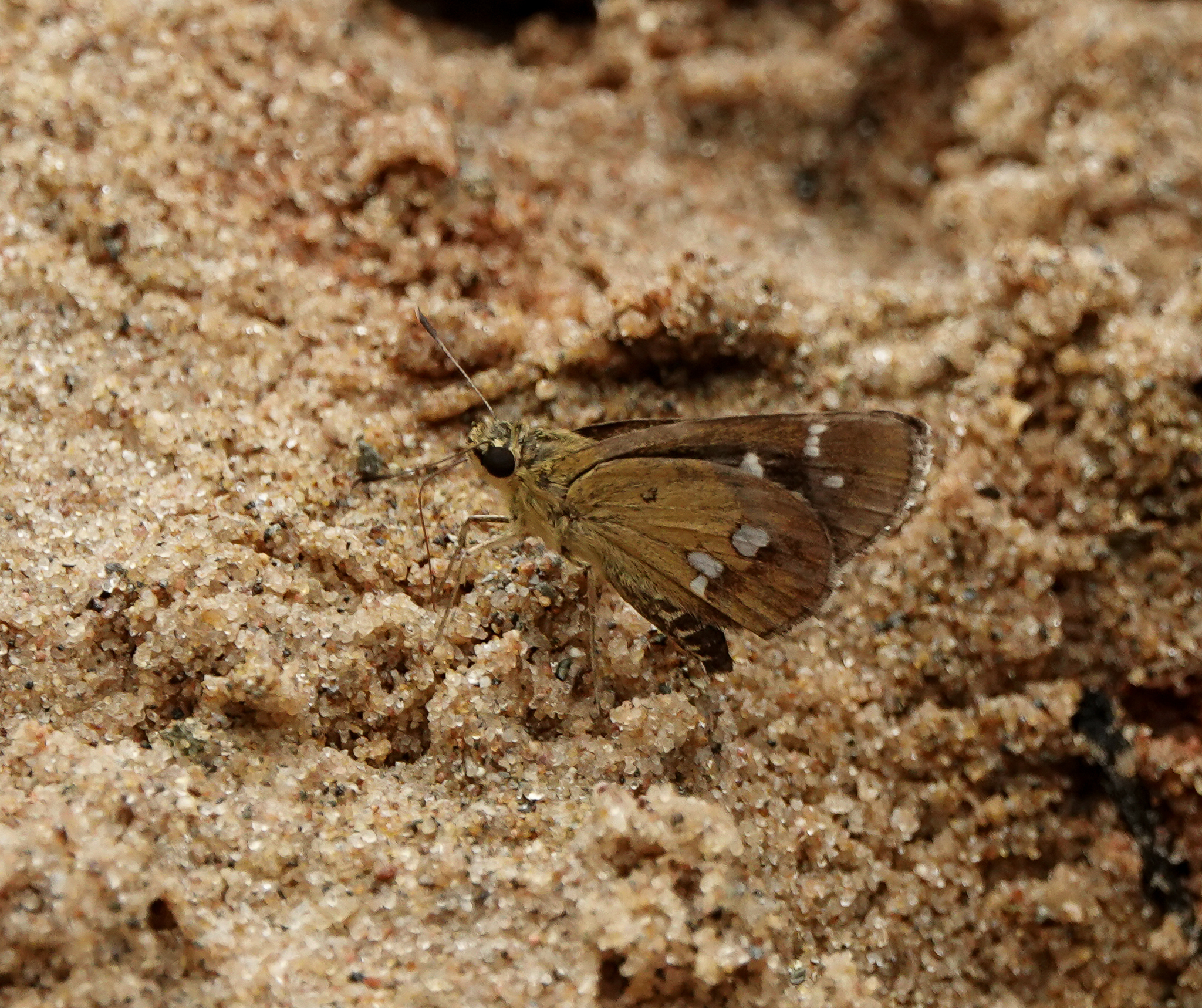
- Underside
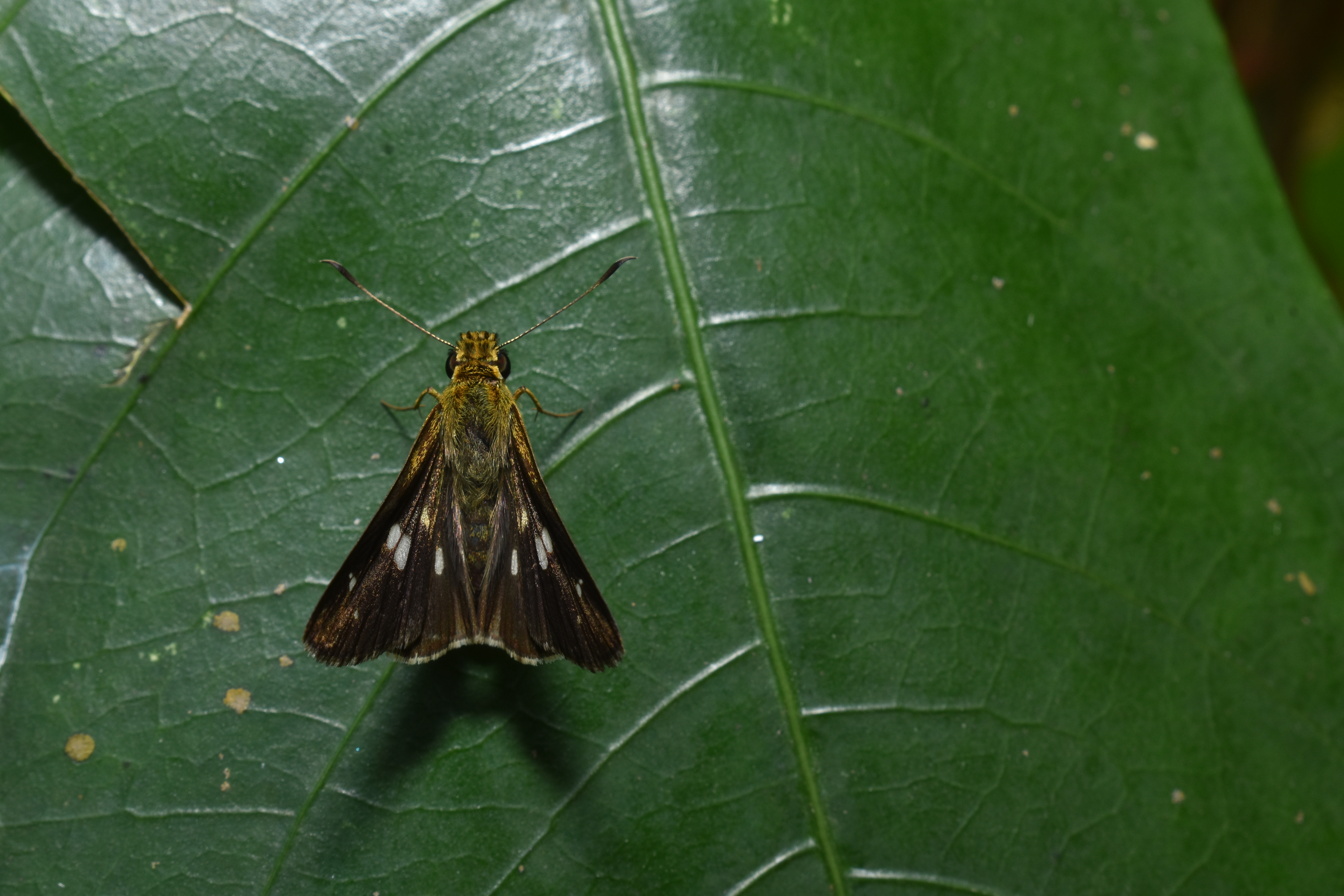
- Upperside

Scientific classification
- Kingdom: Animalia
- Phylum: Arthropoda
- Clade: Pancrustacea
- Class: Insecta
- Order: Lepidoptera
- Family: Hesperiidae
- Subfamily: Hesperiinae
- Tribe: Megathymini
- Genus: Scobura
- Species: S. cephala

Binomial name
- Scobura cephala (Hewitson, 1876)

Synonyms
- Hesperia cephala

= Scobura cephala =

Species of butterfly

Scobura cephala, also known as the forest bob or the extra forest bob, is a butterfly in the family Hesperiidae. It was described by William Chapman Hewitson in 1876. It is found in North-east India and Myanmar. It is a monotypic species.

== Description ==
The upperside is dark-brown, the upperside forewing has three transparent spots and an opaque spot near the inner margin, while the upperside hindwing has two transparent spots near the middle.

The underside is also dark-brown, and is very similar to the upperside, except that the costal margin from the base to the transparent spot is yellow. The wingspan of this species is 1.35 inches (3.42 cm).

The type locality of this species is Darjeeling.
