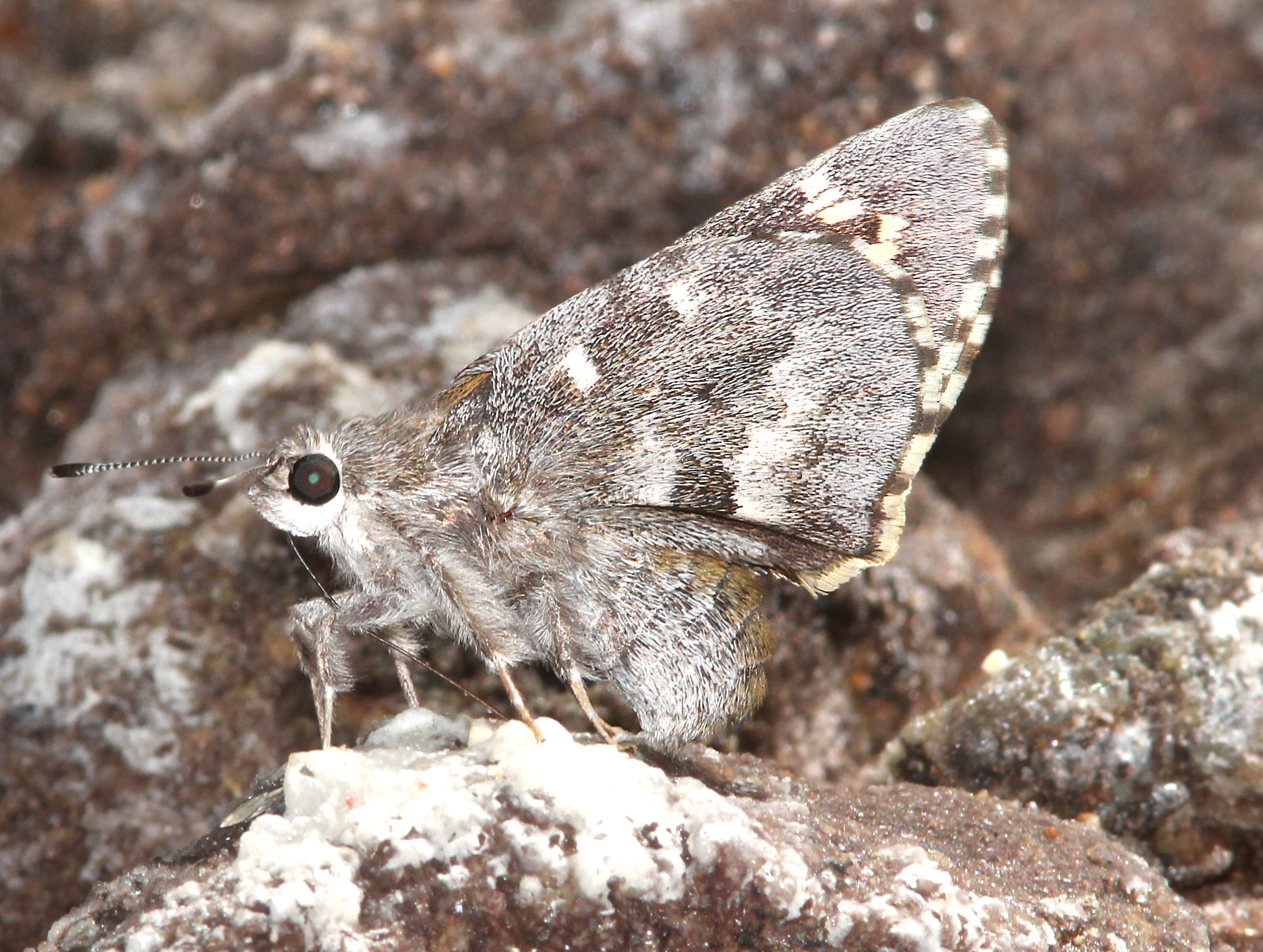
- Agathymus aryxna

Scientific classification
- Kingdom: Animalia
- Phylum: Arthropoda
- Clade: Pancrustacea
- Class: Insecta
- Order: Lepidoptera
- Family: Hesperiidae
- Genus: Agathymus; Freeman, 1959

= Agathymus =

Genus of butterflies

Agathymus is a genus of butterflies in the skipper family, Hesperiidae. They occur in the North American deserts. The genus was described by Hugh Avery Freeman in 1959. The larvae bore into the stems of agave plants.

These butterflies have been treated as members of the disputed skipper subfamily Megathyminae, but are also considered sufficiently distinct to be in their own family, Megathymidae, along with the genera Megathymus and Stallingsia.

== Species ==
The following species and subspecies are recognized:

- Agathymus indecisa (A. Butler & H. Druce, 1872) – Guatemalan giant-skipper – Chiapas to Costa Rica
- Agathymus escalantei D. Stallings, J. Turner & V. Stallings, 1966 – Escalante's giant-skipper – Guerrero
- Agathymus rethon (Dyar, 1913) – Black giant-skipper – Mexico (COL, GRO, JAL, MICH, MOR, NAY, OAX, PUE, VER), El Salvador
- Agathymus tehuacanus J. García & A. Turrent, 2020
- Agathymus gentryi Roever, 1998 – Gentry's giant-skipper – SW Arizona, E San Bernardino Co., California
- Agathymus baueri (D. Stallings & J. Turner, 1954) – Bauer's giant-skipper
  - Agathymus baueri freemani D. Stallings & J. Turner, 1960 – W-C Arizona
  - Agathymus baueri baueri (D. Stallings & J. Turner, 1954) – C Arizona
- Agathymus aryxna (Dyar, 1905) – Arizona giant-skipper – SE Arizona, SW New Mexico, NE Sonora
- Agathymus evansi (H. Freeman, 1950) – Huachuca giant-skipper – Huachuca Mountains, Arizona
- Agathymus belli (H. Freeman, 1955) – Bell's giant-skipper – Chihuahua, Durango
- Agathymus ricei D. Stallings, J. Turner & V. Stallings, 1966 – Rice's giant-skipper – Puebla
- Agathymus polingi (Skinner, 1905) – Poling's giant-skipper – S Arizona, SW New Mexico, NE Sonora
- Agathymus neumoegeni (W. H. Edwards, 1882) – Neumoegen's giant-skipper
  - Agathymus neumoegeni neumoegeni (W. H. Edwards, 1882) – Arizona to western New Mexico
  - Agathymus neumoegeni carlsbadensis (D. Stallings & J. Turner, 1957) – Guadalupe Mountains, NM & TX
  - Agathymus neumoegeni judithae (D. Stallings & J. Turner, 1957) – Hudspeth Co., Texas
  - Agathymus neumoegeni diabloensis H. Freeman, 1962 – Hudspeth Co., Texas
  - Agathymus neumoegeni florenceae (D. Stallings & J. Turner, 1957) – Davis Mountains, Texas
  - Agathymus neumoegeni mcalpinei (H. Freeman, 1955) – Brewster Co., Texas
- Agathymus chisosensis (H. Freeman, 1952) – Chisos Mountains, Texas
- Agathymus juliae (D. Stallings & J. Turner, 1958) – Julia's giant-skipper – Durango
- Agathymus hoffmanni (H. Freeman, 1952) – Hoffmann's giant-skipper – Central Mexico
- Agathymus alliae (D. Stallings & J. Turner, 1957) – Mojave giant-skipper
  - Agathymus alliae alliae (D. Stallings & J. Turner, 1957) – Arizona
  - Agathymus alliae paiute Roever, 1998 – SE California, Nevada, Utah, NW Arizona
- Agathymus fieldi H. Freeman, 1960 – Field's giant-skipper – Western Mexico
- Agathymus stephensi (Skinner, 1912) – California giant-skipper – Southern California, Baja California
- Agathymus comstocki (Harbison, 1957) – Comstock's giant-skipper – Baja California
- Agathymus dawsoni Harbison, 1963 – Dawson's giant-skipper – Baja California
- Agathymus mariae (W. Barnes & Benjamin, 1924) – Mary's giant-skipper
  - Agathymus mariae mariae (W. Barnes & Benjamin, 1924) – New Mexico and Texas
  - Agathymus mariae chinatiensis H. Freeman, 1964 – Presidio Co., Texas
  - Agathymus mariae lajitaensis H. Freeman, 1964 – Presidio Co., Texas
  - Agathymus mariae rindgei H. Freeman, 1964 – Val Verde & Kinney Cos., Texas
- Agathymus gilberti H. Freeman, 1964 – Gilbert's giant-skipper – Texas
- Agathymus micheneri D. Stallings, J. Turner & V. Stallings, 1961 – Michener's giant-skipper – Coahuila
- Agathymus galeana Grishin, 2023 – Nuevo León
- Agathymus remingtoni (D. Stallings & J. Turner, 1958) – Remington's giant-skipper – Eastern Mexico
- Agathymus estelleae (D. Stallings & J. Turner, 1958) – Estelle's giant-skipper
  - Agathymus estelleae valverdiensis H. Freeman, 1966 – South-central Texas
  - Agathymus estelleae estelleae (D. Stallings & J. Turner, 1958) – Coahuila & Nuevo León
