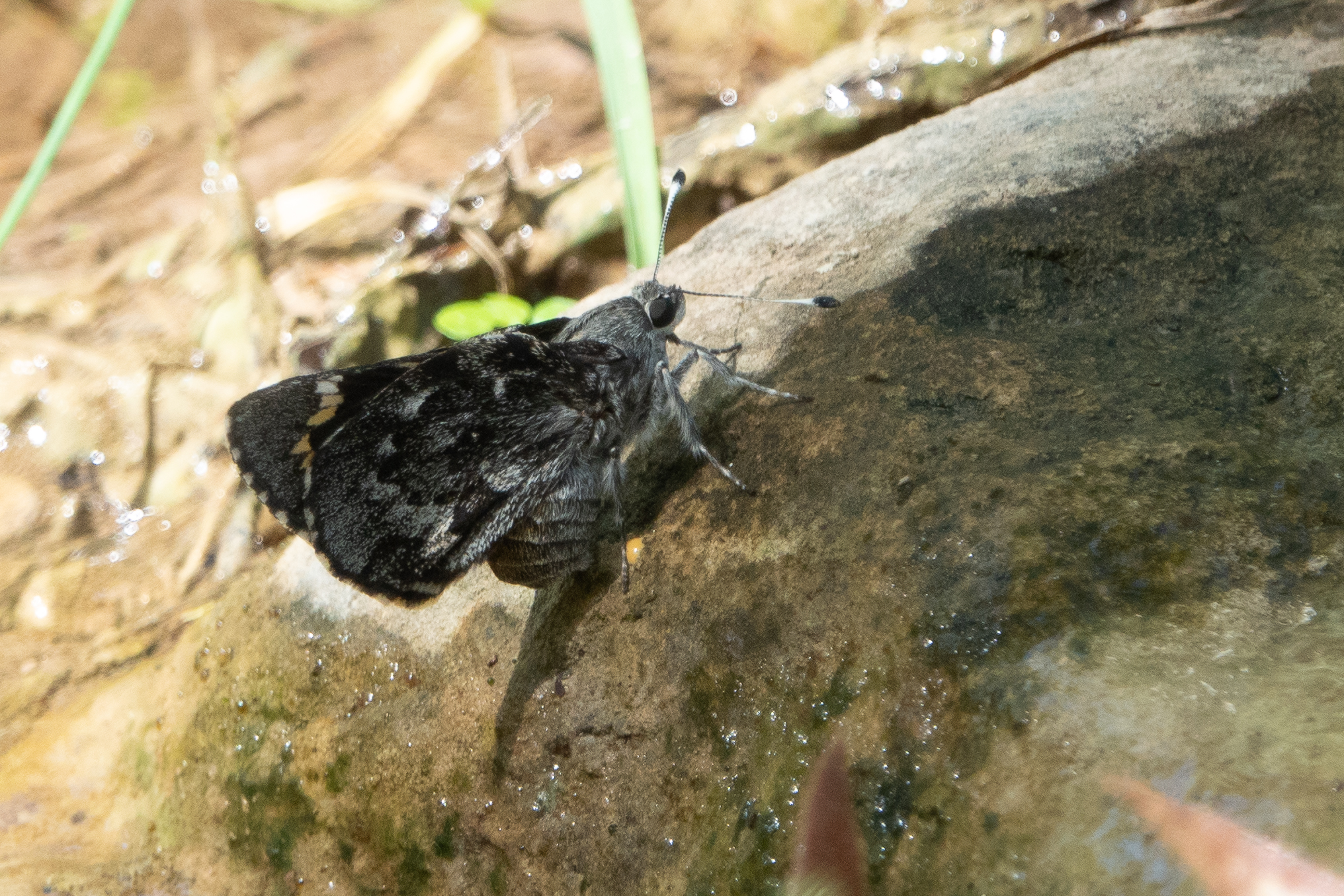

Scientific classification
- Kingdom: Animalia
- Phylum: Arthropoda
- Clade: Pancrustacea
- Class: Insecta
- Order: Lepidoptera
- Family: Hesperiidae
- Genus: Agathymus
- Species: A. evansi

Binomial name
- Agathymus evansi (H. Freeman, 1950)

= Agathymus evansi =

Species of butterfly

Agathymus evansi, the huachuca giant-skipper, is a species of giant skipper in the butterfly family Hesperiidae. It is found in Central America and North America.
