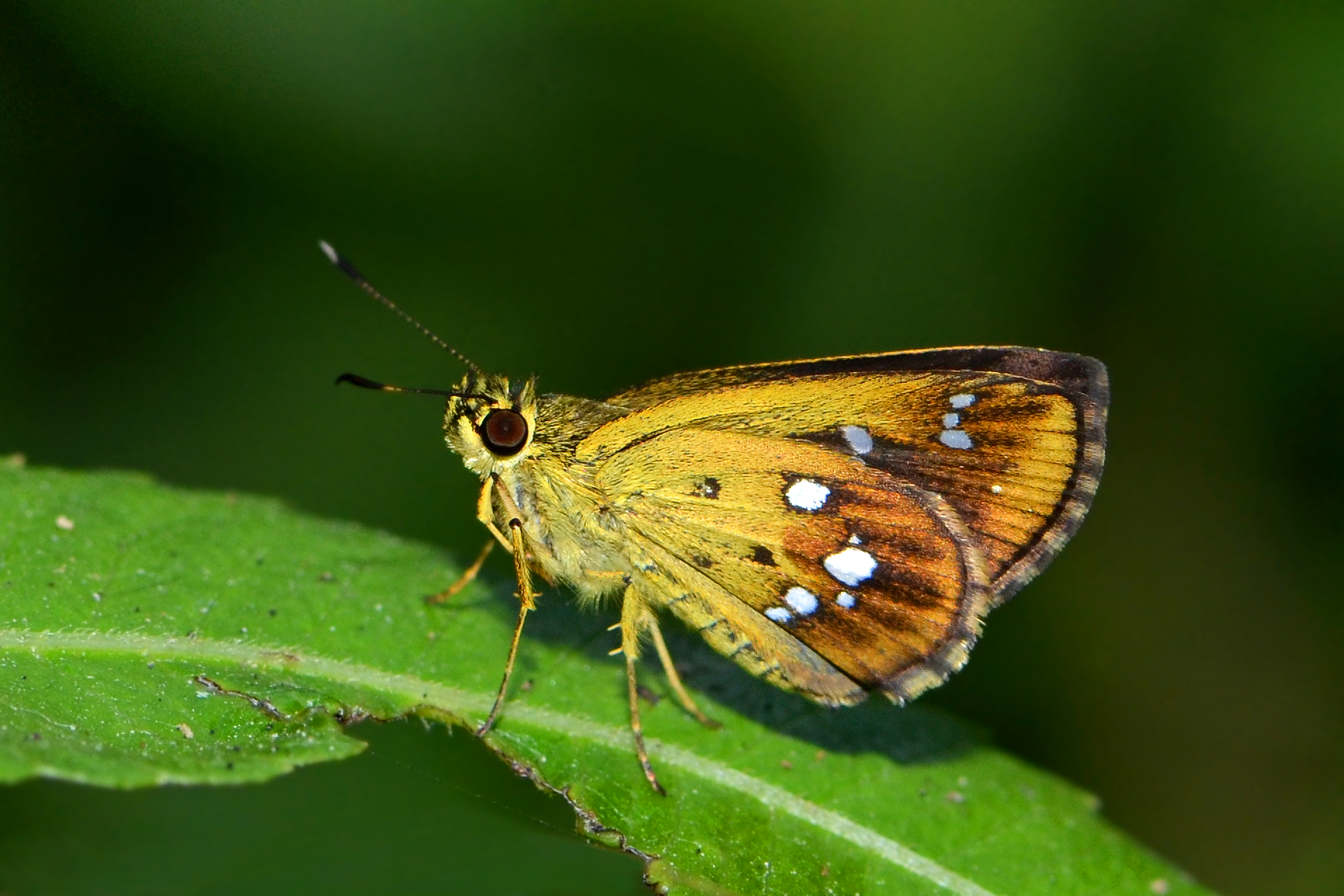

Scientific classification
- Kingdom: Animalia
- Phylum: Arthropoda
- Clade: Pancrustacea
- Class: Insecta
- Order: Lepidoptera
- Family: Hesperiidae
- Genus: Scobura
- Species: S. parawoolletti

Binomial name
- Scobura parawoolletti Fan, Chiba & Wang, 2010

= Scobura parawoolletti =

Species of butterfly

Scobura parawoolletti, also known as the Assam forest bob, is a butterfly in the family Hesperiidae. It is found in India, China and Vietnam. It was described by Xiaoling Fan, Hideyuki Chiba and Min Wang in 2010. This species is monotypic.

== Description ==
This species is similar to Scobura woolletti, but can be distinguished from it by having the underside ground colour ochreous and the white spots surrounded by large black spots.

The upperside is dark brown with the forewing cell spots conjoined and the hindwing having no spots. The underside forewing is brown and covered densely with yellow-brown scales while the underside hindwing is ochreous with large white spots surrounded by large black spots.
