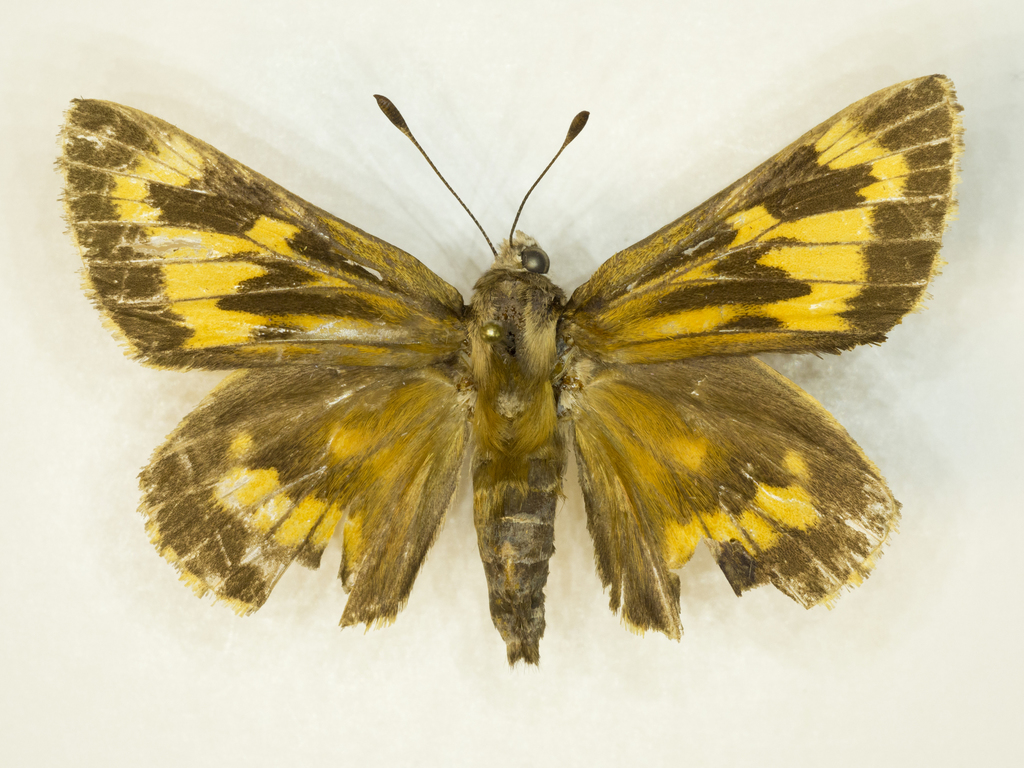

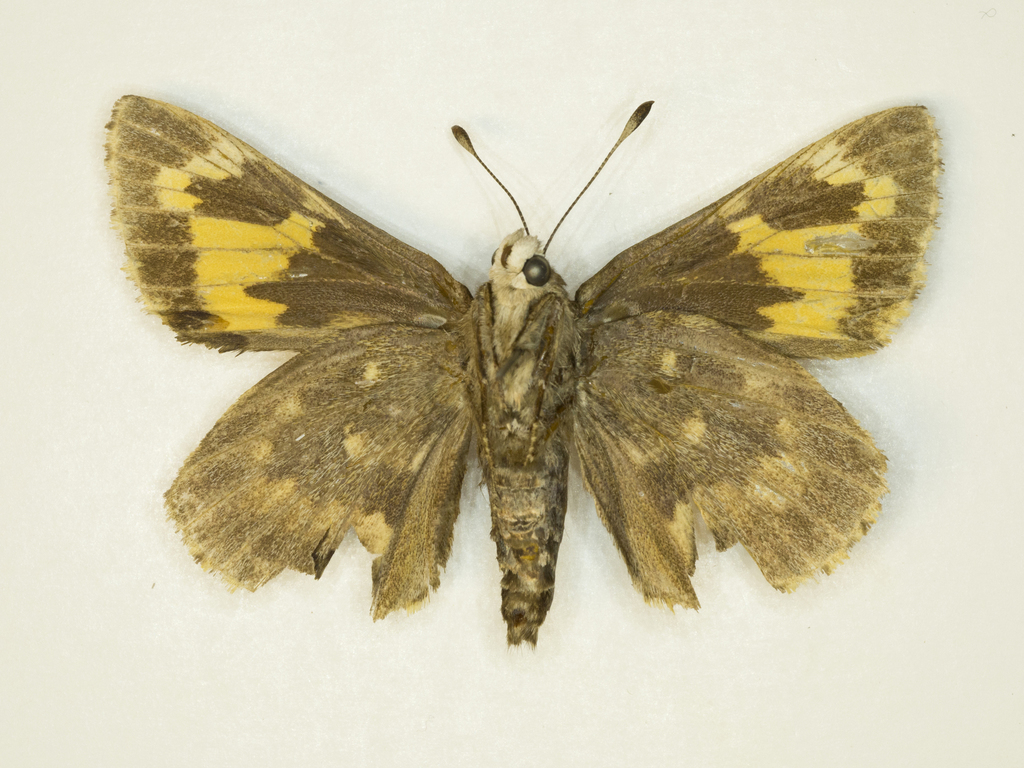

Scientific classification
- Kingdom: Animalia
- Phylum: Arthropoda
- Clade: Pancrustacea
- Class: Insecta
- Order: Lepidoptera
- Family: Hesperiidae
- Genus: Agathymus
- Species: A. alliae

Binomial name
- Agathymus alliae (D. Stallings & Turner, 1957)

= Agathymus alliae =

Species of butterfly

Agathymus alliae, the Mojave giant skipper, is a species of giant skipper in the family Hesperiidae. It is found in North America.

== Subspecies ==
- Agathymus alliae alliae (D. Stallings and Turner, 1957)
- Agathymus alliae paiute Roever in T. Emmel, 1998
