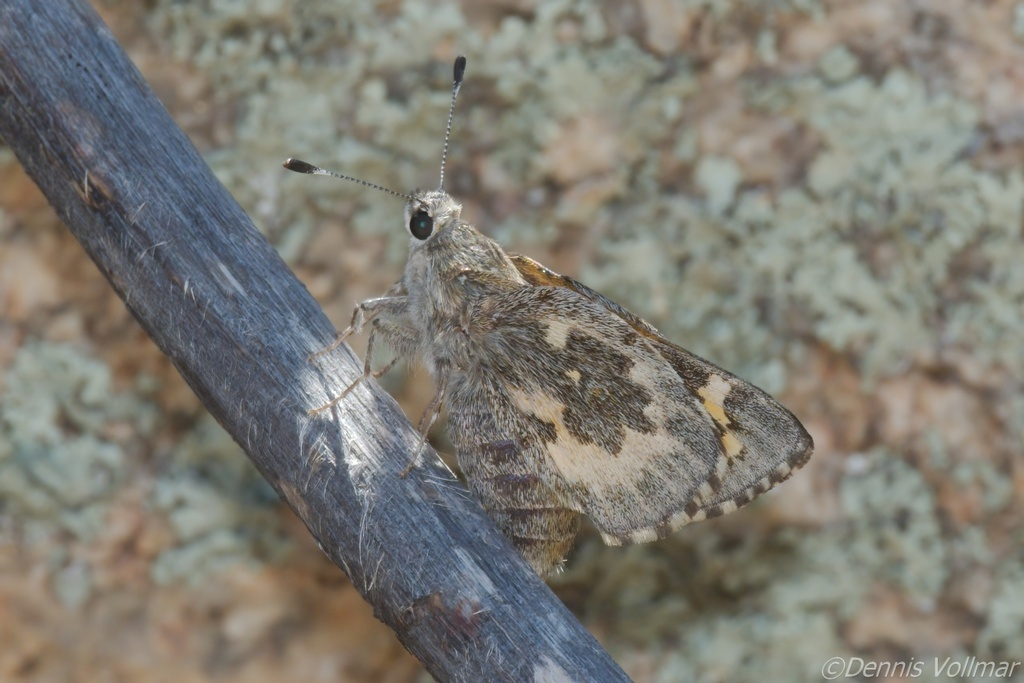

Scientific classification
- Kingdom: Animalia
- Phylum: Arthropoda
- Class: Insecta
- Order: Lepidoptera
- Family: Hesperiidae
- Genus: Agathymus
- Species: A. polingi

Binomial name
- Agathymus polingi (Skinner, 1905)

Synonyms
- Megathymus polingi; Megathymus polingi polingi; Agathymus polingi

= Agathymus polingi =

Species of butterfly

Agathymus polingi, or Poling's giant skipper, is a species of giant skipper in the butterfly family Hesperiidae. It is found in Central America and North America.

The MONA or Hodges number for Agathymus polingi is 4143.
