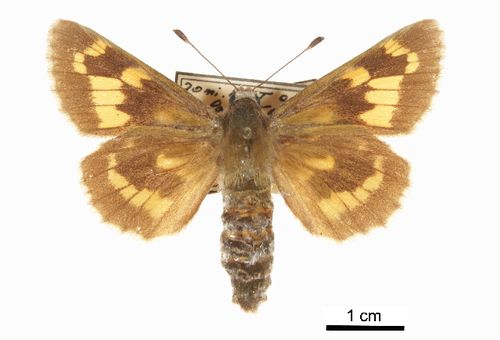

Scientific classification
- Kingdom: Animalia
- Phylum: Arthropoda
- Clade: Pancrustacea
- Class: Insecta
- Order: Lepidoptera
- Family: Hesperiidae
- Genus: Agathymus
- Species: A. mariae

Binomial name
- Agathymus mariae (Barnes & Benjamin, 1924)

= Agathymus mariae =

Species of butterfly

Agathymus mariae, the lechuguilla giant skipper, is a species of giant skipper in the family of butterflies known as Hesperiidae. Other common names include Mary's giant skipper and five-spot skipper. It was first described by William Barnes and Foster Hendrickson Benjamin in 1924 and it is found in Central and North America.

The MONA or Hodges number for Agathymus mariae is 4136.

== Subspecies ==
Five subspecies belong to Agathymus mariae:

- Agathymus mariae chinatiensis H. Freeman, 1964^{i g}
- Agathymus mariae lajitaensis H. Freeman, 1964^{i g}
- Agathymus mariae mariae (Barnes & Benjamin, 1924)^{i g}
- Agathymus mariae micheneri Stallings, Turner & Stallings, 1961^{c g}
- Agathymus mariae rindgei H. Freeman, 1964^{i g}

Data sources: i = ITIS, c = Catalogue of Life, g = GBIF, b = Bugguide.net
