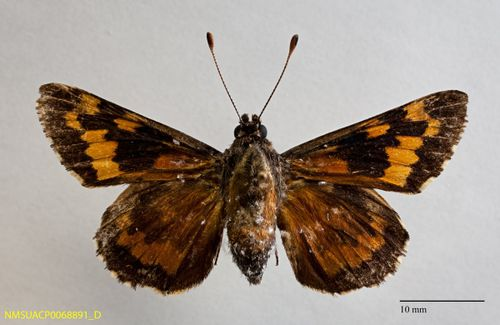

Scientific classification
- Kingdom: Animalia
- Phylum: Arthropoda
- Class: Insecta
- Order: Lepidoptera
- Family: Hesperiidae
- Genus: Agathymus
- Species: A. neumoegeni

Binomial name
- Agathymus neumoegeni (W. H. Edwards, 1882)

= Agathymus neumoegeni =

Orange giant-skipper

Species of butterfly

Agathymus neumoegeni is commonly referred to as the orange giant-skipper, Neumogen's giant-skipper, Neumogen's agave borer, Neumogen's moth-skipper, and tawny giant-skipper.

== Physical characteristics ==
This butterfly is typified by its orange spots. The upperside of its wings are an orange to yellowish orange with black margins and black patches. The underside of the hindwings are colored a darker shade of gray and marked by a pale shaded band. Also found on the underside of the wings are two indistinct white spots along its upper boundaries. However, there are small discrepancies between the female and male genders of the orange giant-skippers. The males have orange spots that form a band on both the forewing and the hindwing. The outside portion of spot seven overlies the interior edge of spot six on its forewing. In females, the orange band is thicker and the inner end of spot nine on its forewing is pointed. Both genders have a wingspan that ranges from 1.75 to 2.375 inches (44.5 to 60.3 mm). The caterpillar form of the orange giant-skipper has a body that is usually a greenish or bluish white with a dark brown head Different from "true butterflies", skippers rest with their forewings open at a 45-degree angle and hindwings horizontal. Skippers are grouped together in part because of their swiftly direct and vigorous flight patterns. The butterfly deemed the Arizona giant-skipper (Agathymus aryxna) is sometimes confused with the orange giant-skipper due to their similar post median bands and coloring. However, the orange giant-skipper is typically distinguishable by its broader bands and its abundant orange coloring. Also, the Arizona giant-skipper has fringes that are almost always checked white and black while the orange giant-skipper's fringes are usually no more than black.

== Habitat ==
The orange giant-skipper survives in a dry grassland or in an open woodland habitat and has been found near mesas and mountains at 2165–2790 meters. They can be found in central Arizona, Texas and New Mexico more commonly between the months of May and September. The skipper only takes flight once a year, during the months of September and October. However, akin to the majority of giant-skippers, the orange giant-skipper adults are usually difficult to find; the caterpillars may be more easily discovered in the host plants. This bright insect can sometimes be spotted flying around agaves in Carlsbad Caverns National Park, New Mexico.

The host plant for the orange giant-skipper caterpillar is Parry's agave (Agave parryi). The young caterpillars eat plant pulp before hibernation. Adult males feed on moisture from mud or manure while the adult females do not feed at all.

== Reproduction ==
From early morning until noon the male orange-giant skipper will sit near host plants to wait for receptive females. The female lays around 80 to 150 eggs and lives less than a week. The eggs are a pale yellow that later turn a deep red and orange and hatch within eighteen to nineteen days. They are laid individually on or nearby the host but end up falling to the base of the plant because they are not glued on. The young caterpillar crawls to the tip of the leaf and burrows inside it, eating pulp and then hibernating. In the spring it makes a new burrow in a leaf base, which is where it feeds on sap until it once again becomes inactive for the summer. Before it pupates, the caterpillar expands the opening of its burrow and makes a silk trap door which is where the adult can emerge out from. Their pupation behavior is different from most other butterflies because they pupate in a cocoon of leaves and silken threads.
