= Agathymus remingtoni =

Scientific classification
- Kingdom: Animalia
- Phylum: Arthropoda
- Class: Insecta
- Order: Lepidoptera
- Family: Hesperiidae
- Genus: Agathymus
- Species: A. remingtoni

Binomial name
- Agathymus remingtoni (D. Stallings & Turner, 1958)

Species of butterfly

Agathymus remingtoni, the coahuila giant skipper, is a species of giant skipper in the butterfly family Hesperiidae. It is found in Central America.
