= Ligonipes =

Scientific classification
- Kingdom: Animalia
- Phylum: Arthropoda
- Subphylum: Chelicerata
- Class: Arachnida
- Order: Araneae
- Infraorder: Araneomorphae
- Family: Salticidae
- Subfamily: Salticinae
- Genus: Ligonipes; Karsch, 1878

Type species
- Ligonipes illustris Karsch, 1878

Species
- See text.

Diversity
- 6 species

Genus of spiders

Ligonipes is a spider genus of the jumping spider family, Salticidae. Five of the six described species are found in the Australian region, the exception being Ligonipes similis, recorded as being from Sumatra. Their body form mimics ants.

L. semitectus is a very common spider in Queensland, Australia. Males are 4 mm long, females 5 mm. There has been no information about L. similis (formerly in genus Rhombonotus) since its original description in 1882.

== Species ==
As of April 2017, the World Spider Catalog accepted the following species:

- Ligonipes flavipes Rainbow, 1920 – Norfolk Island
- Ligonipes illustris Karsch, 1878 – Queensland
- Ligonipes lacertosus (Thorell, 1881) – Queensland
- Ligonipes semitectus (Simon, 1900) – Queensland
- Ligonipes similis (Hasselt, 1882) – Sumatra
- Ligonipes synageloides (Szombathy, 1915) – New Guinea
