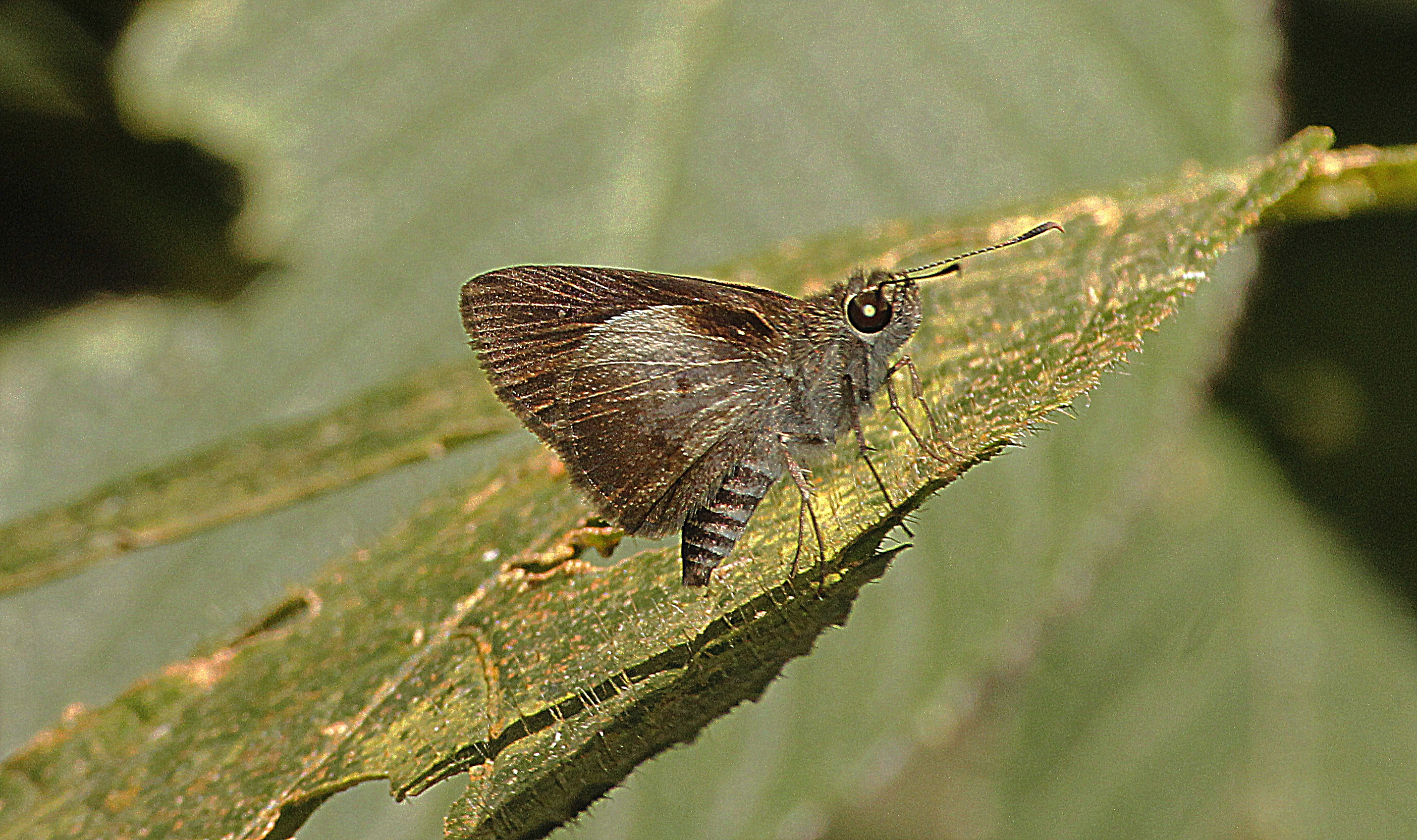

Scientific classification
- Kingdom: Animalia
- Phylum: Arthropoda
- Class: Insecta
- Order: Lepidoptera
- Family: Hesperiidae
- Genus: Suastus
- Species: S. minutus

Binomial name
- Suastus minutus (Moore, 1877)

= Suastus minutus =

Small palm bob

Species of butterfly

Suastus minutus, the small palm bob, is a butterfly belonging to the family Hesperiidae. It is found in the Indomalayan realm - south India, Sikkim to Burma, Sri Lanka, Thailand, Laos, Hainan, Vietnam and (S. m. flemingi Eliot, 1973) Malaya.

== Description ==
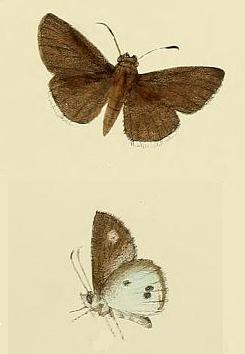
Illustration

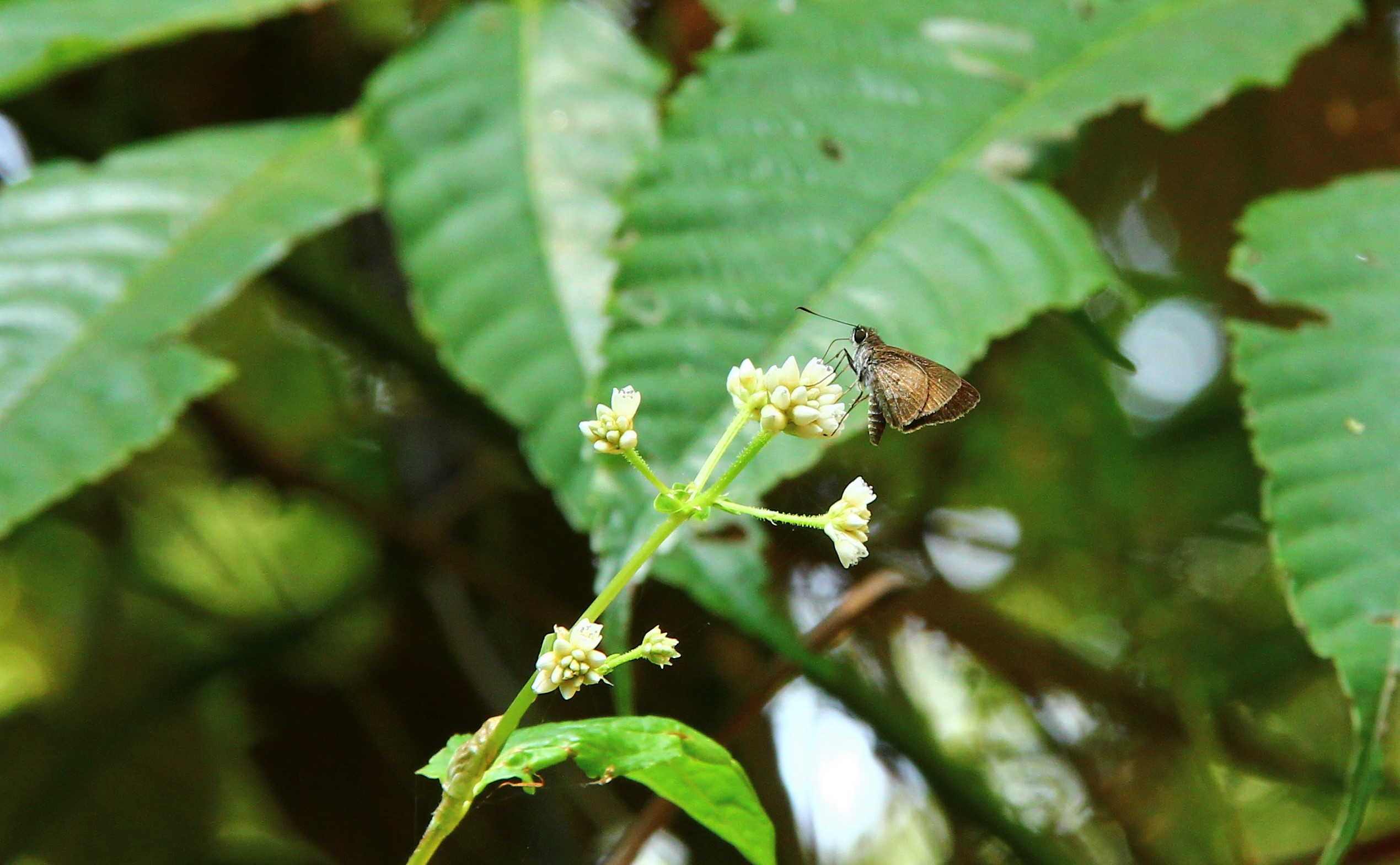
Small palm bob

Male. Upperside dark blackish-brown, without any markings. Cilia of forewing brown, whitish at hinder angle, of hindwing white, with a few brown marks in it. Underside. Forewing paler brown, an obscure whitish mark at the upper end of the cell and another (less obscure) in the middle of the interno-median inter.space. Hindwing with the costal space broadly suffused with brown, the re.st of the wing; blue grey, sparsely covered with minute brown scales, thickest towards the outer margin, a small black spot at the end of the cell, a large one in the middle of the interno-median interspace, with a spot or two, more or less obsolescent, above it, a black spot at the anal angle, with one or two obscure spots on the margin in the interspaces above it. Antennae black, with whitish dots on the underside; palpi, head and body blackish brown above, grey on the underside, legs brown above, grey beneath.

Female like the male, but with comparatively longer forewing; on the underside, the whitish mark in the middle of the interno-median interspace is large, the grey portion of the hindwing is paler, the anal spot generally absent.

— Charles Swinhoe, Lepidoptera Indica. Vol. X
