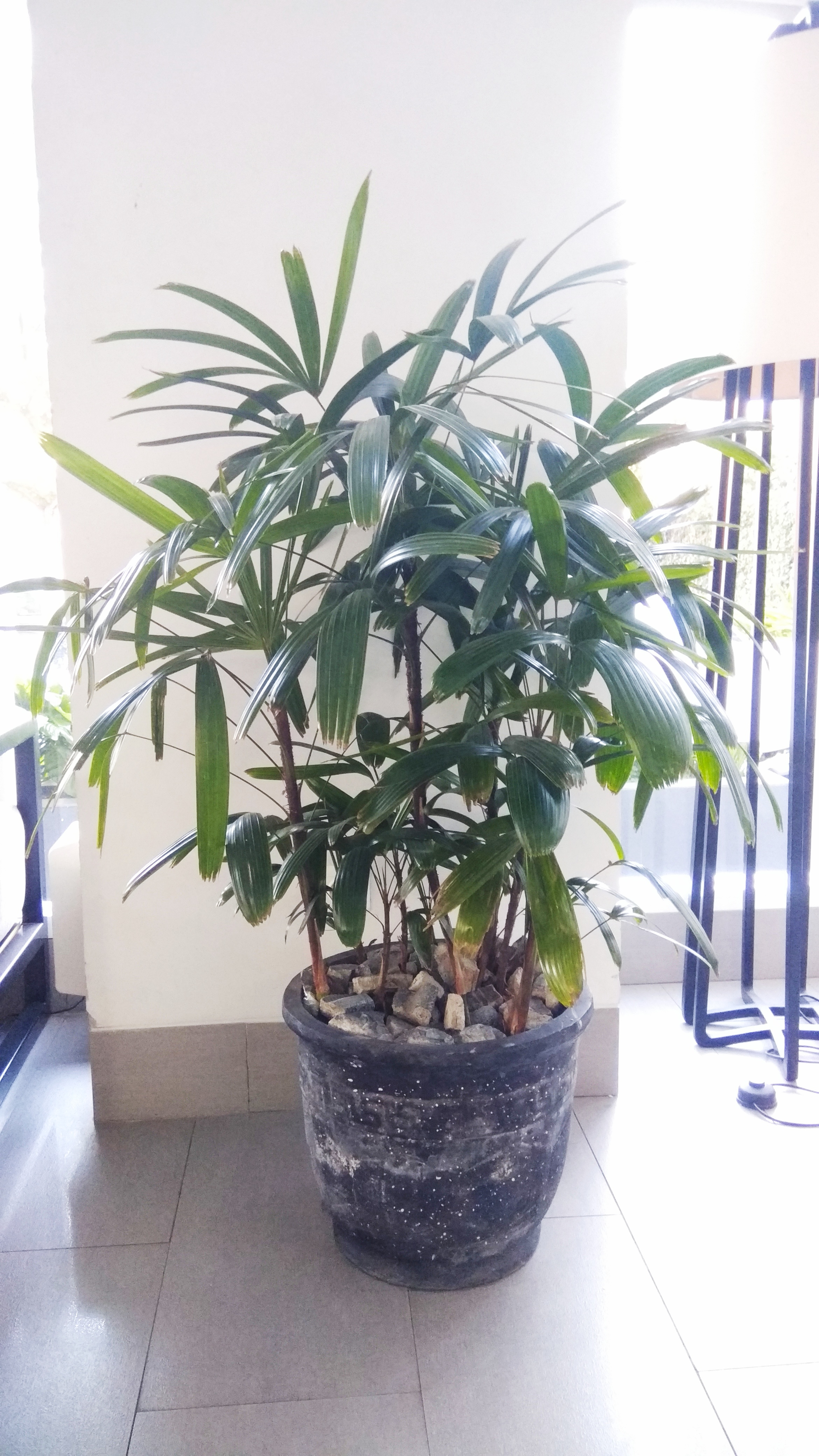
- Rhapis excelsa at hotel Citradream Cirebon Lobby

Scientific classification
- Kingdom: Plantae
- Clade: Tracheophytes
- Clade: Angiosperms
- Clade: Monocots
- Clade: Commelinids
- Order: Arecales
- Family: Arecaceae
- Tribe: Trachycarpeae
- Genus: Rhapis
- Species: R. excelsa

Binomial name
- Rhapis excelsa (Thunb.) A.Henry

= Rhapis excelsa =

Broadleaf lady palm

Species of palm

Rhapis excelsa, also known as broadleaf lady palm or bamboo palm, is a species of fan palm (Arecaceae subfamily Coryphoideae, tribe Trachycarpeae) in the genus Rhapis. It is native to southern China and northern Vietnam. The genus name is Greek - rhapis, meaning "needle"; and the species name is Latin for "tall", though R. excelsa is not the tallest in the genus.

== Description ==
Rhapis excelsa grows up to 4 m (13.1 feet) in height and 30 mm (1.2 inches) in diameter in multi-stemmed clumps with glossy, palmate evergreen leaves divided into broad, ribbed segments. Leaf segments are single or few in young plants and increase to a dozen or more in mature plants; segments are divided to the petiole. Leaf-ends are saw-toothed unlike most other palms, occurring on slender petioles ranging from 20 to 60 cm (0.8 to 2.4 inches) in length. New foliage emerges from a fibrous sheath which remains attached to the base. As the plants age, the sheaths fall, revealing the bamboo-like trunks. This usually dioecious palm species produces a small inflorescence at the top of the plant with spirally-arranged, fleshy yellow flowers containing three petals fused at the base. Ripe fruit are fleshy and white, though R. excelsa more readily propagates via underground rhizome offshoots.

In the UK this plant has gained the Royal Horticultural Society's Award of Garden Merit.

== Gallery ==
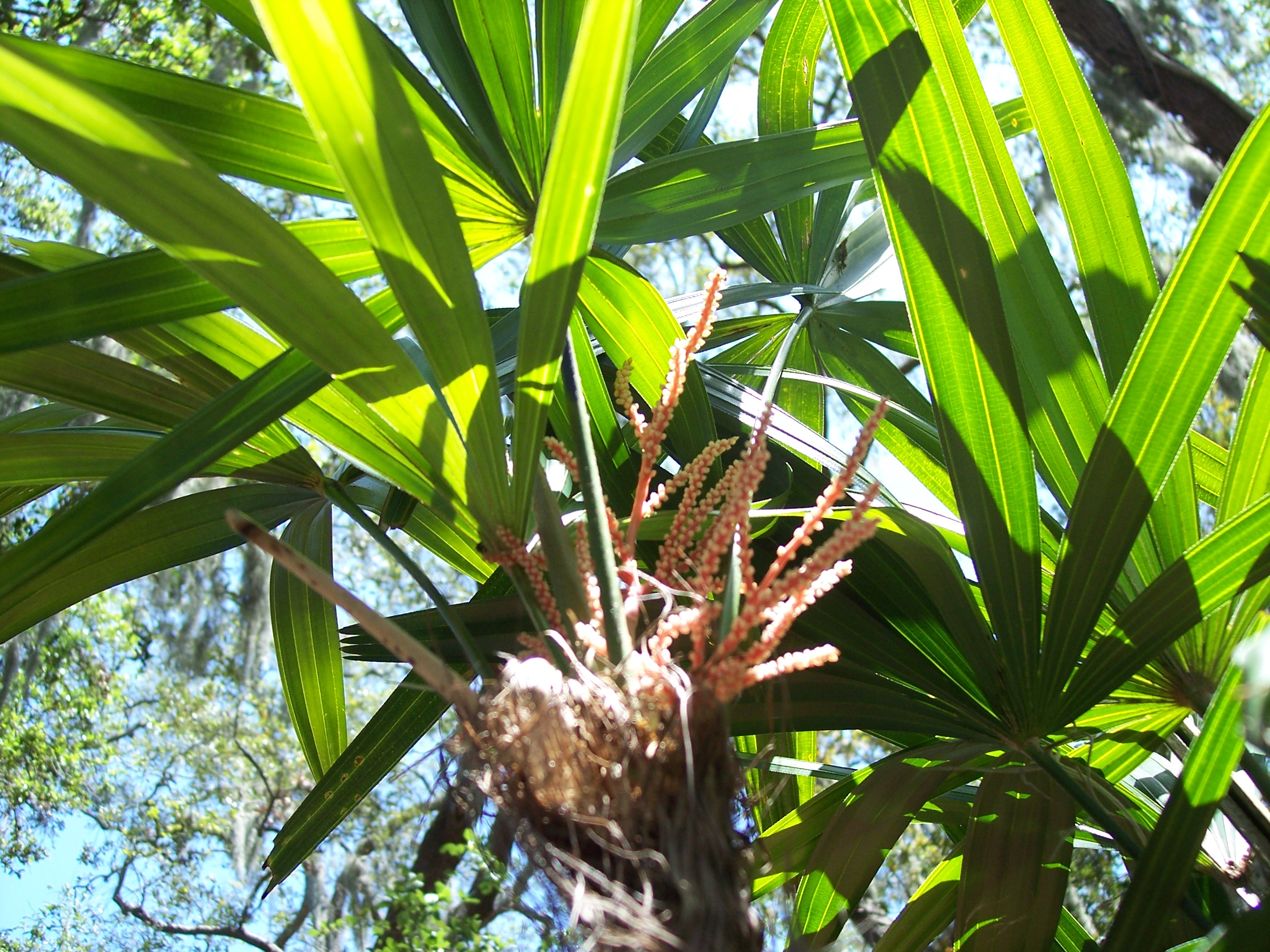
Immature inflorescence

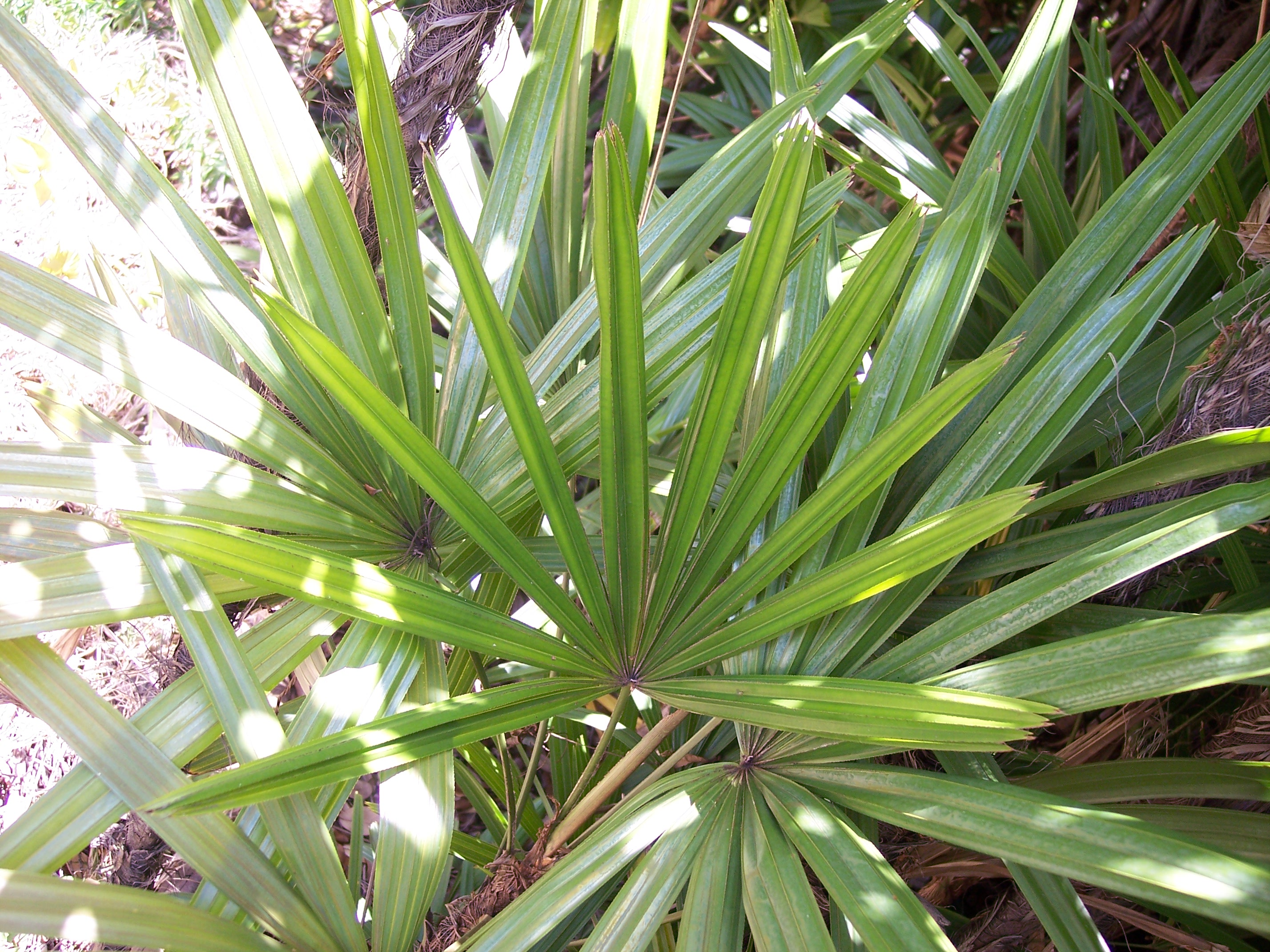
R. excelsa foliage

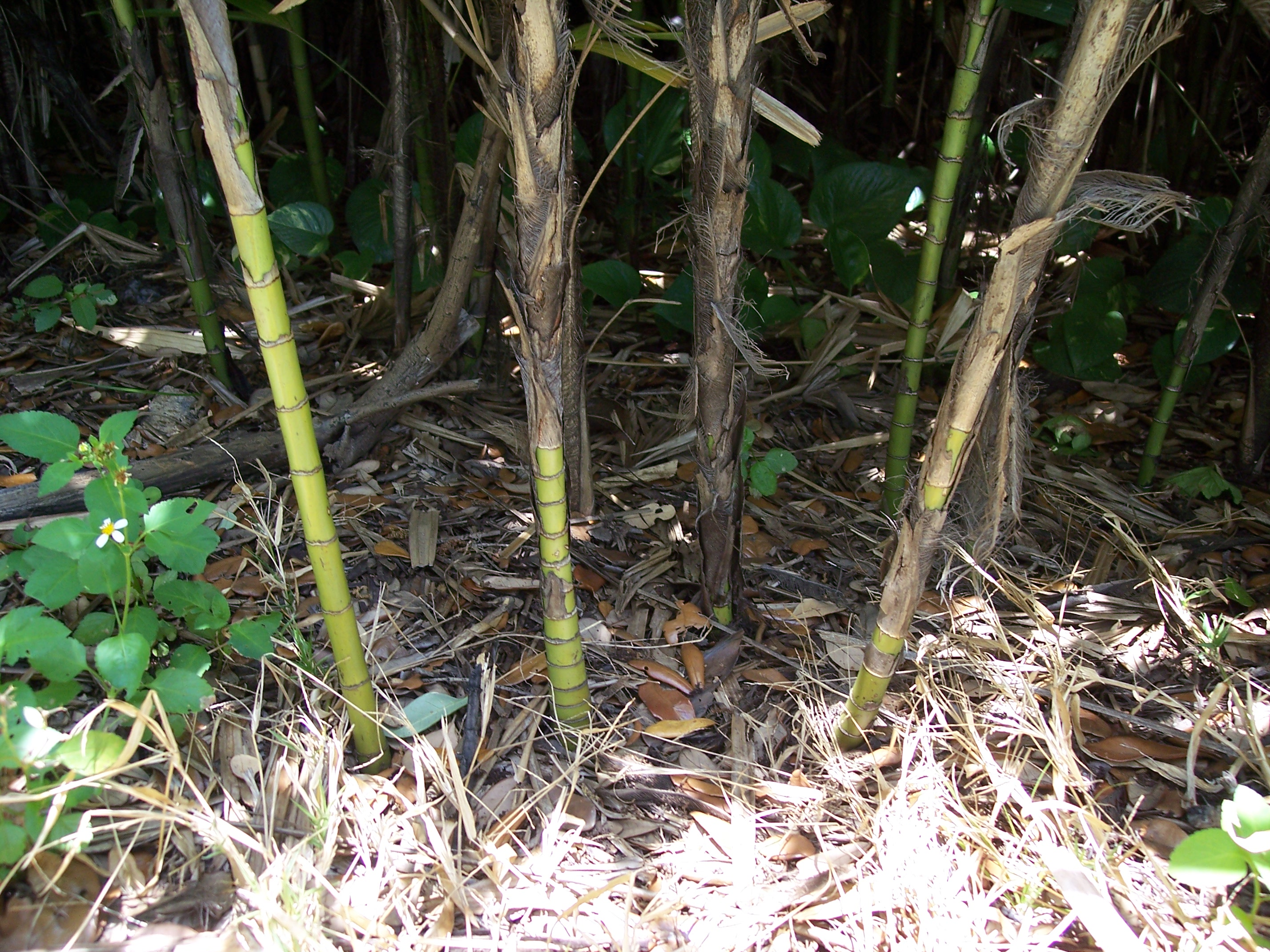
Sheathed and exposed stems

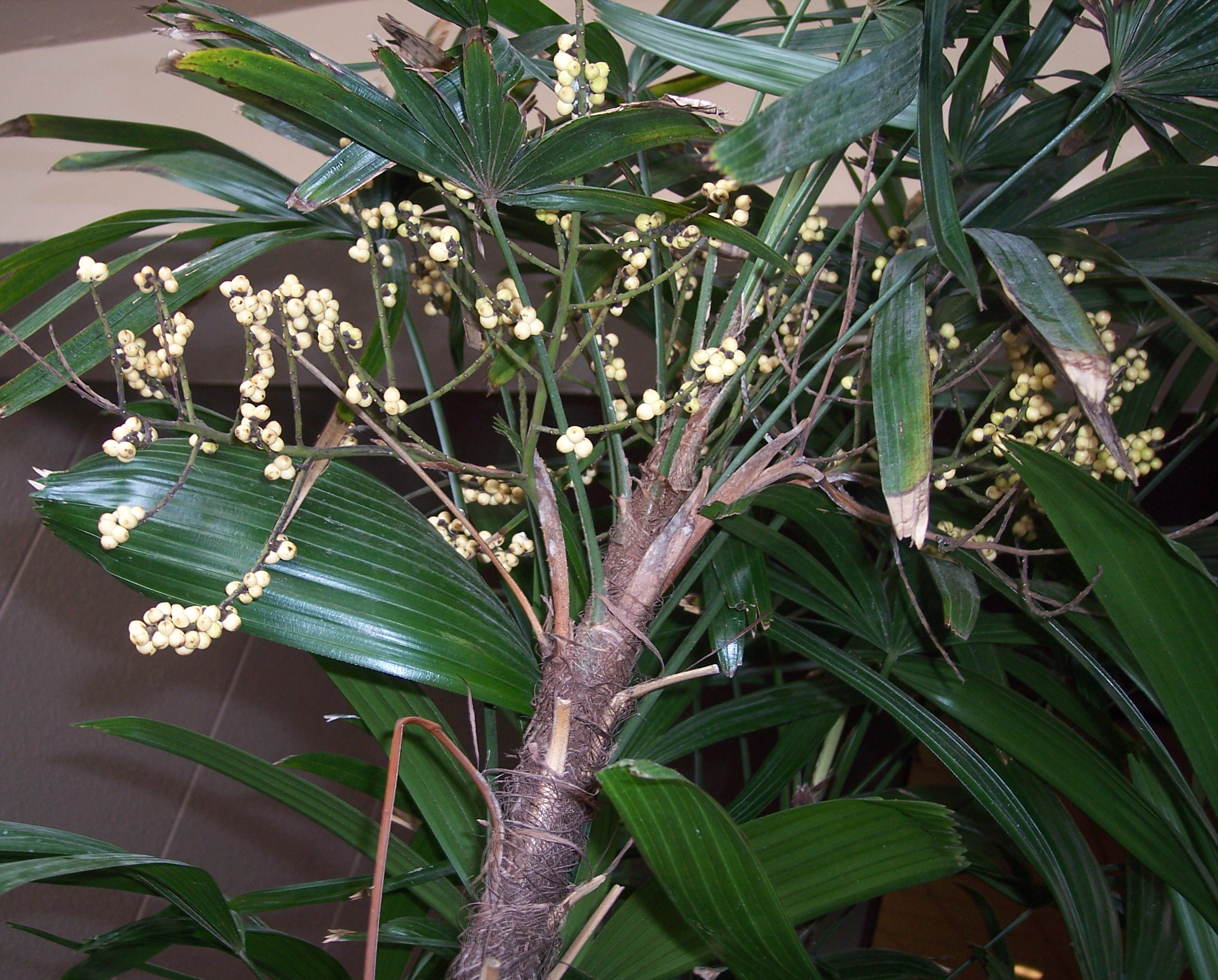
In fruit

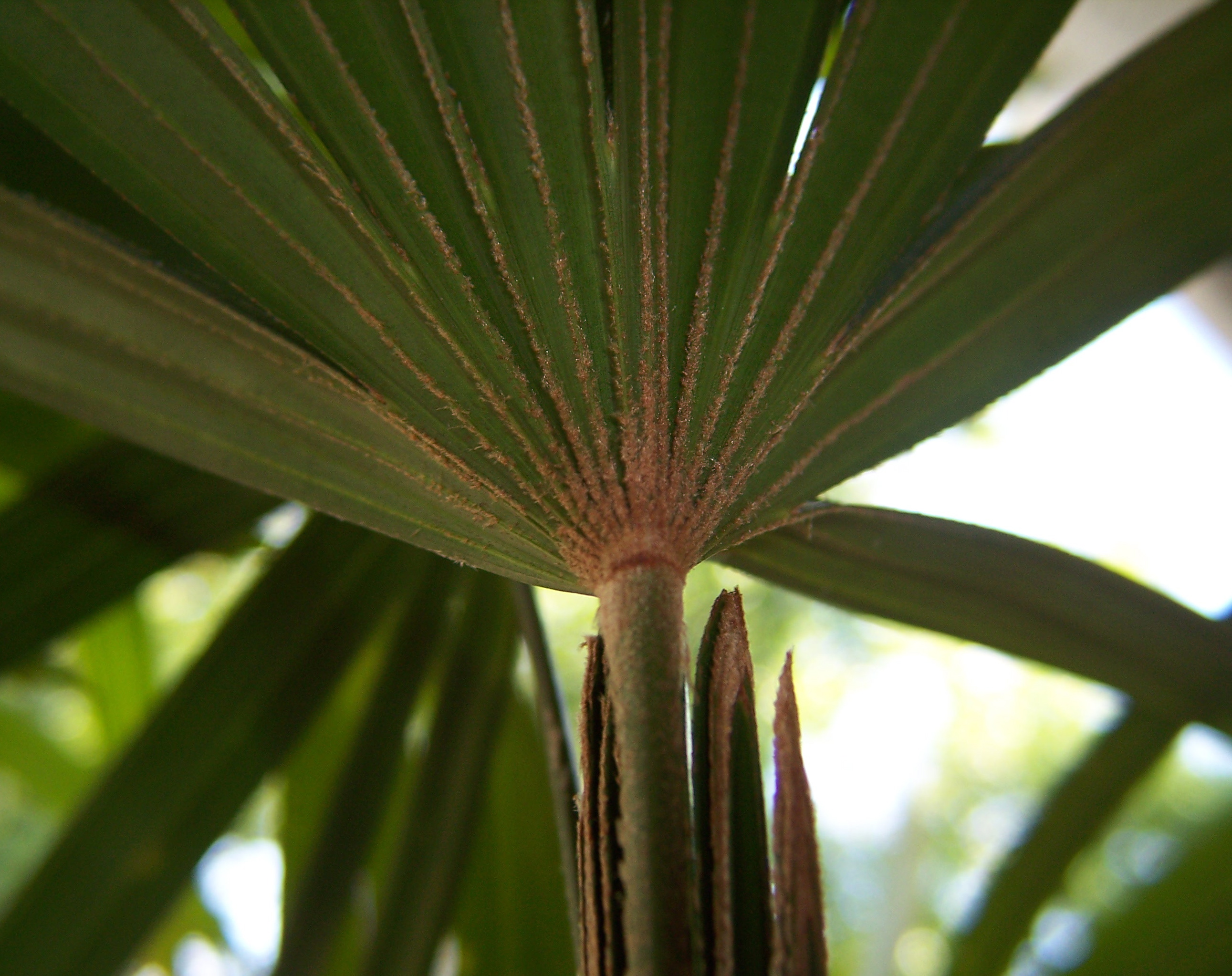
Proximally tomentose abaxial midribs

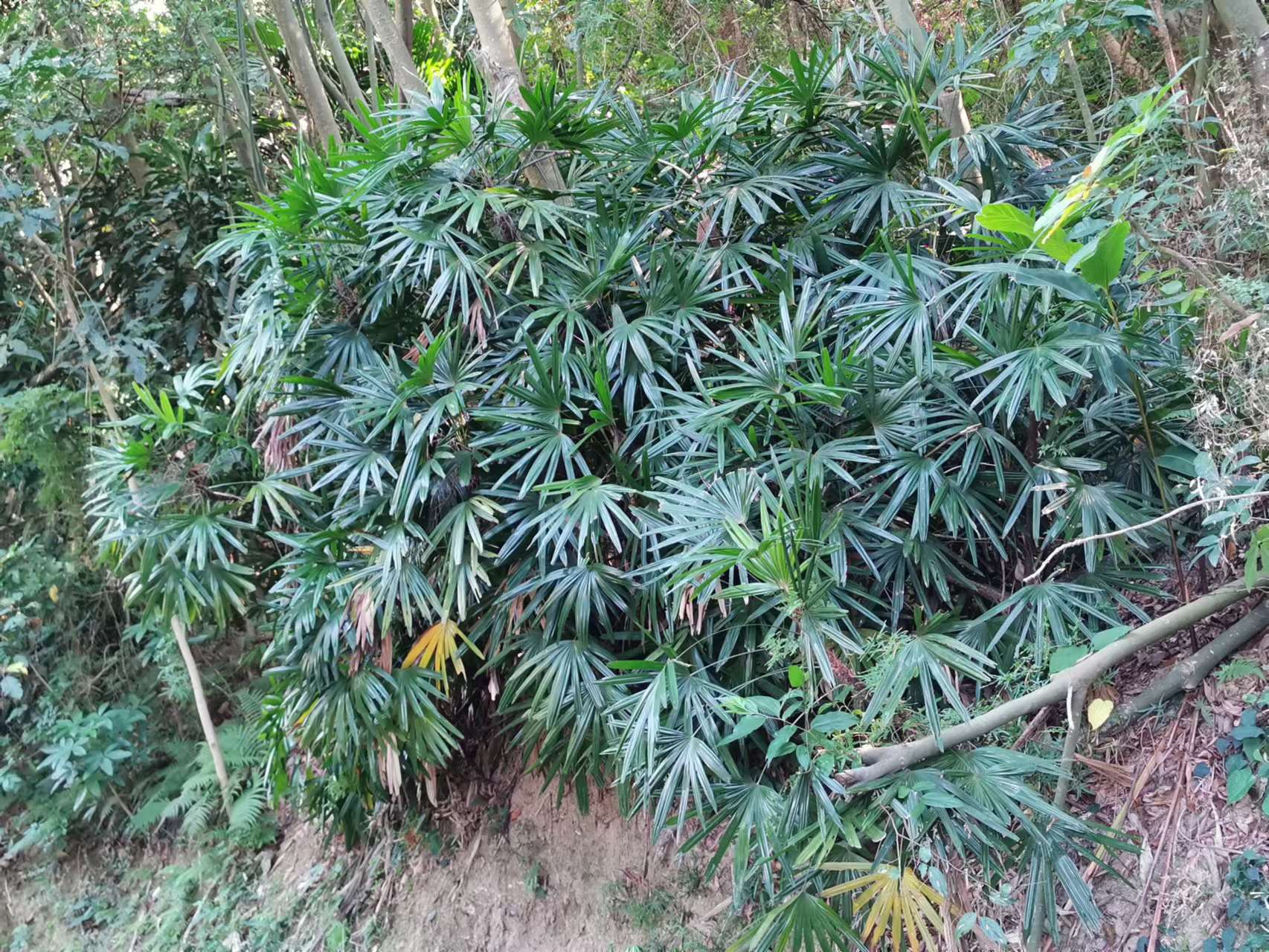
Stems clustered. Taken on a mountain road.

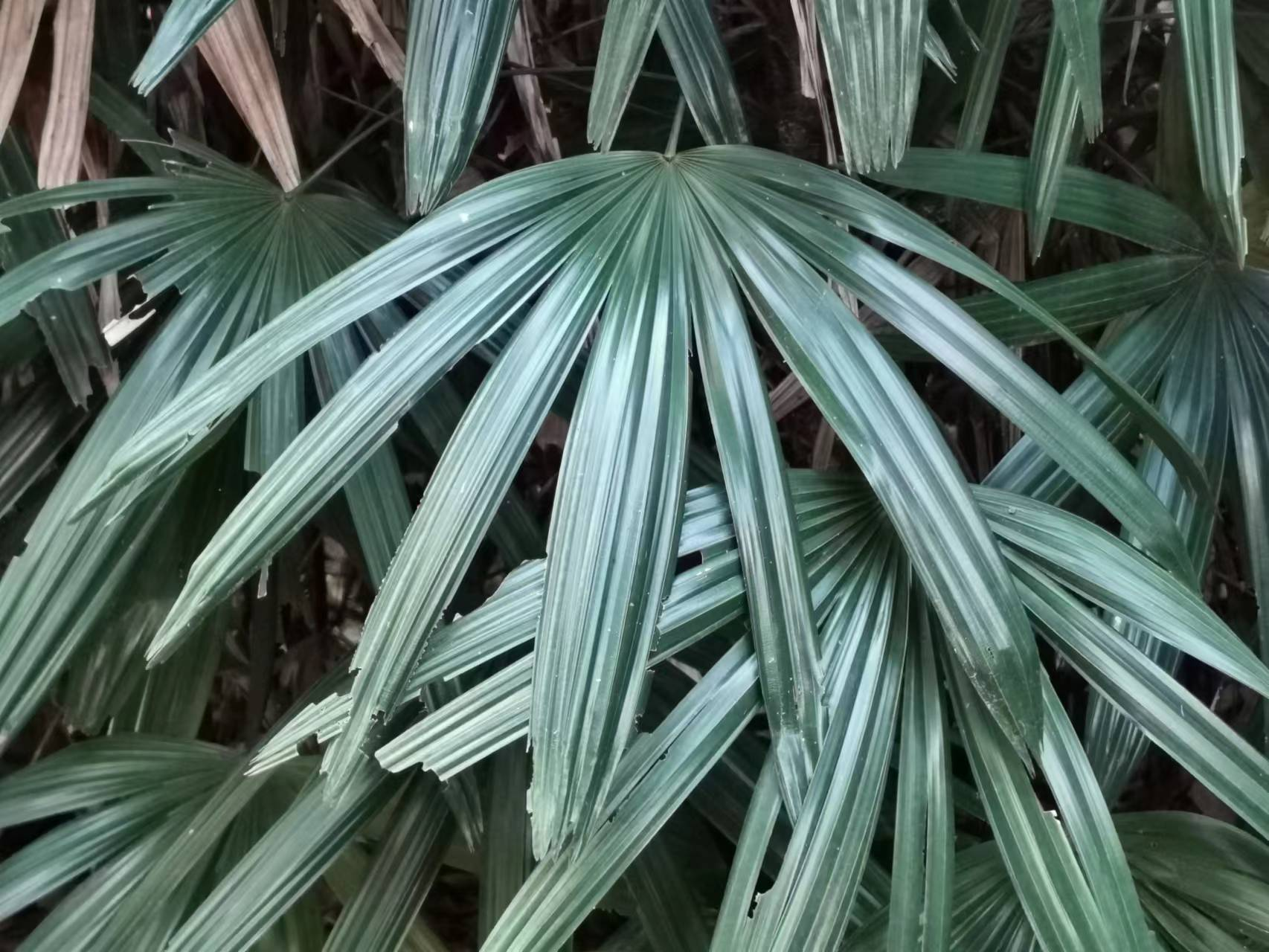
The middle segment(s) of the leaf is broader.
