= Ludwig Carl Christian Koch =

German entomologist and arachnologist

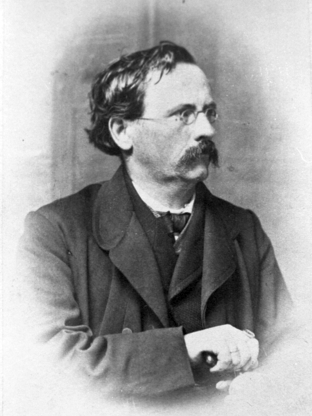
- Ludwig Carl Christian Koch 1825 - 1908
- Born: 8 November 1825; Regensburg, Kingdom of Bavaria, German Confederation
- Died: 1 November 1908 (aged 82); Nuremberg, German Empire
- Scientific career
- Fields: Entomology and arachnology
- Author abbrev. (zoology): L.Koch

Ludwig Carl Christian Koch (8 November 1825 – 1 November 1908) was a German entomologist and arachnologist.

He was born in Regensburg, Germany, and died in Nuremberg, Germany. He studied in Nuremberg, initially law, but then turned to medicine and science. From 1850, he practiced as a physician in the Wöhrd district of Nuremberg.

He is considered among the four most influential scientists on insects and spiders in the second half of the 19th century. He wrote numerous works on the arachnoids of Europe, Siberia, and Australia. His work earned him worldwide reputation as "Spider Koch".

Sometimes confused with his father, Carl Ludwig Koch (1778–1857), another famous arachnologist, his name is abbreviated L. Koch on species descriptions; his father's name is abbreviated C.L. Koch

== Works ==
Die Arachniden Australiens (1871-1883), his major work on Australian spiders, was completed by Eugen von Keyserling due to the onset of Koch's blindness (Worldcat).

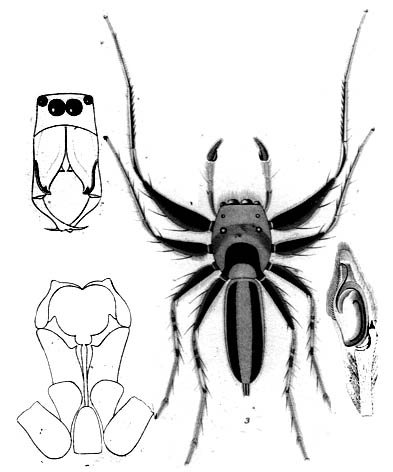
Cosmophasis micarioides L. Koch (drawn by L. Koch 1880)

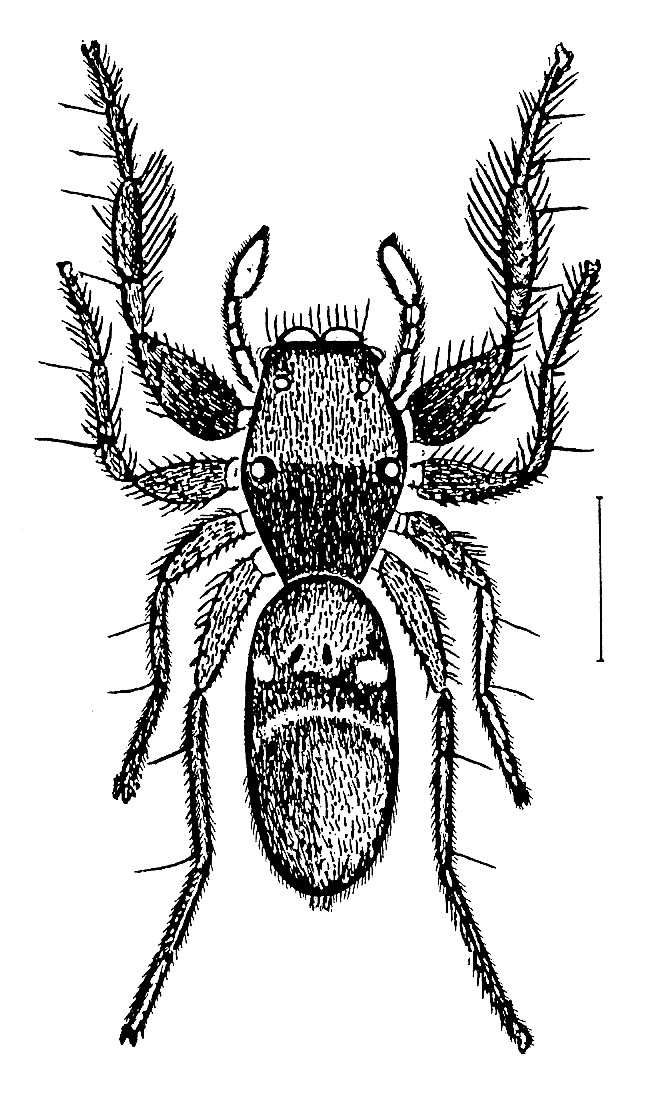
Rhombonotus gracilis (drawn by L. Koch, 1877)
