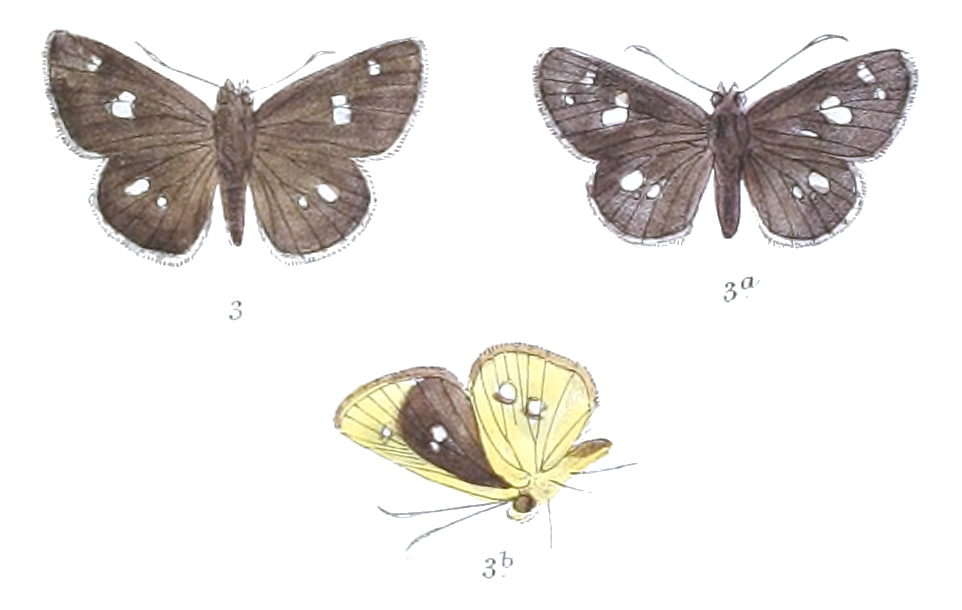
- Scobura cephala

Scientific classification
- Kingdom: Animalia
- Phylum: Arthropoda
- Clade: Pancrustacea
- Class: Insecta
- Order: Lepidoptera
- Family: Hesperiidae
- Tribe: Megathymini
- Genus: Scobura; Elwes & Edwards, 1897

= Scobura =

Genus of butterflies

Scobura is an Indomalayan genus of grass skippers in the family Hesperiidae.

== Species ==
- Scobura cephala (Hewitson, 1876) India ("Sikkim") to Myanmar, Thailand
- Scobura cephaloides (de Nicéville, [1889]) India (Assam), Myanmar, China (Tonkin)
  - S. c. ephaloides (de Nicéville, [1889])
  - S. c. kinka Evans, 1949 Burma, Thailand, Laos, Vietnam, China (Hainan)
- Scobura coniata Hering, 1918 China
- Scobura eximia Devyatkin, 2002 Vietnam
- Scobura isota (Swinhoe, 1893) India ("Sikkim"), Malaysia, Myanmar, Laos, Thailand, Vietnam
- Scobura phiditia (Hewitson, [1866]) Assam to Burma, Thailand, Laos, Vietnam, Malaysia, Borneo, Sumatra
- Scobura tytleri (Evans, 1914) India (Manipur), Laos, Vietnam.
- Scobura woolletti (Riley, 1923) Myanmar, Thailand, Laos, Malaysia, Borneo

== Biology ==
The larvae of Scobura coniata feed on Gramineae including Indocalamus
