= Agathymus baueri =

Scientific classification
- Kingdom: Animalia
- Phylum: Arthropoda
- Class: Insecta
- Order: Lepidoptera
- Family: Hesperiidae
- Genus: Agathymus
- Species: A. baueri

Binomial name
- Agathymus baueri (D. Stallings & Turner, 1954)

Species of butterfly

Agathymus baueri, or Bauer's giant-skipper, is a species of giant skipper in the family Hesperiidae. It is found in North America.

The MONA or Hodges number for Agathymus baueri is 4133.

== Subspecies ==
- Agathymus baueri baueri (D. Stallings and Turner, 1954)
- Agathymus baueri freemani D. Stallings and Turner, 1960
