= Rhapis gracilis =

Scientific classification
- Kingdom: Plantae
- Clade: Tracheophytes
- Clade: Angiosperms
- Clade: Monocots
- Clade: Commelinids
- Order: Arecales
- Family: Arecaceae
- Tribe: Trachycarpeae
- Genus: Rhapis
- Species: R. gracilis

Binomial name
- Rhapis gracilis Burret

Species of palm

Rhapis gracilis, the slender bamboo palm, is a multi-stemmed palm tree native to southern China. Its stems are thin to only 10mm in diameter, and it produces round fruit which are usually about 8 mm in diameter.
