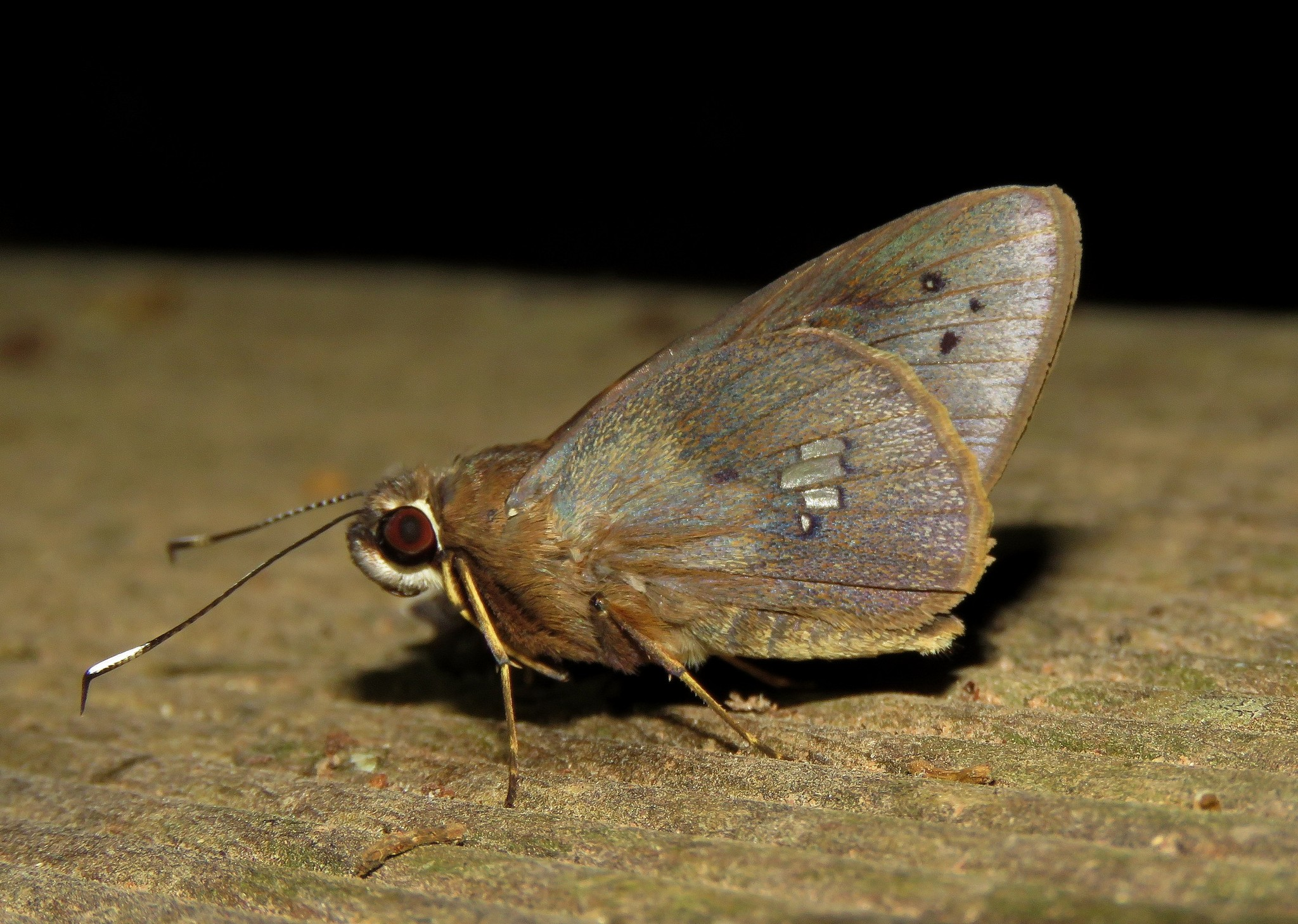
- Carystoides basoches

Scientific classification
- Kingdom: Animalia
- Phylum: Arthropoda
- Class: Insecta
- Order: Lepidoptera
- Family: Hesperiidae
- Subtribe: Carystoidina
- Genus: Carystoides; Godman, 1901

= Carystoides =

Genus of butterflies

Carystoides is a genus of skippers in the family Hesperiidae.
