= Stallingsia =

Scientific classification
- Kingdom: Animalia
- Phylum: Arthropoda
- Class: Insecta
- Order: Lepidoptera
- Family: Hesperiidae
- Tribe: Megathymini
- Genus: Stallingsia; Freeman, 1959

Species
- See text.

Genus of butterflies

Stallingsia is a genus of butterflies in the skipper family, Hesperiidae.

== Selected species ==
- Stallingsia jacki
- Stallingsia maculosus
- Stallingsia smithi
