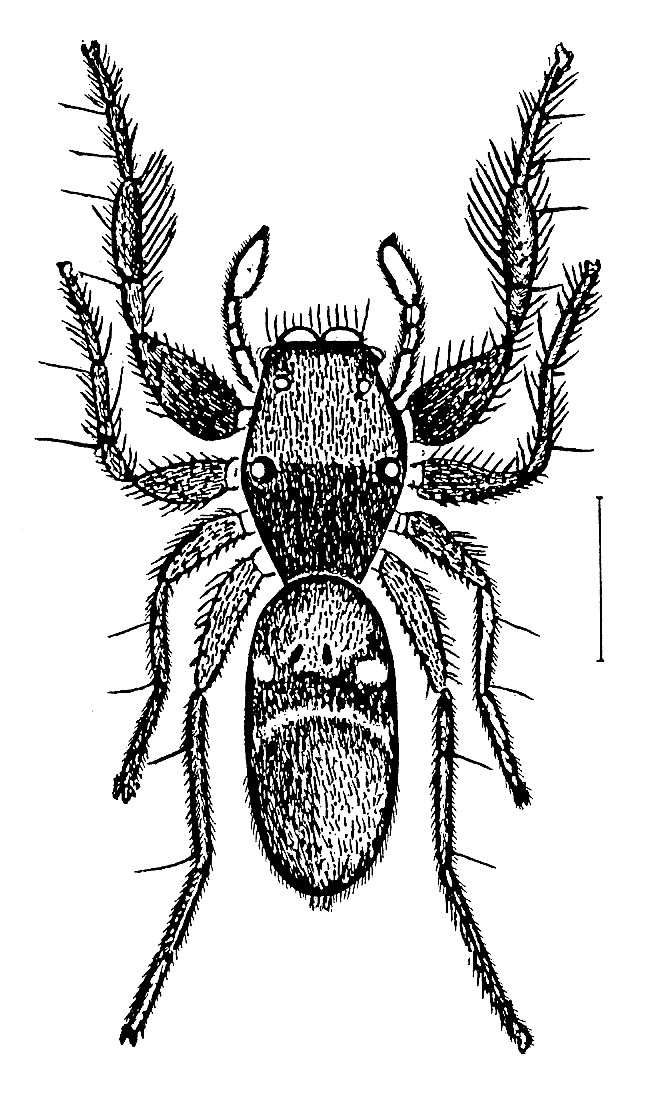
- R. gracilis

Scientific classification
- Kingdom: Animalia
- Phylum: Arthropoda
- Subphylum: Chelicerata
- Class: Arachnida
- Order: Araneae
- Infraorder: Araneomorphae
- Family: Salticidae
- Genus: Rhombonotus; L. Koch, 1879
- Species: R. gracilis

Binomial name
- Rhombonotus gracilis L. Koch, 1879

= Rhombonotus =

Genus of spiders

Rhombonotus is a monotypic genus of jumping spiders containing the single species, Rhombonotus gracilis. It was first described by Ludwig Carl Christian Koch in 1879, and is found only in Queensland. The name is a combination of the Ancient Greek "rhumbo", meaning "rhombus", and "notos", meaning "back". The species name is from Latin gracilis, meaning "slender".
