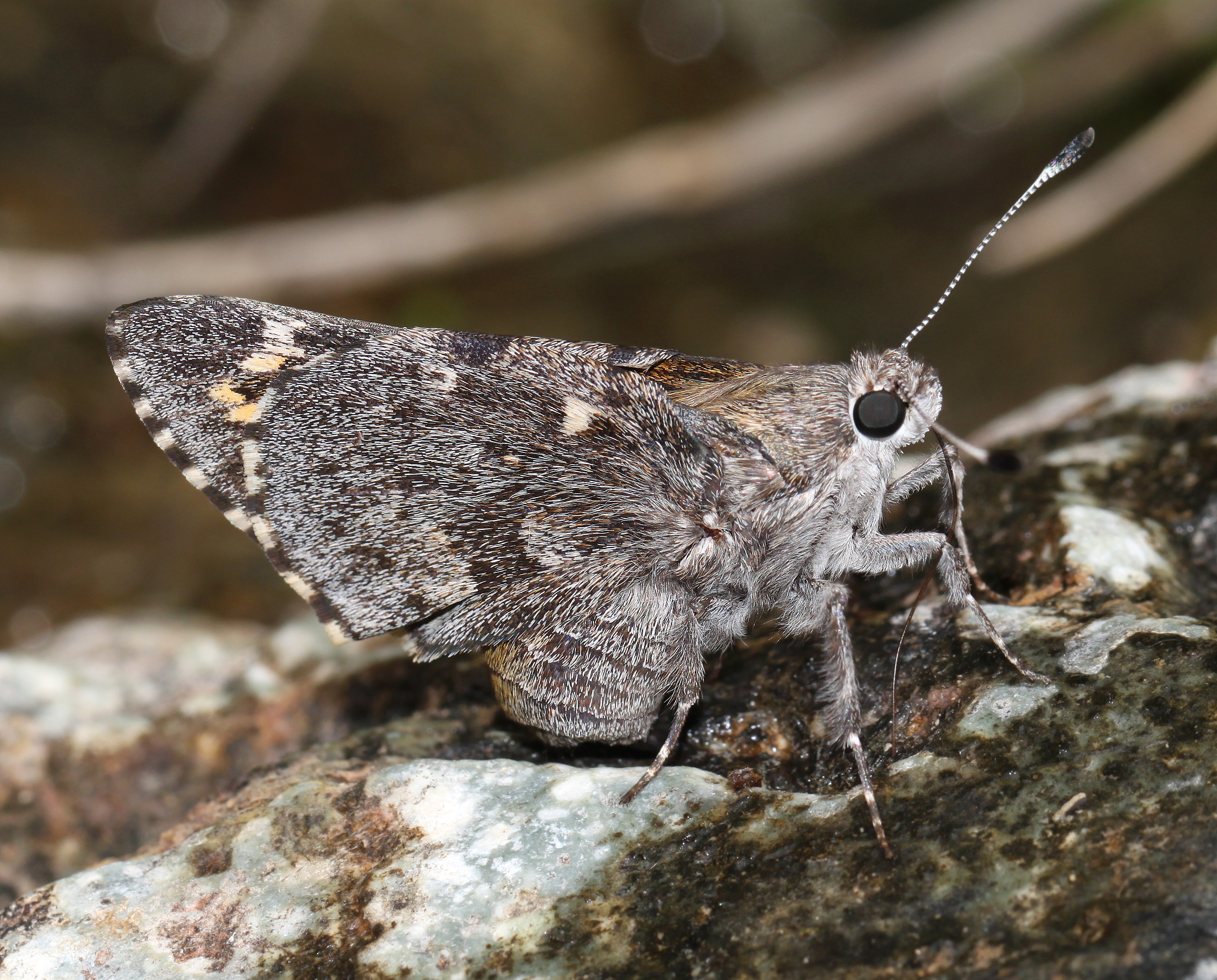

Scientific classification
- Kingdom: Animalia
- Phylum: Arthropoda
- Class: Insecta
- Order: Lepidoptera
- Family: Hesperiidae
- Genus: Agathymus
- Species: A. aryxna

Binomial name
- Agathymus aryxna Dyar, 1905

Synonyms
- Megathymus drucei Skinner, 1911

= Agathymus aryxna =

Species of butterfly

Agathymus aryxna, the Arizona giant skipper, is a butterfly in the family Hesperiidae described by Harrison Gray Dyar Jr. in 1905. Its range includes Central and North America.

The MONA or Hodges number for Agathymus aryxna is 4132.
