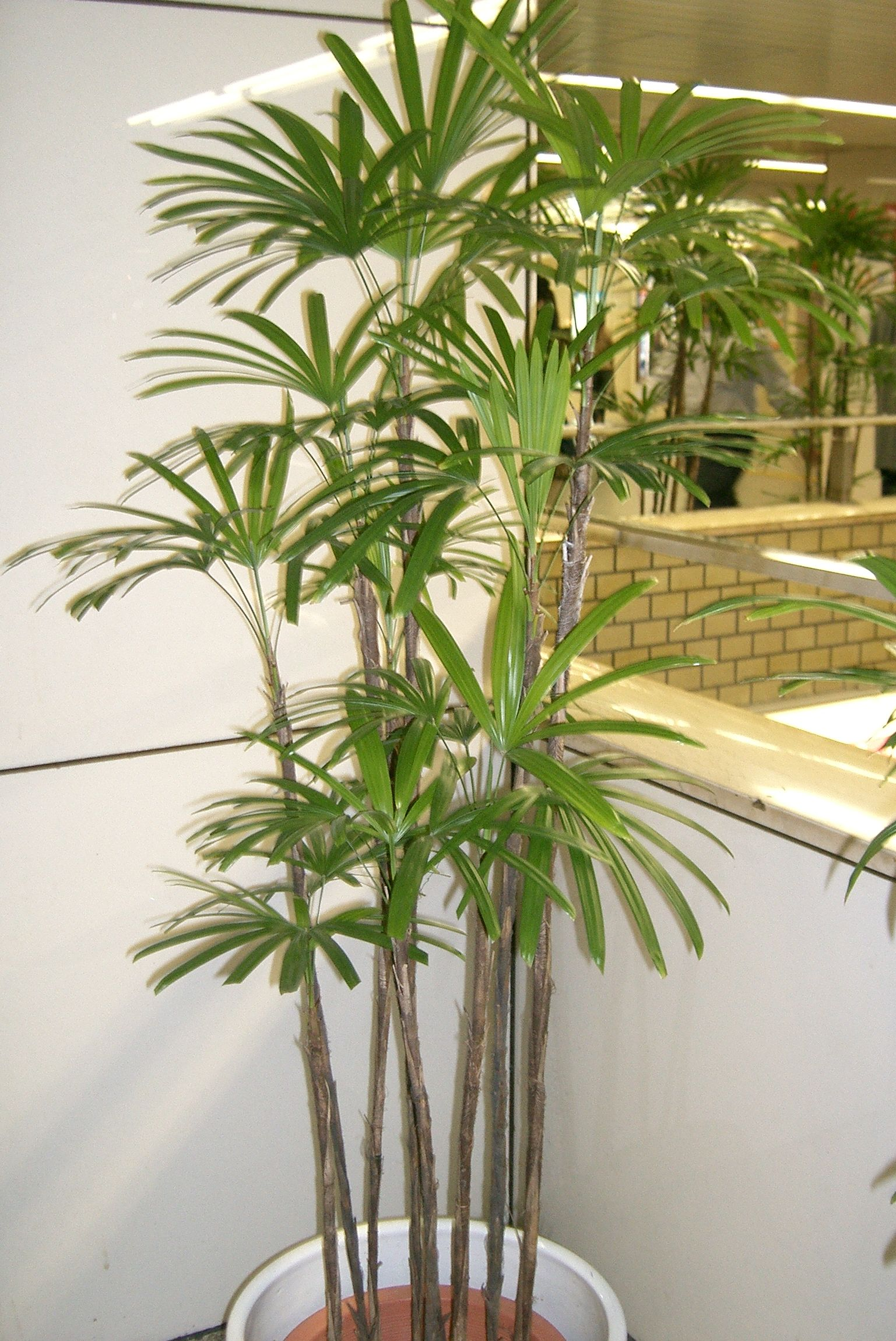
- Rhapis humilis

Scientific classification
- Kingdom: Plantae
- Clade: Tracheophytes
- Clade: Angiosperms
- Clade: Monocots
- Clade: Commelinids
- Order: Arecales
- Family: Arecaceae
- Subfamily: Coryphoideae
- Tribe: Trachycarpeae
- Genus: Rhapis; L.f. ex Aiton

Type species
- Rhapis excelsa

= Rhapis =

Lady palms

Genus of palms

Rhapis is a genus of about 10 species of small palms native to southeastern Asia from southern Japan and southern China south to Sumatra. The species are commonly known as lady palms. They are fan palms (subfamily Coryphoideae), with the leaves with a bare petiole terminating in a rounded fan of numerous leaflets. The plants have thin stems growing to 3–4 m tall, branching at the base, forming clumps and are dioecious, with male and female flowers produced on separate plants.

Image	Species	Distribution
	Rhapis cochinchinensis (Lour.) Mart.	Thailand; Laos; Vietnam
	Rhapis excelsa (Thunb.) A.Henry	China: Fujian, Guangdong, Guizhou, Hainan, Yunnan; Vietnam; naturalized in Thailand; Japan: Ryukyu Islands
	Rhapis gracilis Burret	China: Guangdong, Guangxi, Hainan; Vietnam
	Rhapis humilis Blume	China: Guangxi, Guizhou; Vietnam; naturalized in Japan and Java
	Rhapis micrantha Becc.	Laos; Vietnam
	Rhapis multifida Burret	China: Guangxi, Yunnan
	Rhapis puhuongensis M.S.Trudgen, T.P.Anh & A.J.Hend.	Vietnam
	Rhapis robusta Burret	China: Guangxi; Vietnam
	Rhapis subtilis Becc.	Thailand; Laos; Cambodia; Indonesia: Sumatra
	Rhapis vidalii Aver., T.H.Nguyên & P.K.Lôc	Vietnam

== Cultivation and uses ==
Several species are cultivated as ornamental plants, of which Rhapis excelsa is the most common. Rhapis excelsa and some other species are relatively cold tolerant and can be grown outdoors in subtropical or warm temperate climates. Rhapis excelsa was listed by NASA as one of the best plants for removing toxins from the air.
