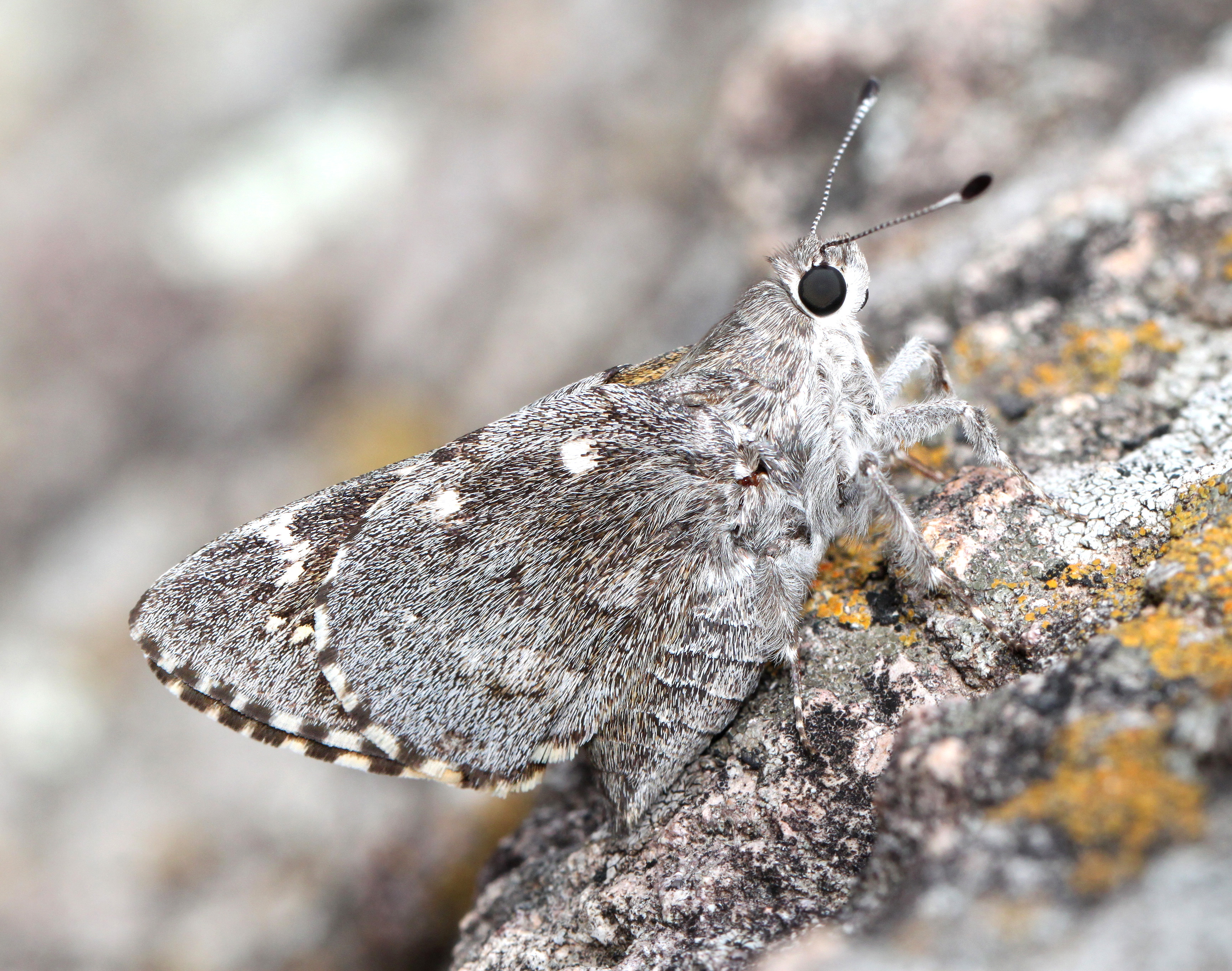
- Agathymus aryxna

Scientific classification
- Kingdom: Animalia
- Phylum: Arthropoda
- Clade: Pancrustacea
- Class: Insecta
- Order: Lepidoptera
- Family: Hesperiidae
- Subfamily: Hesperiinae
- Tribe: Megathymini; J. H. Comstock and A. Comstock, 1895

Genera
- See text

Synonyms
- Aegialini Stallings & Turner, 1958; Agathymini Stallings & Turner, 1959

= Giant skipper =

Giant-skippers

Subfamily of butterflies

The giant-skippers (Megathymini) are a tribe of butterflies in the family Hesperiidae.

== Taxonomy ==
Formerly, some authorities have classified the tribe as the disputed subfamily Megathyminae, but more modern classifications have placed it within the subfamily Hesperiinae. The tribe Megathymini includes five genera and about eighteen species. These butterflies typically live in desert areas of the south-western United States and Mexico.

== Biology ==
The giant-skippers are larger than the other members of the family Hesperiidae, but are medium-sized butterflies with thick bodies. They tend to be brown with yellow markings. The antennae are unhooked and some species even possess a short apiculus. Long hairlike scales are present on the upperwings of males. Their flight is fast and rapid. Males are territorial and tend to perch on low vegetation. Adults do not derive sustenance from flowers and rarely feed. Males do visit wet sand in order to drink.

The eggs of members of the genera Megathymus and Stallingsia are glued to leaves, while the eggs of Agathymus species are dumped into host plant clumps. The caterpillars of the giant-skippers bury themselves into the leaf or stem of a plant and feed from within the silk-lined tunnels they create. Pupae are formed in these tunnels.

== Genera ==
The tribe of includes the following genera:

- Agathymus
- Carystoides Godman, 1901
- Megathymus
- Stallingsia
