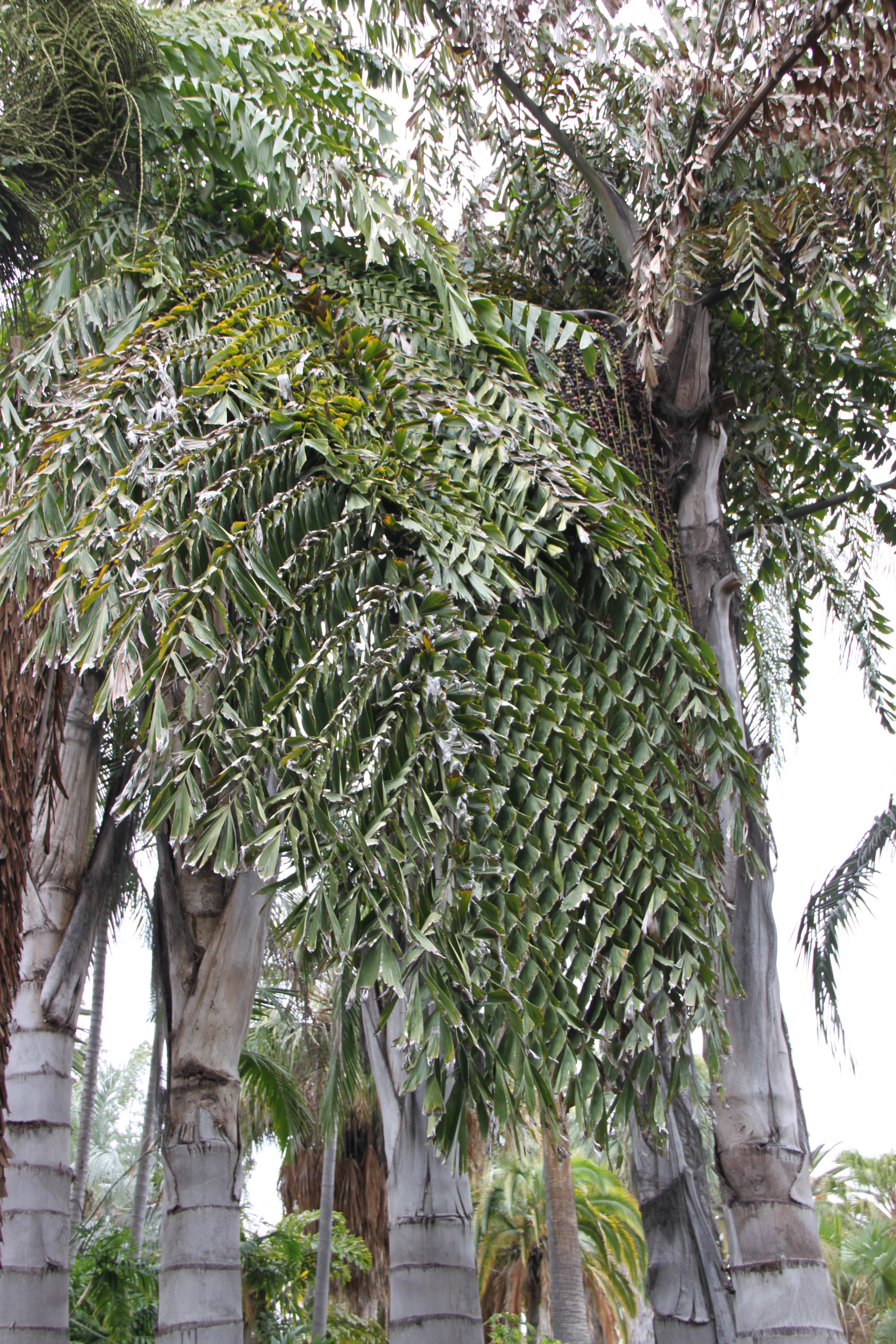
- Caryota obtusa at the Huntington Library

Scientific classification
- Kingdom: Plantae
- Clade: Tracheophytes
- Clade: Angiosperms
- Clade: Monocots
- Clade: Commelinids
- Order: Arecales
- Family: Arecaceae
- Subfamily: Coryphoideae
- Tribe: Caryoteae; Scheff.

Type genus
- Caryota L.

Genera
- Arenga Labill. Caryota L. Wallichia Roxb.

= Caryoteae =

Tribe of plants

Caryoteae is a tribe within the palm family Arecaceae, distributed across Southeast Asia, from southern India and Sri Lanka east to Vanuatu and northernmost Queensland, Australia. It was historically classified under the subfamily Arecoideae due to its inflorescences, which resemble those of the tribe Iriarteeae, and its flowers arranged in triads (with two male flowers and one central female flower), a common trait in Arecoideae. However, phylogenetic studies based on DNA repeatedly link Caryoteae to subfamily Coryphoideae. Caryoteae do have leaves with induplicate folds, a feature found in most Coryphoid palms, but unlike most Coryphoideae, the leaves are pinnate (Arenga, Wallichia) or bipinnate (Caryota). Phoenix is the only other Coryphoid genus with induplicate, pinnate leaves.

== Genera ==
It contains three genera:

- Arenga
- Caryota
- Wallichia

== Gallery ==
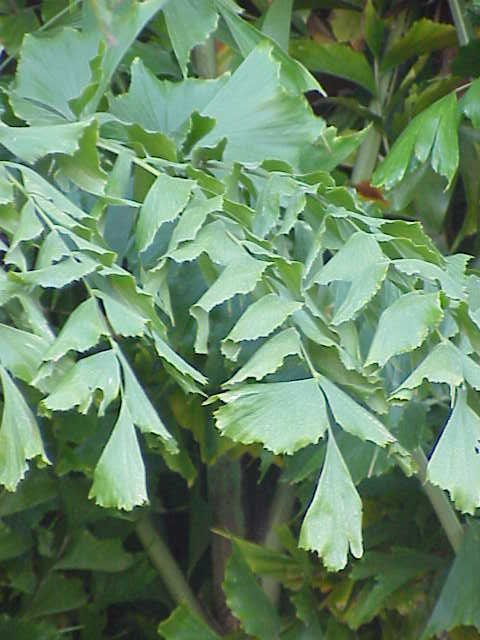
The bipinnate leaves of Caryota mitis

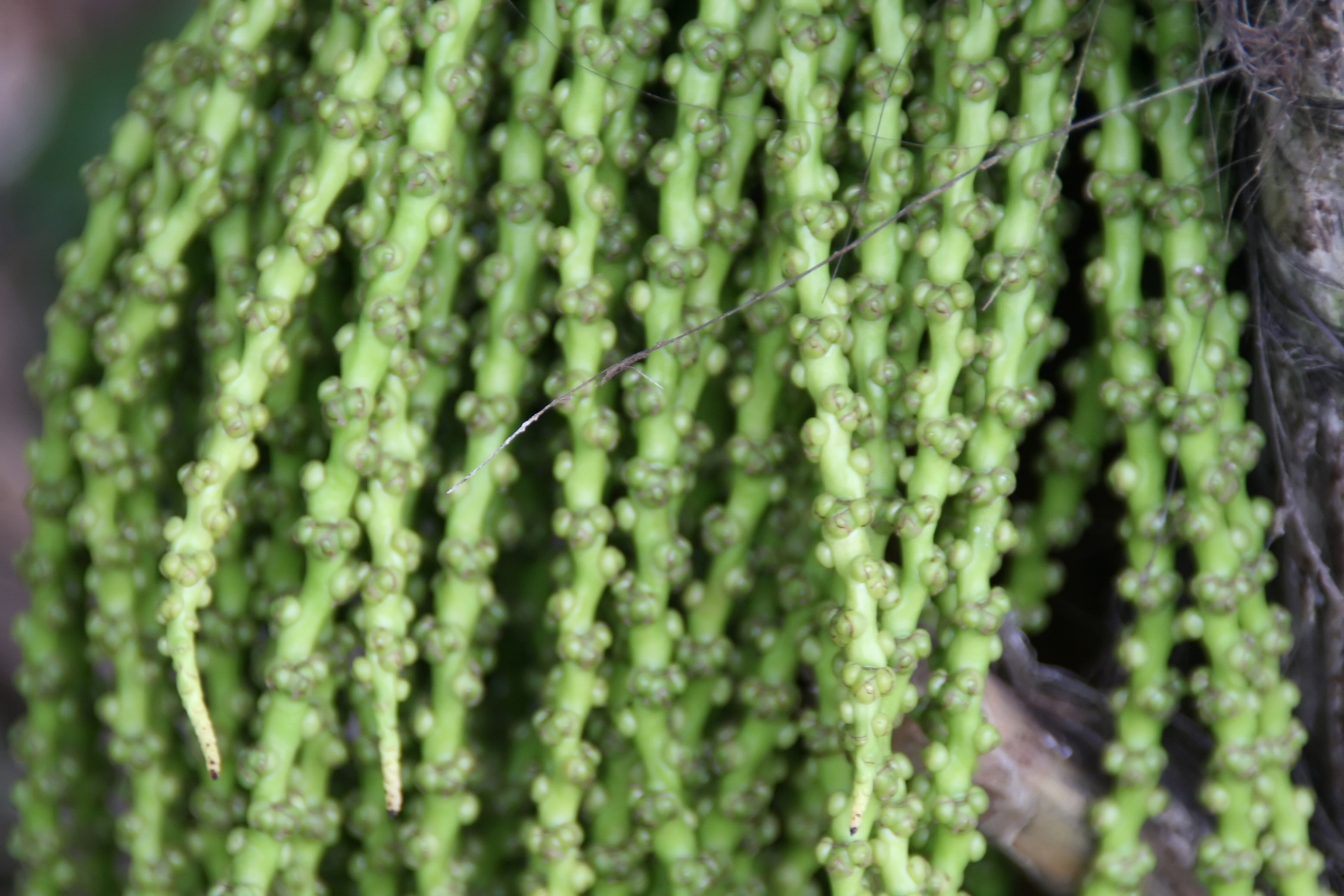
Caryota flowers are arranged in triads

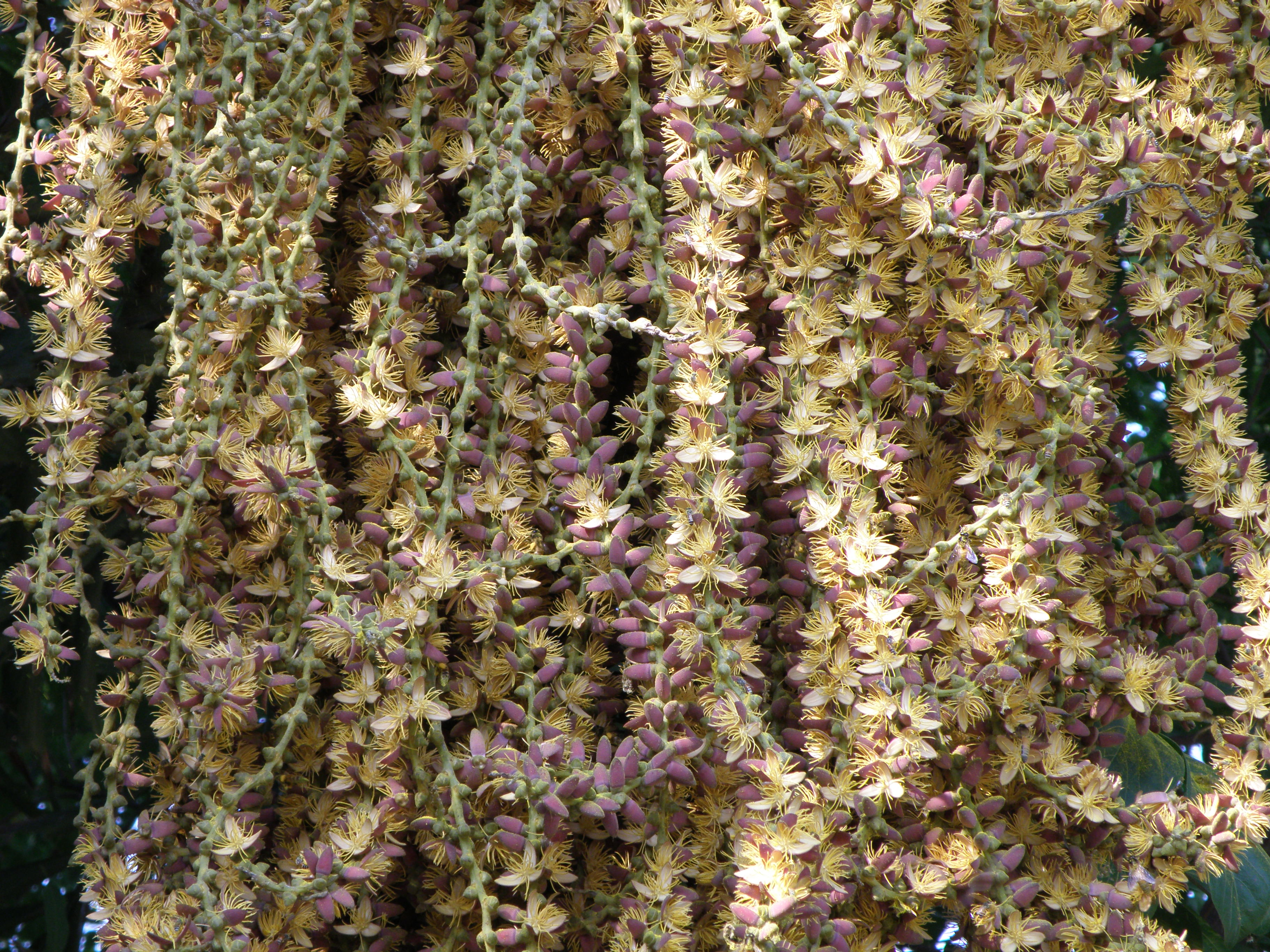
Caryota urens flowers at anthesis

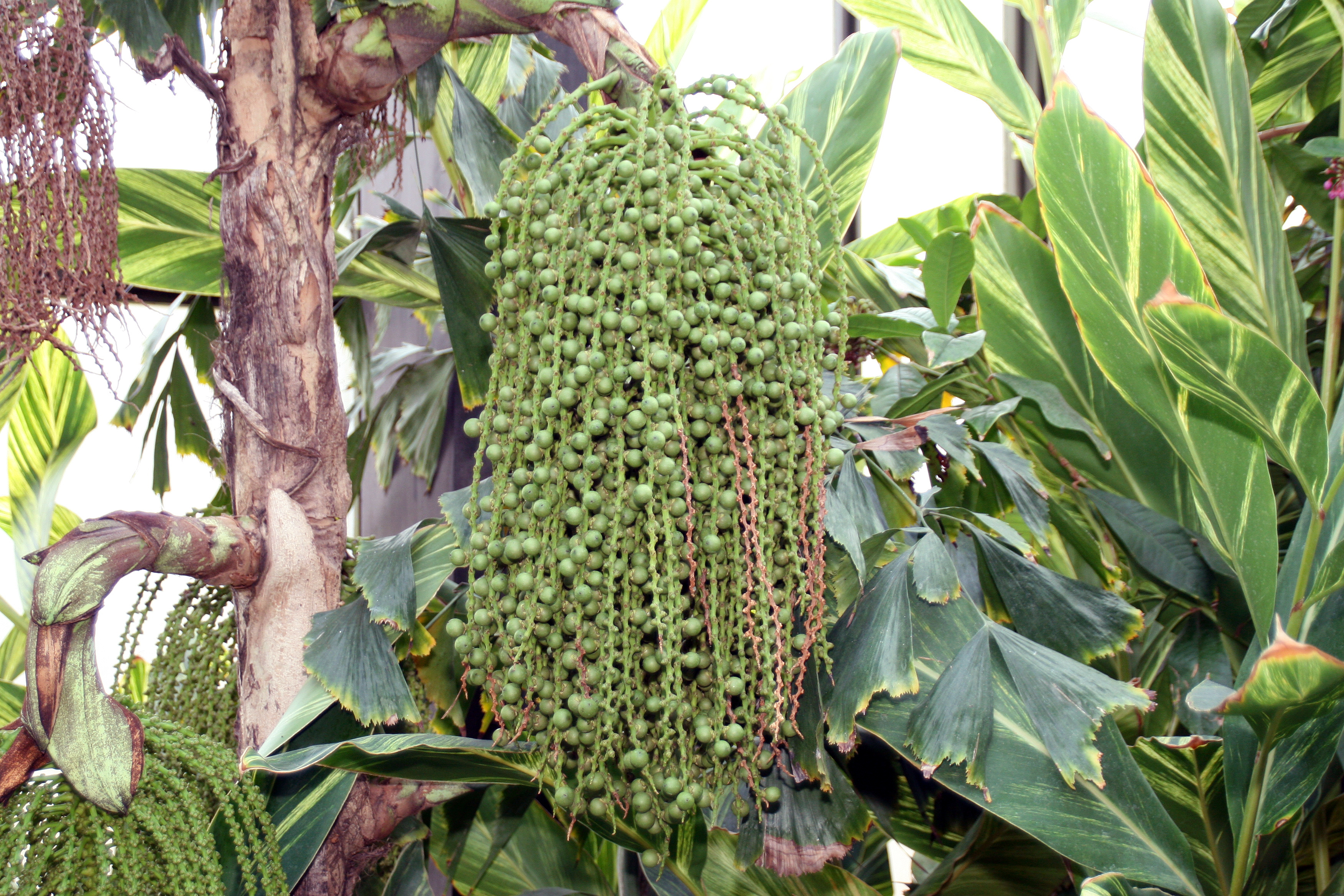
The fruits of Caryota mitis

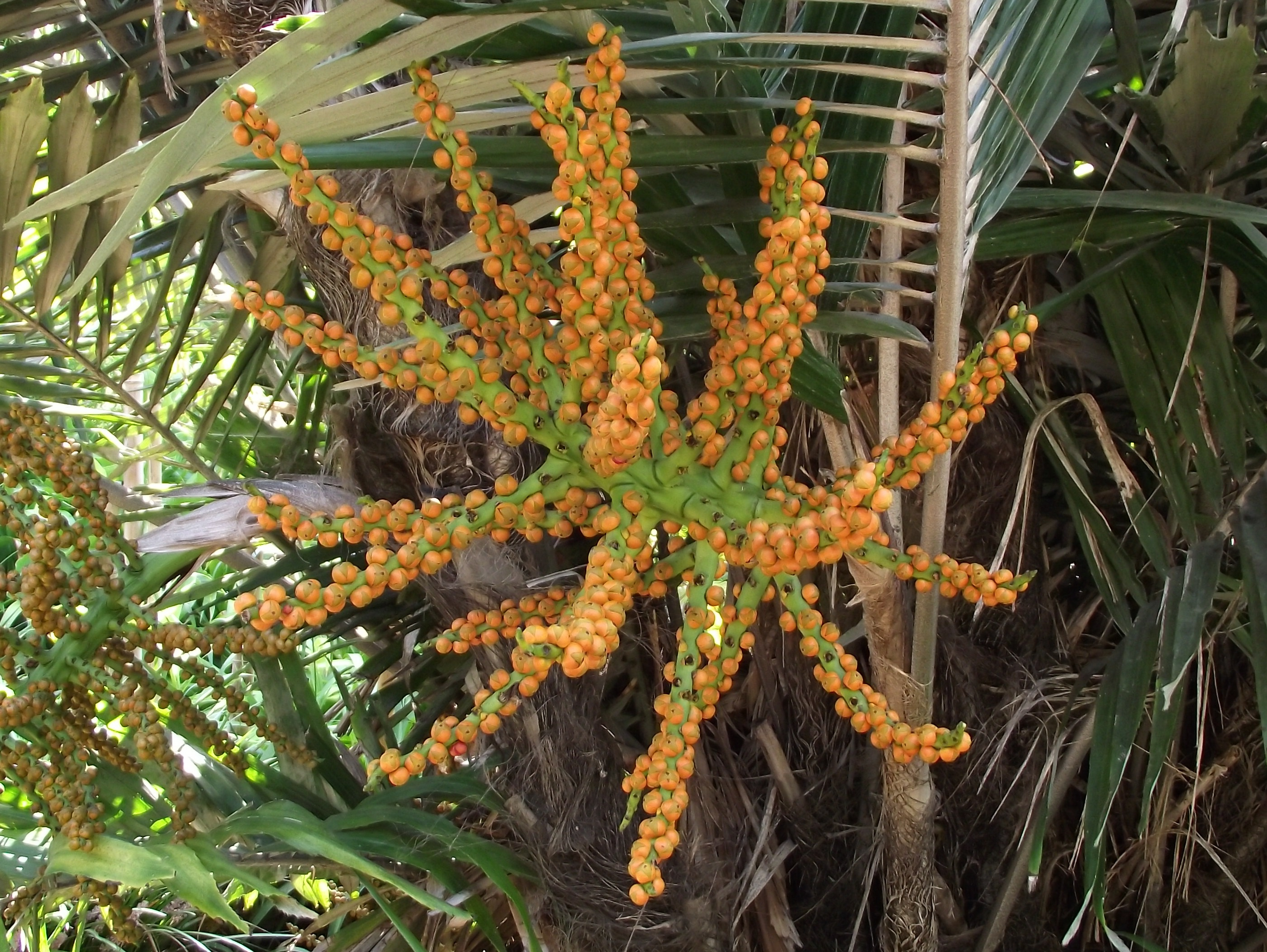
Fruits of Arenga engleri

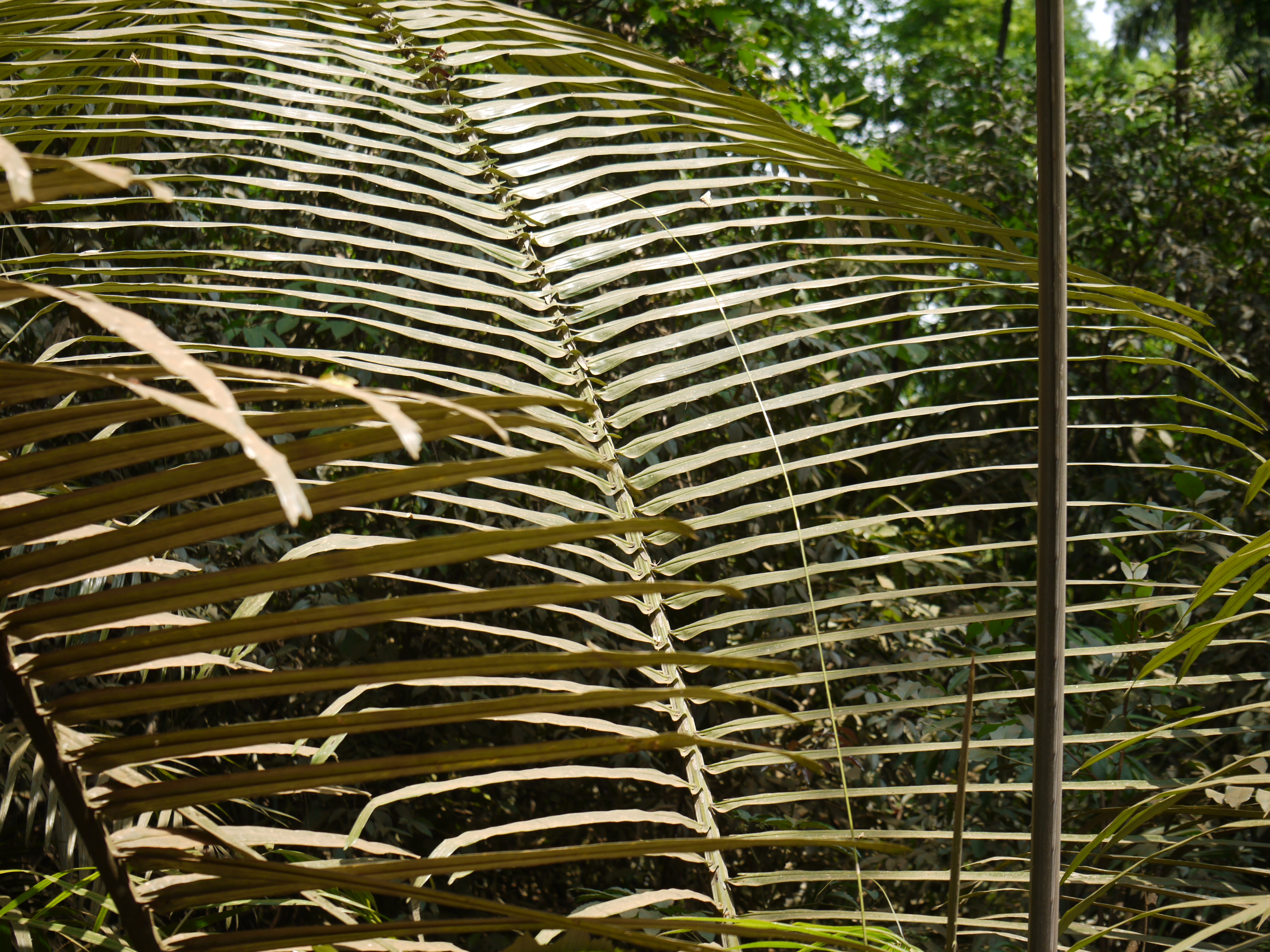
Arenga leaves are pinnate

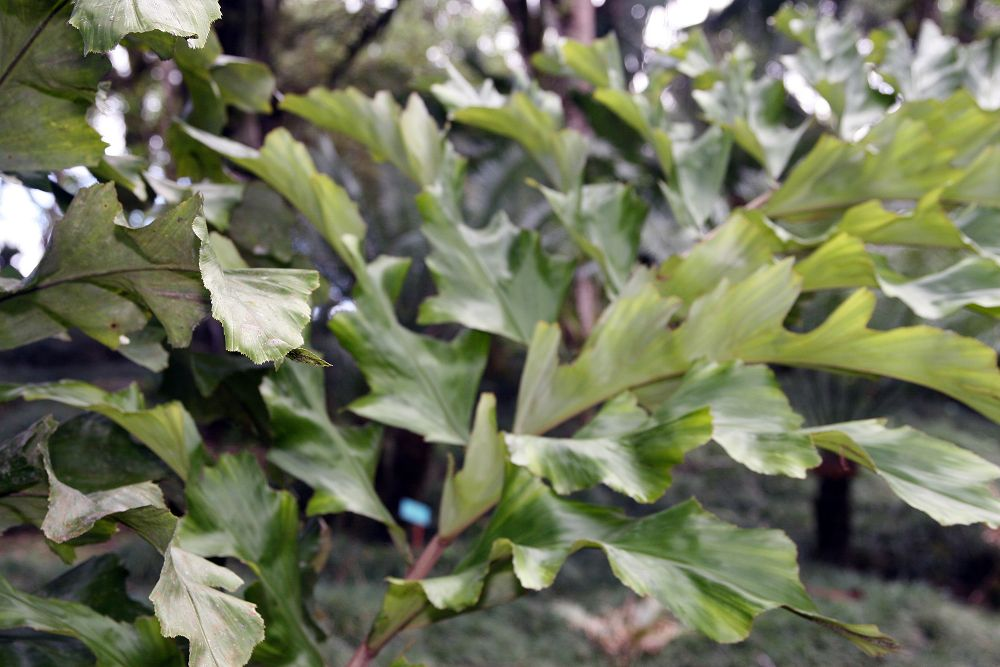
Leaves of Arenga undulatifolia - note the praemorse margins

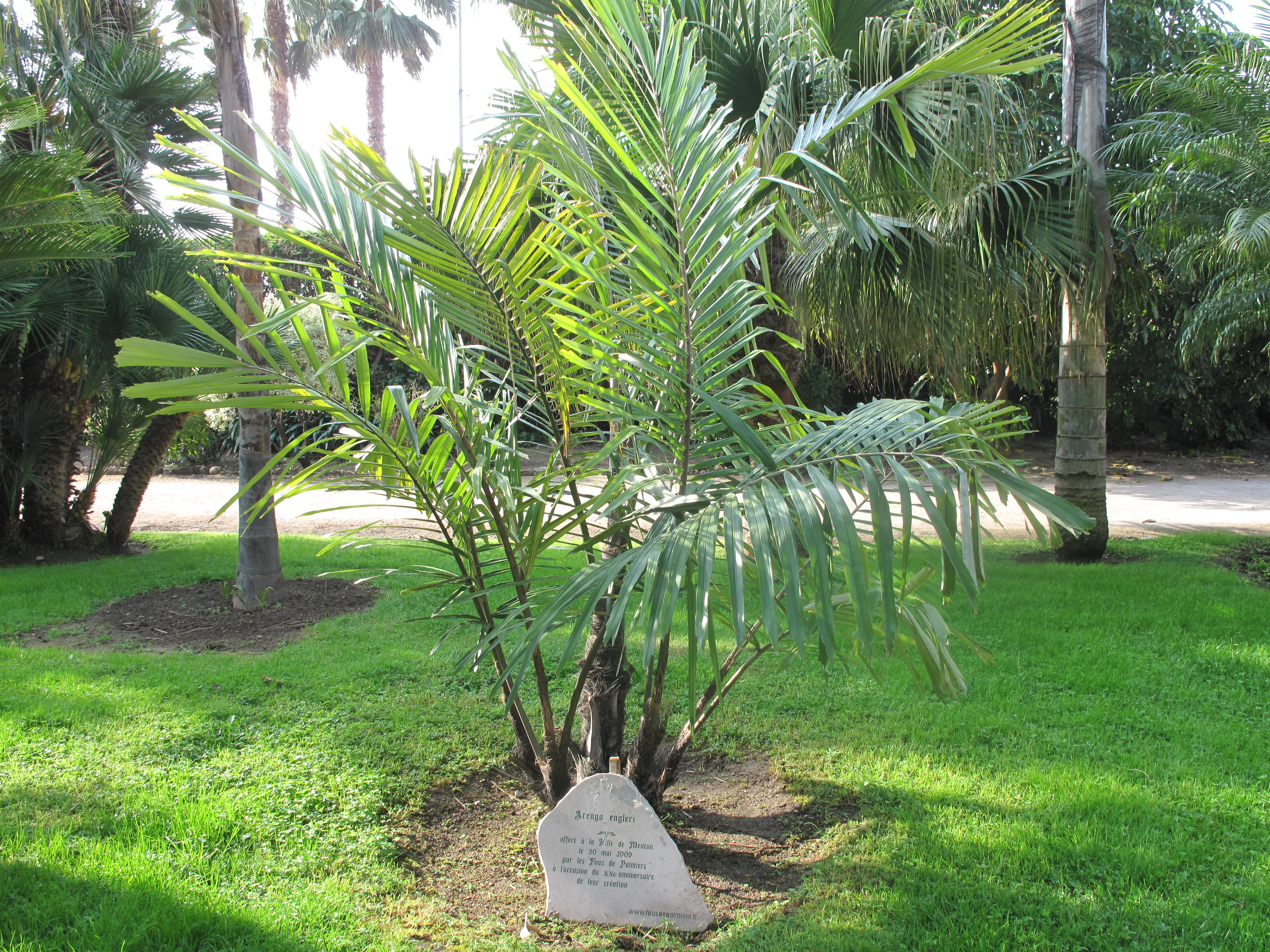
Young specimen of Arenga engleri

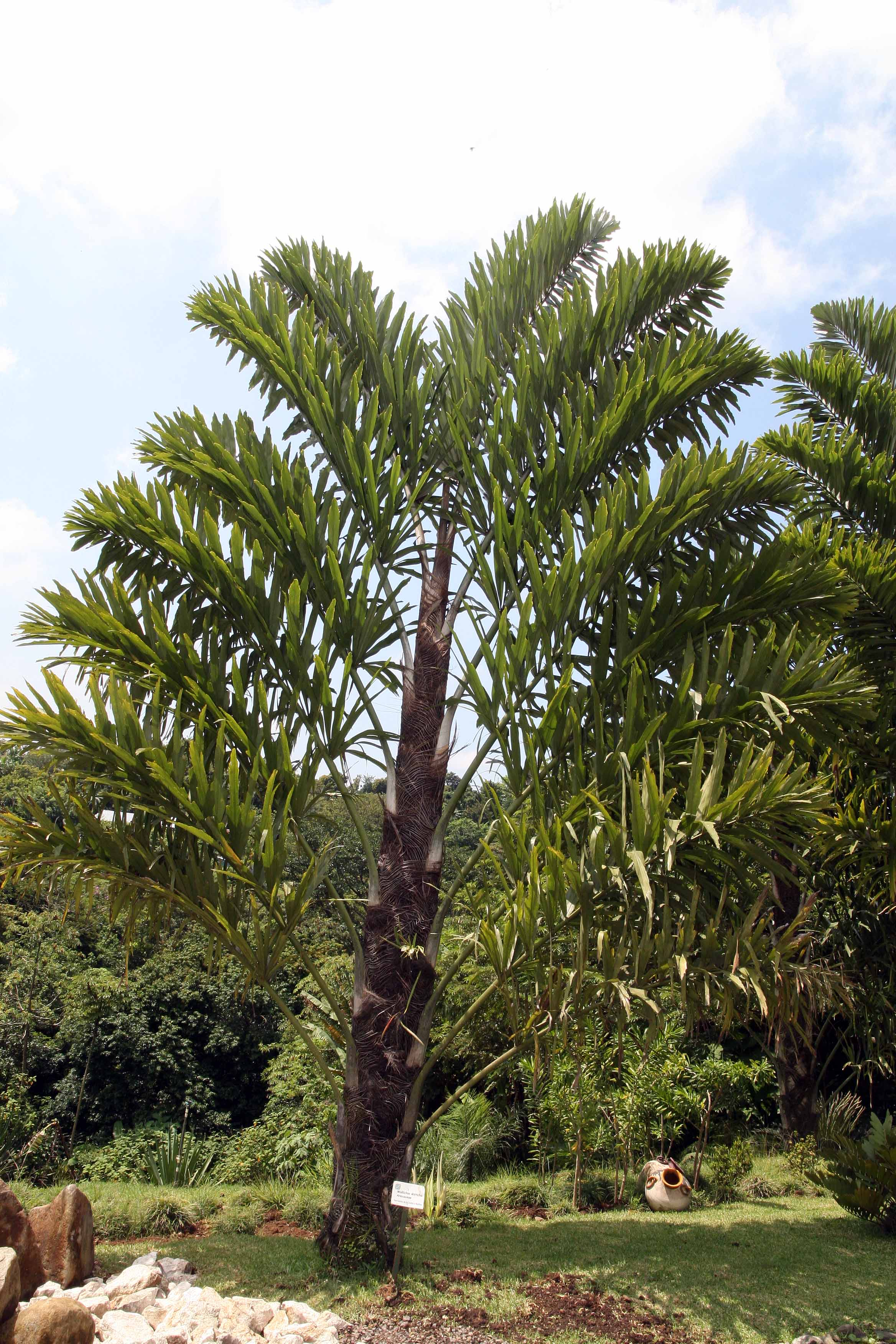
Wallichia disticha leaves are arranged in two ranks

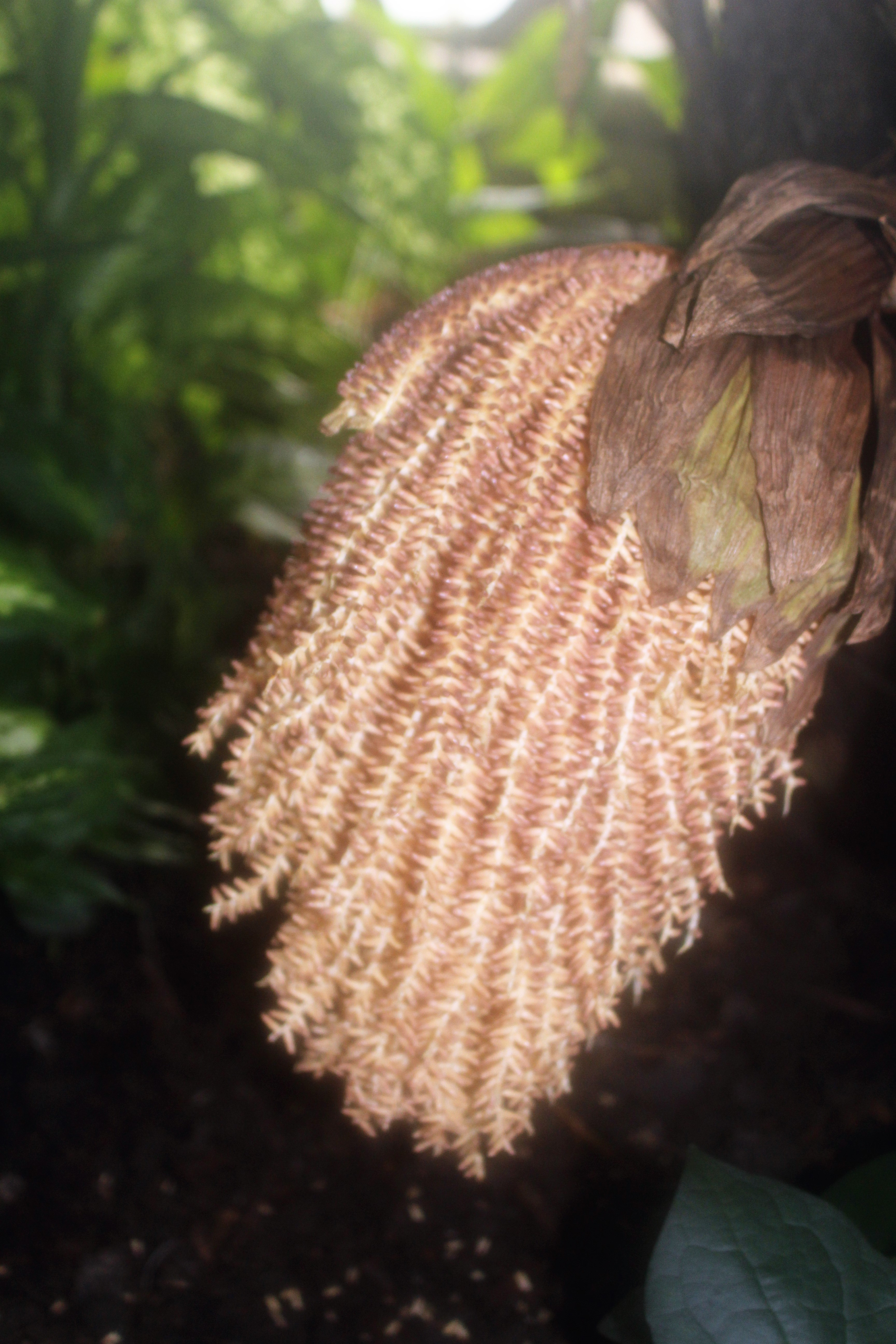
The flowers of Wallichia oblongifolia
