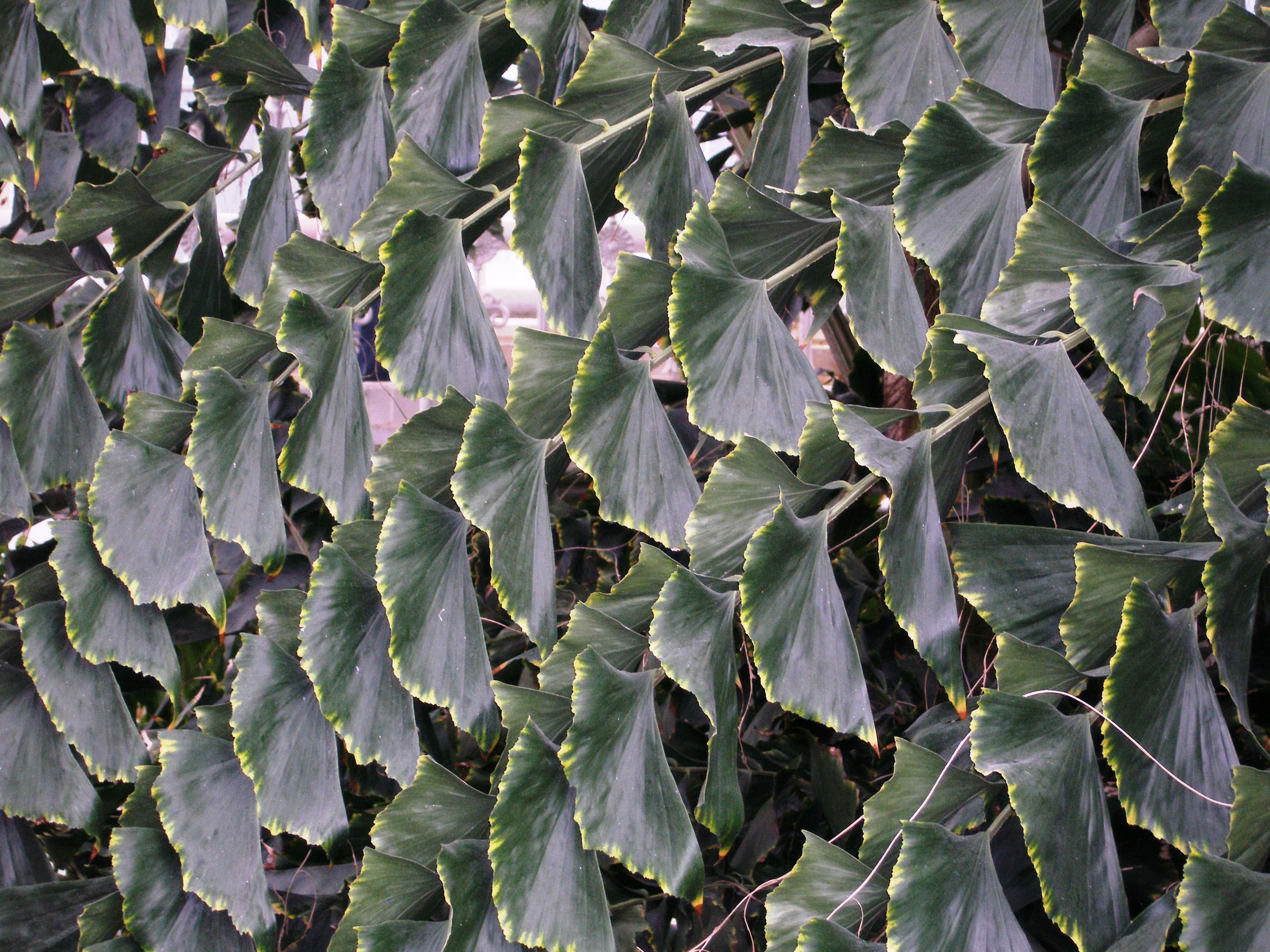

Conservation status
- Least Concern (IUCN 3.1)

Scientific classification
- Kingdom: Plantae
- Clade: Tracheophytes
- Clade: Angiosperms
- Clade: Monocots
- Clade: Commelinids
- Order: Arecales
- Family: Arecaceae
- Genus: Caryota
- Species: C. no

Binomial name
- Caryota no Becc. 1871

Synonyms
- Caryota nó Becc. 1871; Caryota rumphiana var. borneensis Becc.

= Caryota no =

Species of palm

Caryota no is a species of flowering plant in the family Arecaceae. It is endemic to the Island of Borneo. Its specific epithet is from the common name in Malaysian, cajù nó. It is called baroch by the Dayak people of Singhi. The fibers, which are used for fishing lines or woven into baskets, are called talì onus. The extremely hard wood is also used like similar species.
