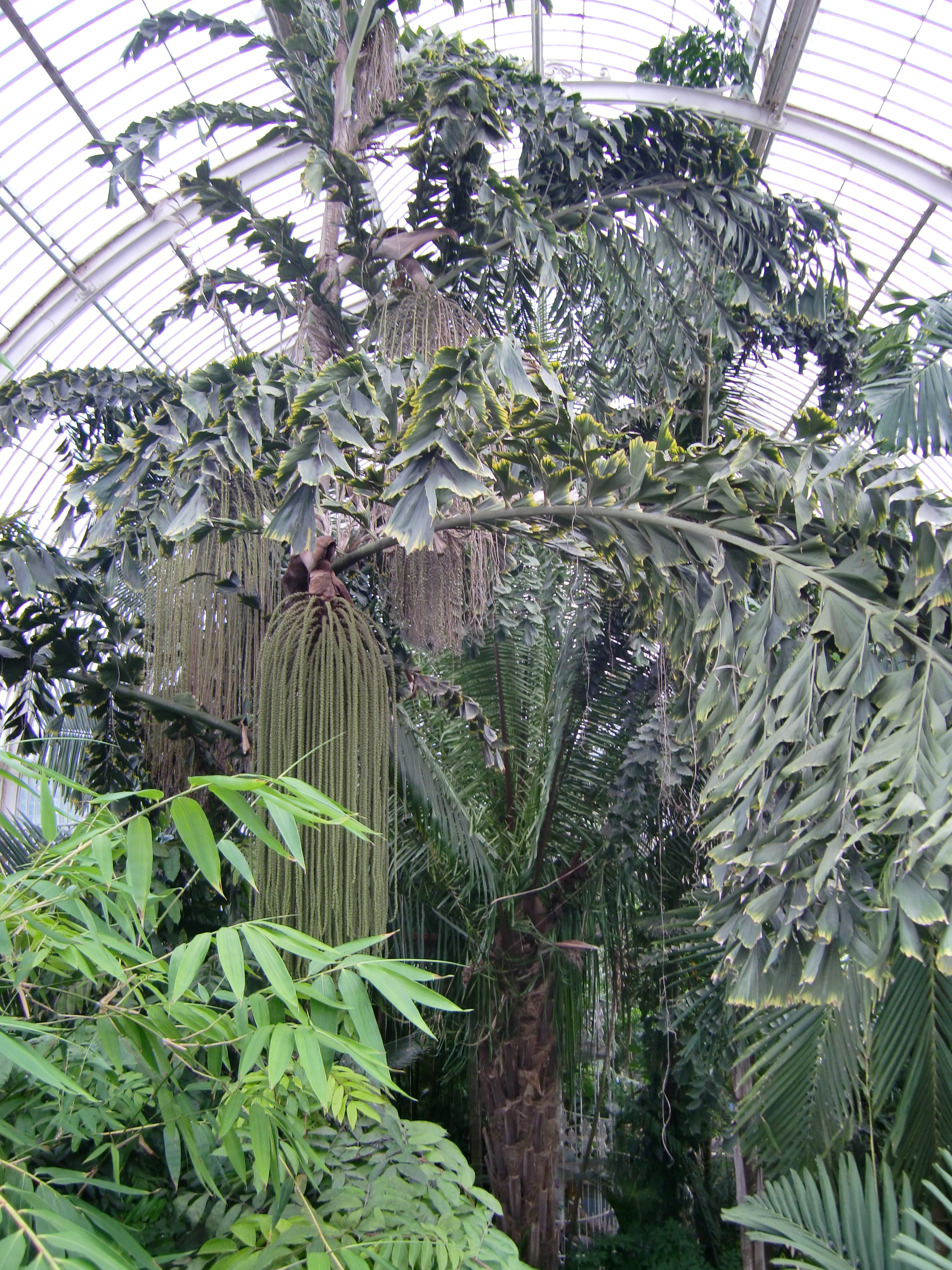

Scientific classification
- Kingdom: Plantae
- Clade: Tracheophytes
- Clade: Angiosperms
- Clade: Monocots
- Clade: Commelinids
- Order: Arecales
- Family: Arecaceae
- Genus: Caryota
- Species: C. rumphiana

Binomial name
- Caryota rumphiana Mart.

Synonyms
- Caryota rumphiana var. moluccana Becc.; Caryota rumphiana var. papuana Becc.

= Caryota rumphiana =

Species of palm

Caryota rumphiana, whose common names include the fishtail or Albert palm, is a Caryota or fish tail palm (Family Palmae or Arecaceae). It is native to Philippines, Sulawesi, Maluku, New Guinea, Solomon Islands, Bismarck Archipelago. Its leaves have a distinctive fishtail shape and its flowers have been described as mop-like. It is monocarpic. These leaves are bipinnate with as many as 1,800 fan-shaped or wedge-shaped leaflets, each up to 15 inches (38 centimeters) long by six inches (15 cm) wide.
