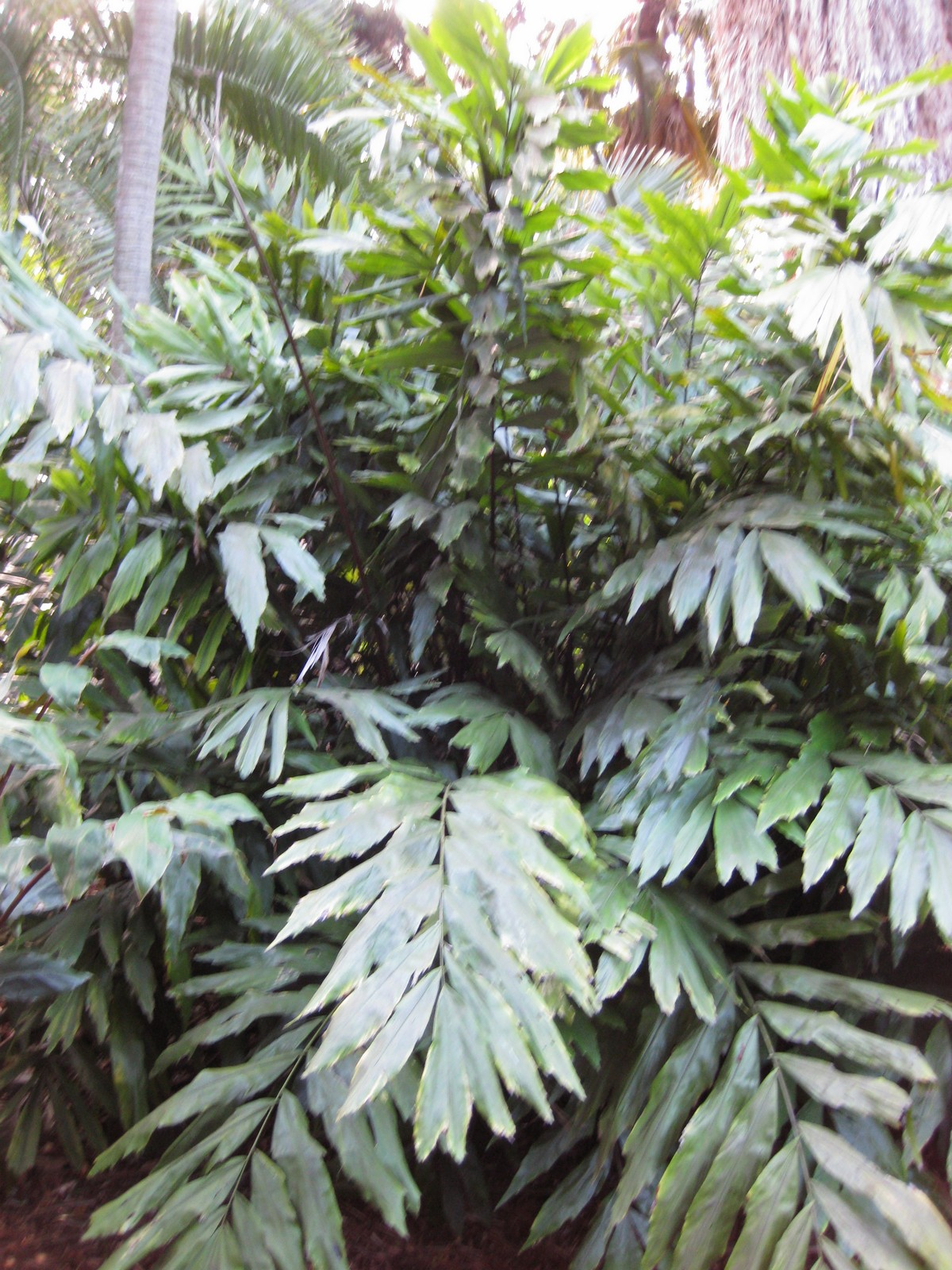
- Wallichia densiflora

Scientific classification
- Kingdom: Plantae
- Clade: Tracheophytes
- Clade: Angiosperms
- Clade: Monocots
- Clade: Commelinids
- Order: Arecales
- Family: Arecaceae
- Subfamily: Coryphoideae
- Tribe: Caryoteae
- Genus: Wallichia; Roxb.

Type species
- Wallichia caryotoides

Synonyms
- Harina Buch.-Ham.; Wrightea Roxb.; Asraoa J.Joseph

= Wallichia =

Genus of palms

Wallichia is a genus of eight species of flowering plant in the family Arecaceae. In 2016, it was proposed that its species should be included within the genus Arenga, but as of April 2024 this was not accepted by Plants of the World Online.

== Species ==
The genus is distributed in the Eastern Himalayas, northern Indochina, and southern China.

Image	Scientific name	Distribution
	Wallichia caryotoides Roxb.	Bangladesh, China: Yunnan, Myanmar, Thailand
	Wallichia disticha T.Anderson	Bangladesh, Bhutan, India: Arunachal Pradesh, Assam, China: Yunnan, Myanmar, Thailand, Laos
	Wallichia gracilis Becc.	China: Guangxi, Yunnan, Vietnam
	Wallichia lidiae A.J.Hend	Bago region of Myanmar
	Wallichia marianneae Hodel	Thailand
	Wallichia nana Griff	Bangladesh, Bhutan, India: Arunachal Pradesh, Assam
	Wallichia oblongifolia Griff.	Himalayas of northern and eastern India, Nepal, Bangladesh, Bhutan, China: Yunnan
	Wallichia triandra (J.Joseph) S.K.Basu.	India: Arunachal Pradesh, Tibet
