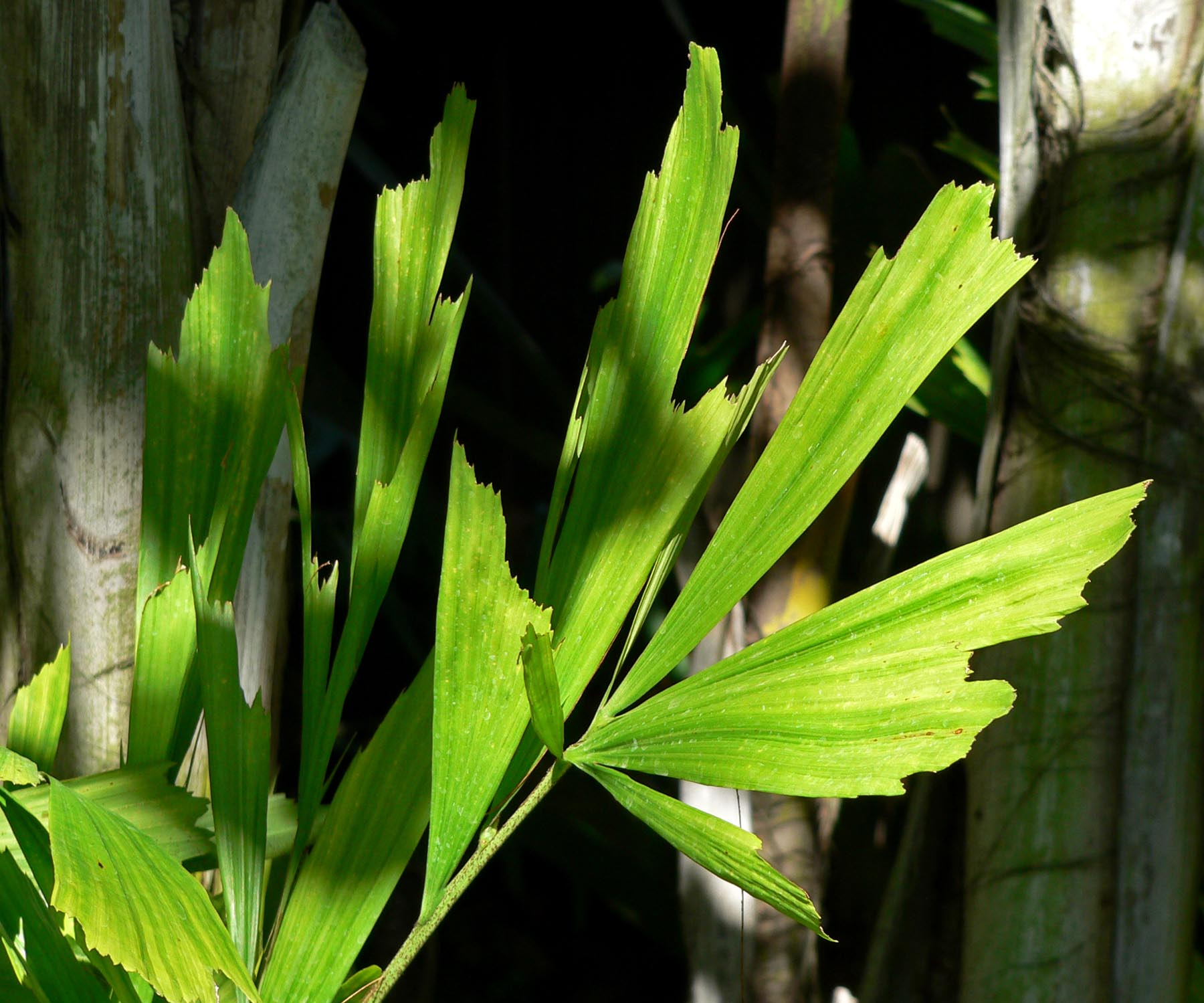
- Caryota mitis leaves

Scientific classification
- Kingdom: Plantae
- Clade: Embryophytes
- Clade: Tracheophytes
- Clade: Spermatophytes
- Clade: Angiosperms
- Clade: Monocots
- Clade: Commelinids
- Order: Arecales
- Family: Arecaceae
- Subfamily: Coryphoideae
- Tribe: Caryoteae
- Genus: Caryota; L.

Type species
- Caryota urens

Synonyms
- Schunda-Pana Adans.; Thuessinkia Korth. ex Miq

= Caryota =

Fishtail palms

Genus of palms

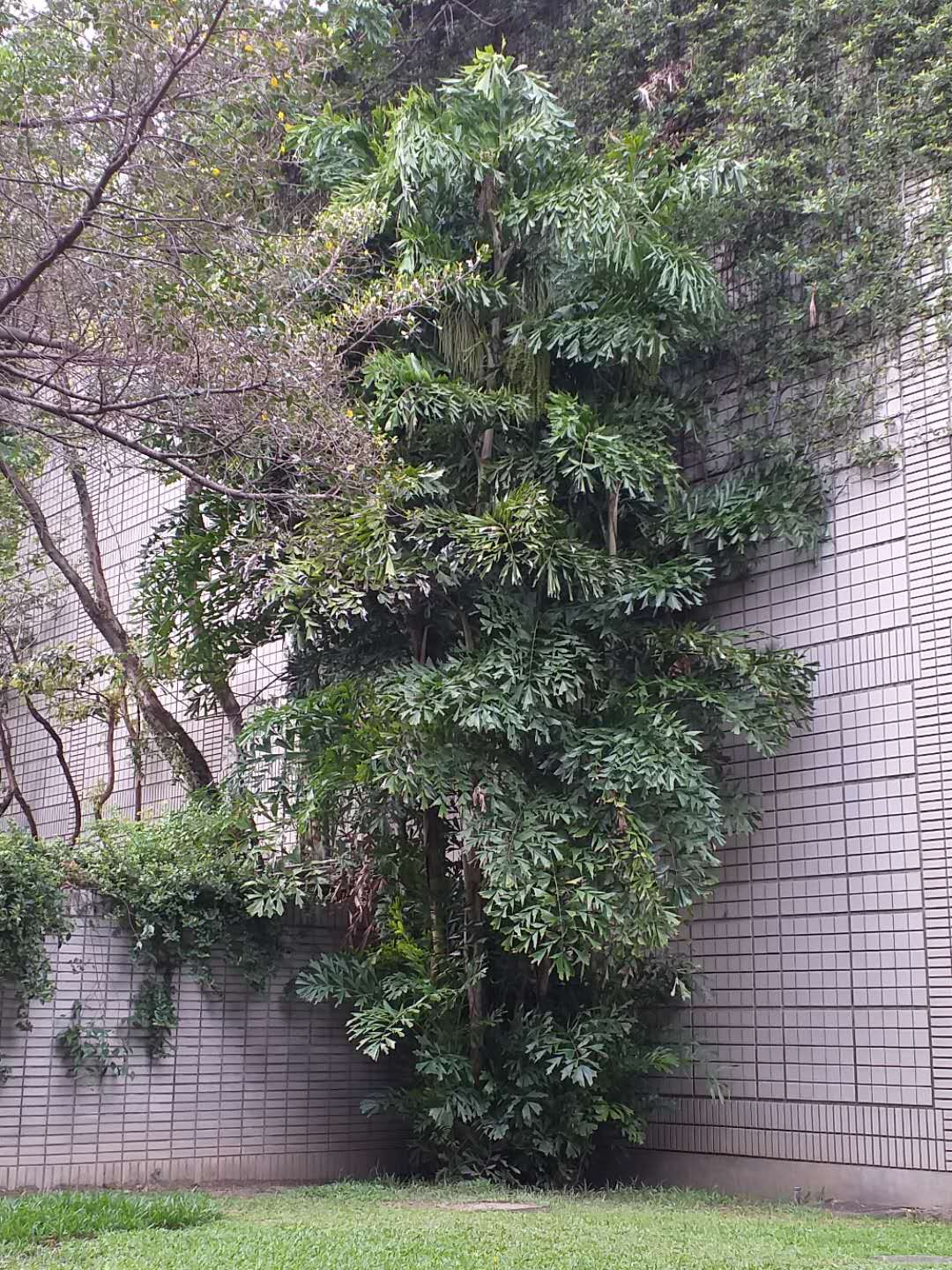
Caryota mitis

Caryota is a genus of palm trees. They are often known as fishtail palms because of the shape of their leaves.

As of May 2026, the genus comprises 14 accepted species, with a native distribution ranging from the Indian subcontinent and southern China, extending in a south-east direction to Queensland, Australia and Vanuatu.

One of the more widely known species is caryota obtusa, the flowers of which are used to make one type of jaggery (an unrefined sugar), and also to make palm wine. Caryota mitis is native to Indochina, but has become an invasive introduced species in the US state of Florida. They are also one of the few Arecaceae with bipinnate foliage. Many grow in mountainous areas and are adapted to warm mediterranean climates as well as subtropical and tropical climates.

Fishtail palms contain raphides.

== Species ==
Image	Scientific name	Distribution
	Caryota albertii F.Muell. ex H.Wendl.	Queensland
	Caryota angustifolia Zumaidar & Jeanson	Sulawesi
	Caryota cumingii Lodd. ex Mart.	Philippines fishtail palm - Philippines
	Caryota elegans Schaedtler	
	Caryota kiriwongensis Hodel	Thailand
	Caryota maxima Blume	Guangdong, Guangxi, Hainan, Yunnan, Bhutan, Assam, Arunachal Pradesh, Java, Sumatra, Laos, Malaysia, Myanmar, Thailand, Vietnam
	Caryota mitis Lour.	Burmese fishtail palm - Guangdong, Guangxi, Hainan, Borneo, Cambodia, India, Java, Sulawesi, Sumatra, Laos, Malaysia, Myanmar, Philippines, Singapore, Thailand, Vietnam
	Caryota monostachya Becc.	Vietnam, Guangxi, Guizhou, Yunnan
	Caryota no Becc.	Borneo
	Caryota obtusa Griff.	Thailand mountain palm - Bhutan, Assam, Arunachal Pradesh, Laos, Myanmar, Thailand
	Caryota ophiopellis Dowe	Vanuatu
	Caryota rumphiana Mart.	Albert palm - Philippines, Sulawesi, Maluku, New Guinea, Solomon Islands, Bismarck Archipelago
	Caryota sympetala Gagnep.	Vietnam, Laos, Cambodia
	Caryota urens L.	Southern India, Sri Lanka; naturalized in Assam, Bangladesh, Bonin Islands, Southern China, Nepal, Myanmar, Andaman Islands, Malaysia, Cuba, Hispaniola, Puerto Rico - jaggery palm, solitary fishtail palm, wine palm, toddy palm
	Caryota zebrina Hambali & al.	New Guinea

== Gallery ==
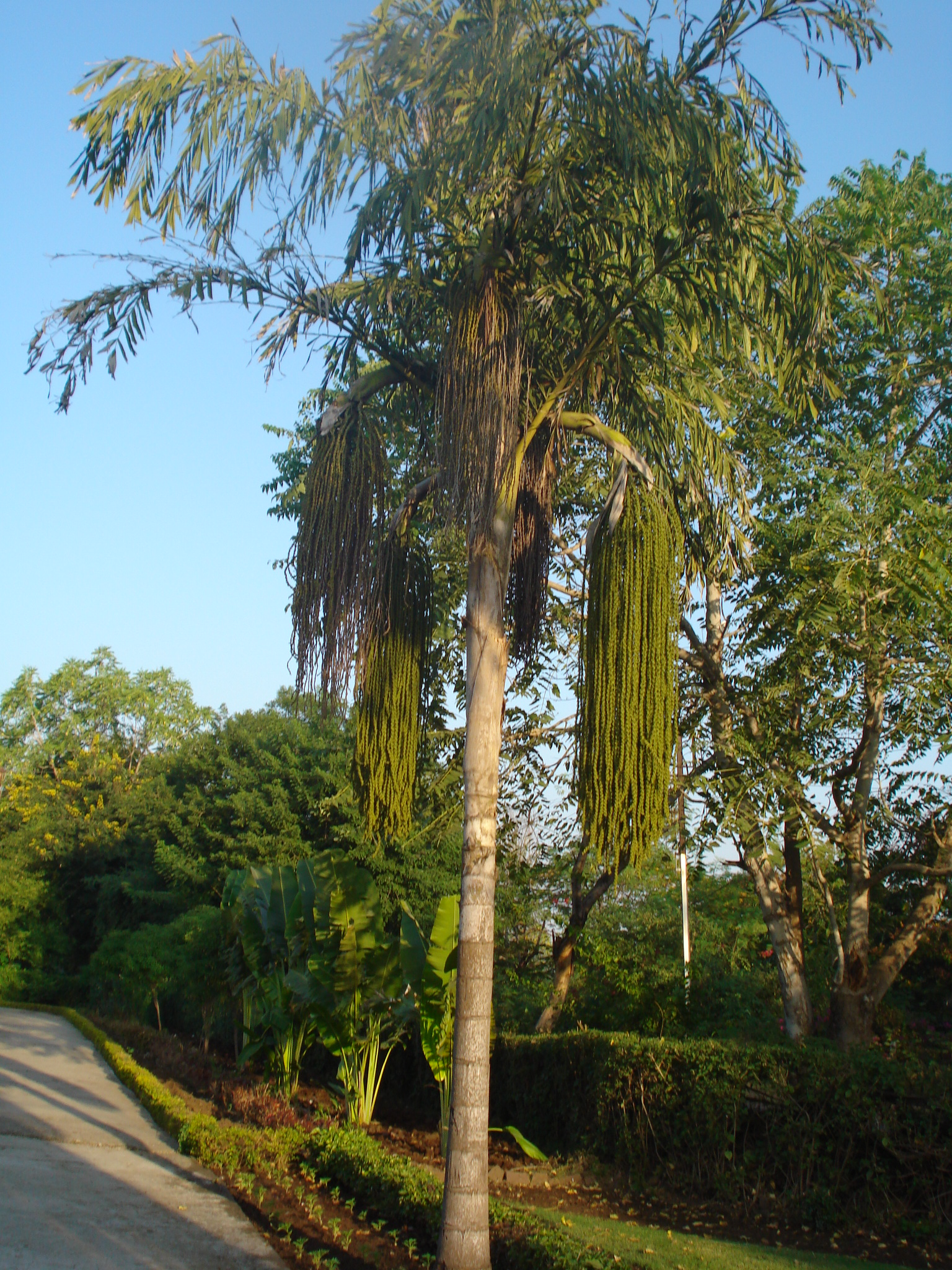
Fishtail palm at Bhopal

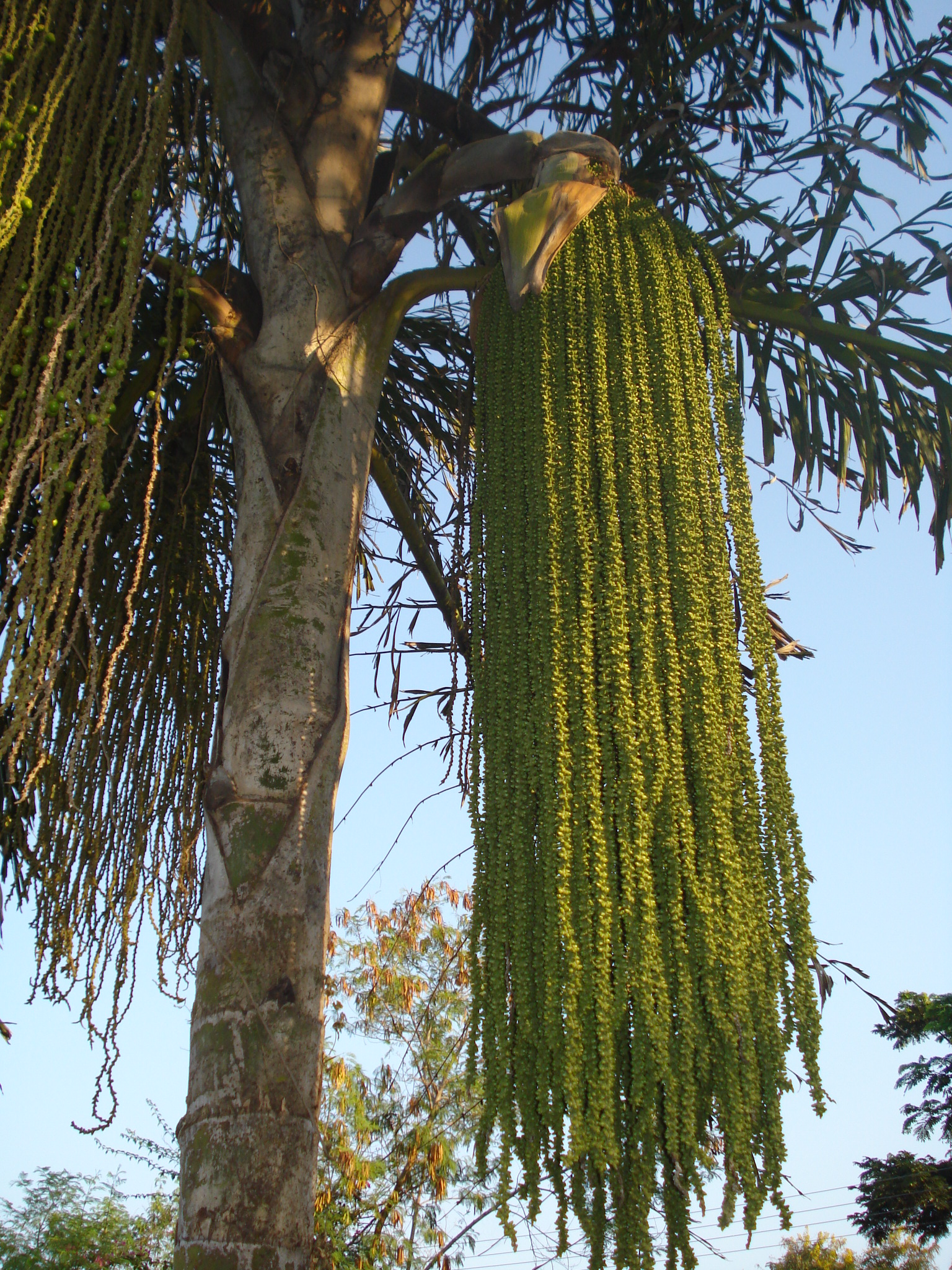
Fishtail palm at Bhopal

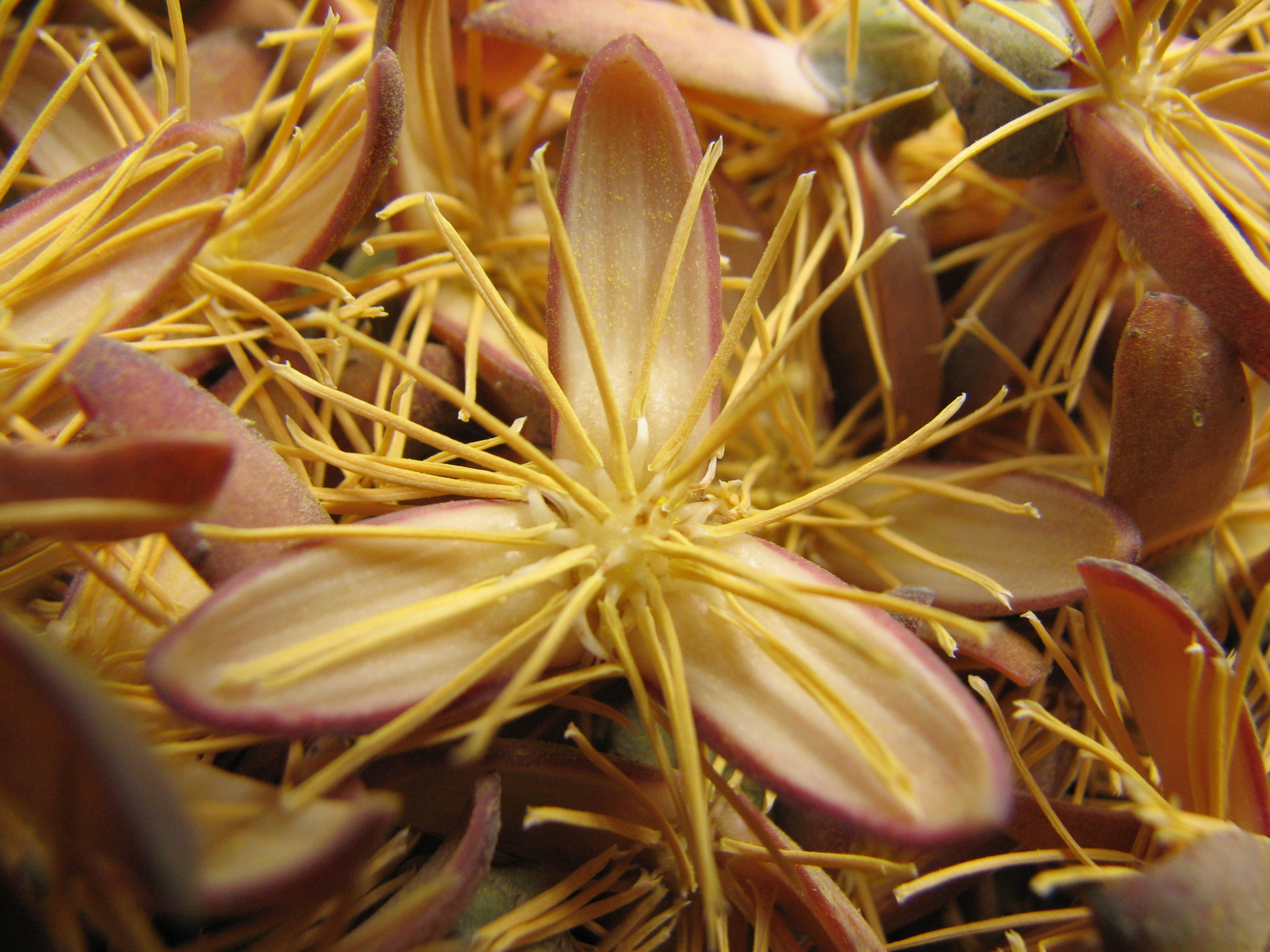
Fishtail palm flower in detail.

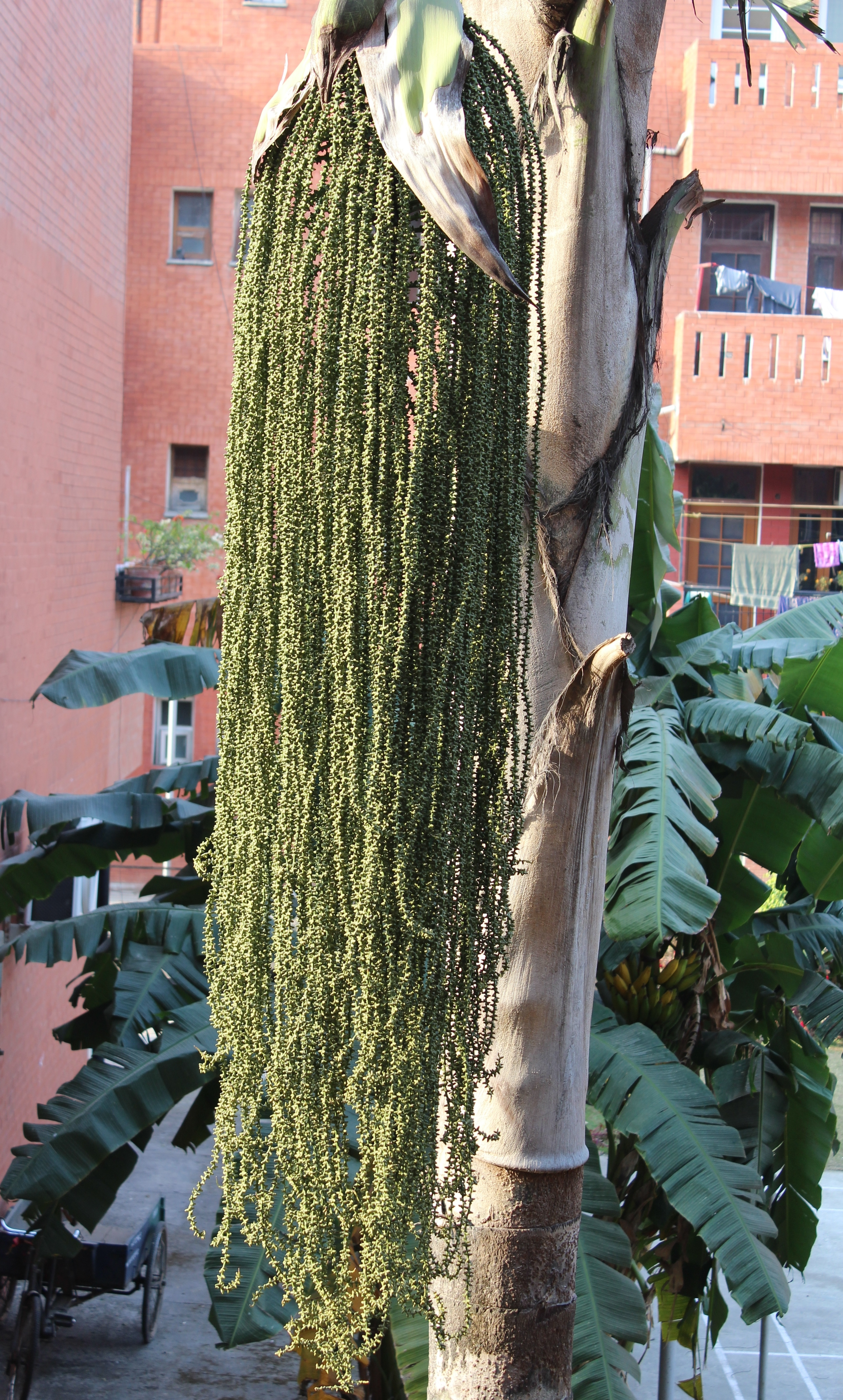
Fishtail palm at Chandigarh

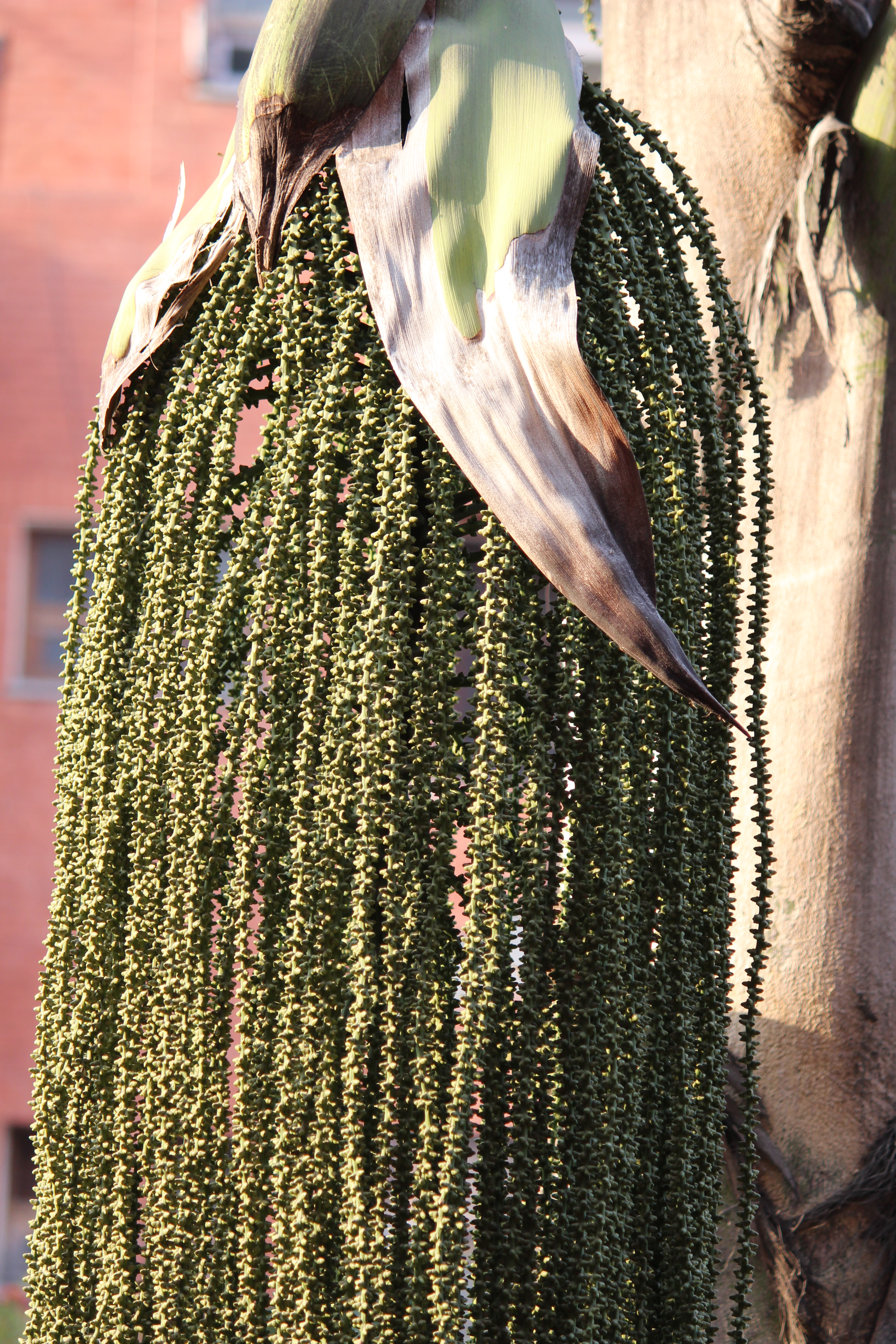
Fishtail palm - close up

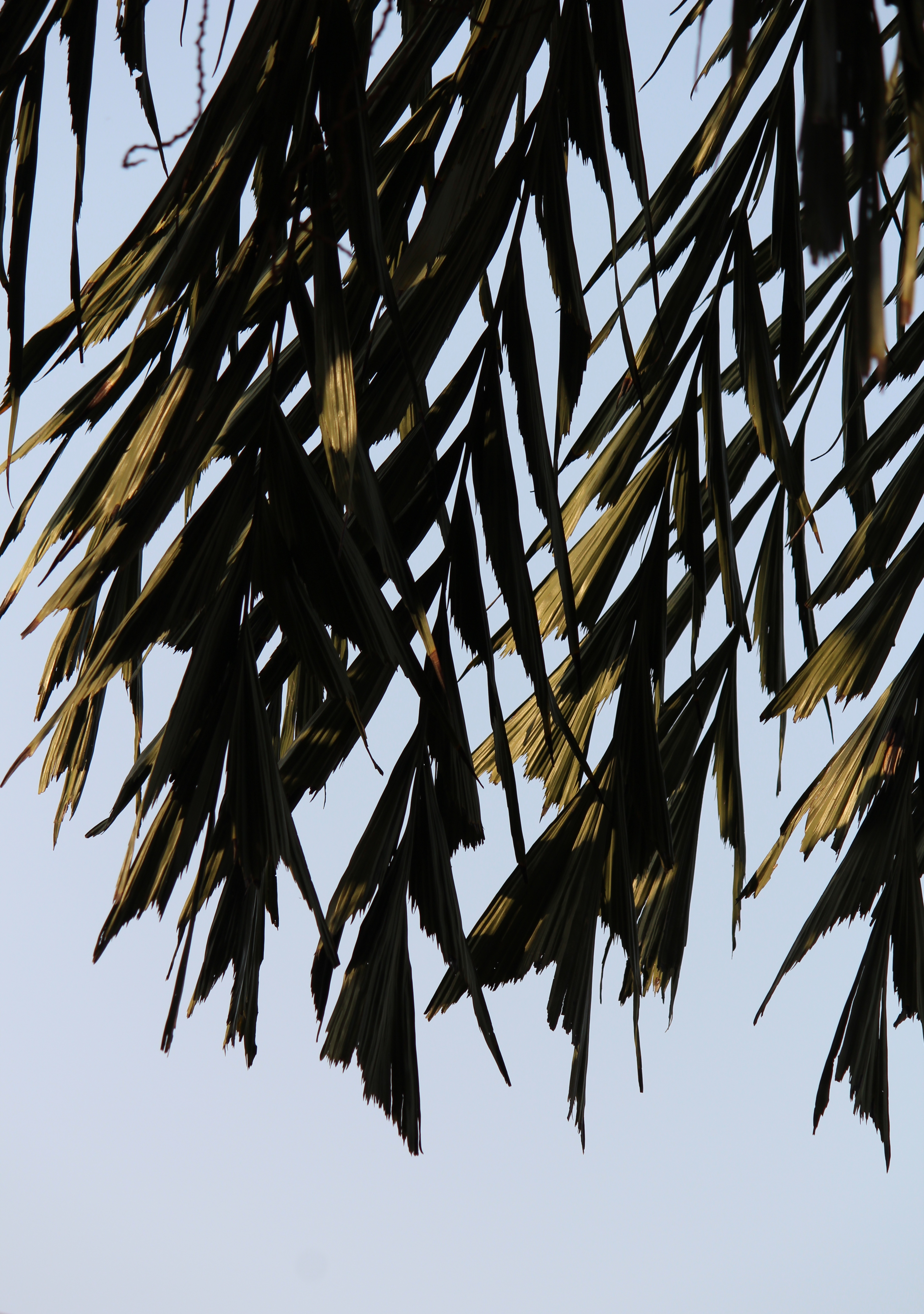
Leaves of fishtail palm tree

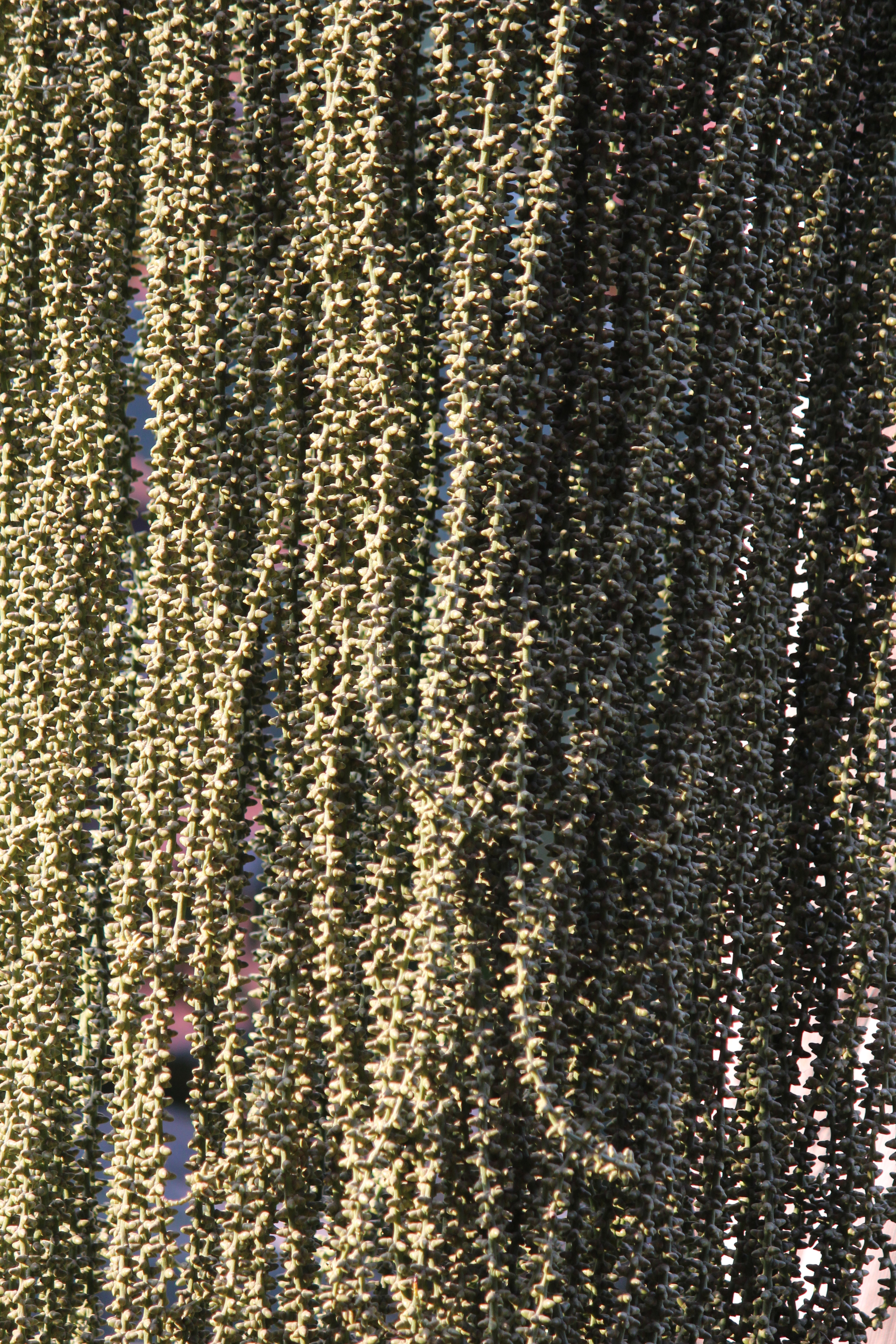
Fishtail palm - detail
