= Wallichia triandra =

Conservation status
- Least Concern (IUCN 2.3)

Scientific classification
- Kingdom: Plantae
- Clade: Tracheophytes
- Clade: Angiosperms
- Clade: Monocots
- Clade: Commelinids
- Order: Arecales
- Family: Arecaceae
- Genus: Wallichia
- Species: W. triandra

Binomial name
- Wallichia triandra (Joseph) S.K. Basu

Synonyms
- Asraoa triandra J.Joseph

Species of palm

Wallichia triandra is a species of flowering plant in the family Arecaceae that is native to South Tibet in China and also to the neighboring Arunachal Pradesh region of India.

== Description ==
The plant is 3 metres (9.8 ft) tall and 3–5 centimetres (1.2–2.0 in) wide while its rachis is 2 metres (6 ft 7 in) in length. Its rachillae are 20–30 centimetres (7.9–11.8 in) in length and the flowers are as big as 4 millimetres (0.16 in). Fruits are red and oblong.
