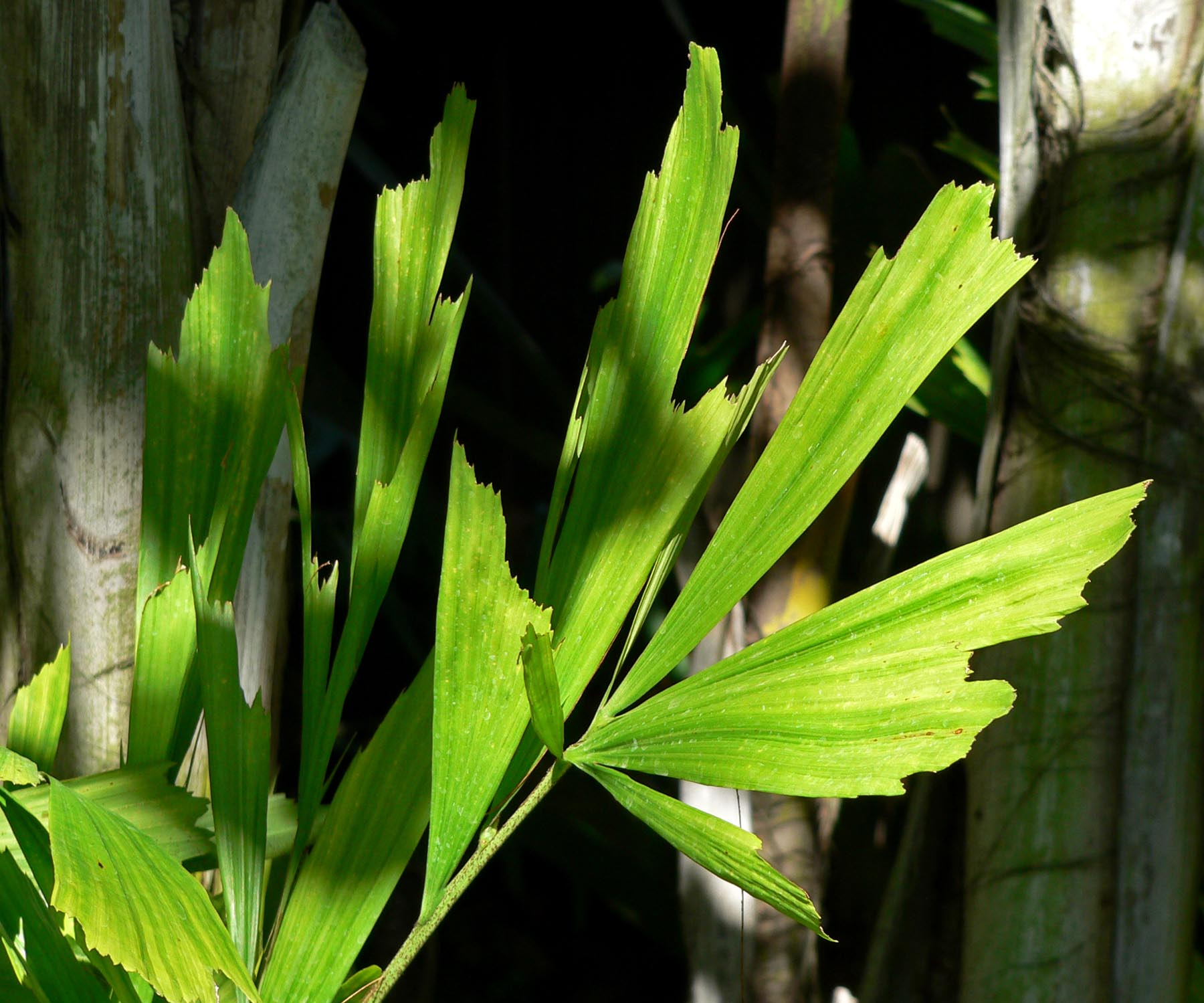

Conservation status
- Least Concern (IUCN 3.1)

Scientific classification
- Kingdom: Plantae
- Clade: Tracheophytes
- Clade: Angiosperms
- Clade: Monocots
- Clade: Commelinids
- Order: Arecales
- Family: Arecaceae
- Genus: Caryota
- Species: C. mitis

Binomial name
- Caryota mitis Lour.

Synonyms
- Caryota furfuracea Blume ex Mart.; C. griffithii Becc.; C. griffithii var. selebica Becc.; C. javanica Zipp. ex Miq.; C. nana Linden; C. propinqua Blume ex Mart.; C. sobolifera Wall. ex Mart.; C. sobolifera Wall.; C. speciosa Linden; Drymophloeus zippellii Hassk.; Thuessinkia speciosa Korth.

= Caryota mitis =

Species of palm

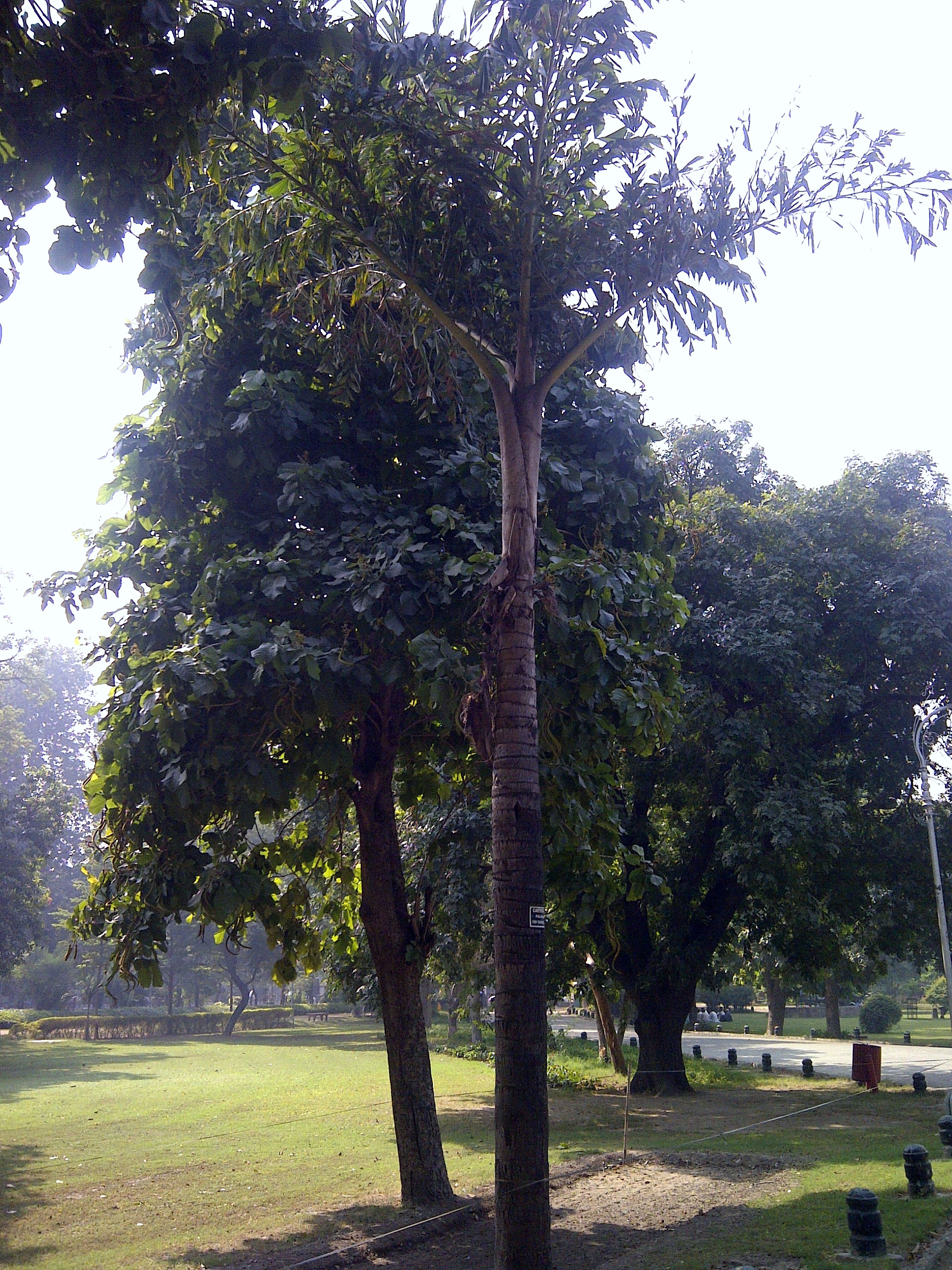
Caryota mitis in Bagh-e-Jinnah, Lahore

Caryota mitis, known as the clustering fishtail palm or fishtail palm, is a species of palm native to Tropical Asia from India to Java to southern China, now sparingly naturalized in southern Florida and in parts of Africa and Latin America. The species was originally described from Vietnam in 1790. In Florida, it grows in hummocks and in disturbed wooded areas.

== Botany ==
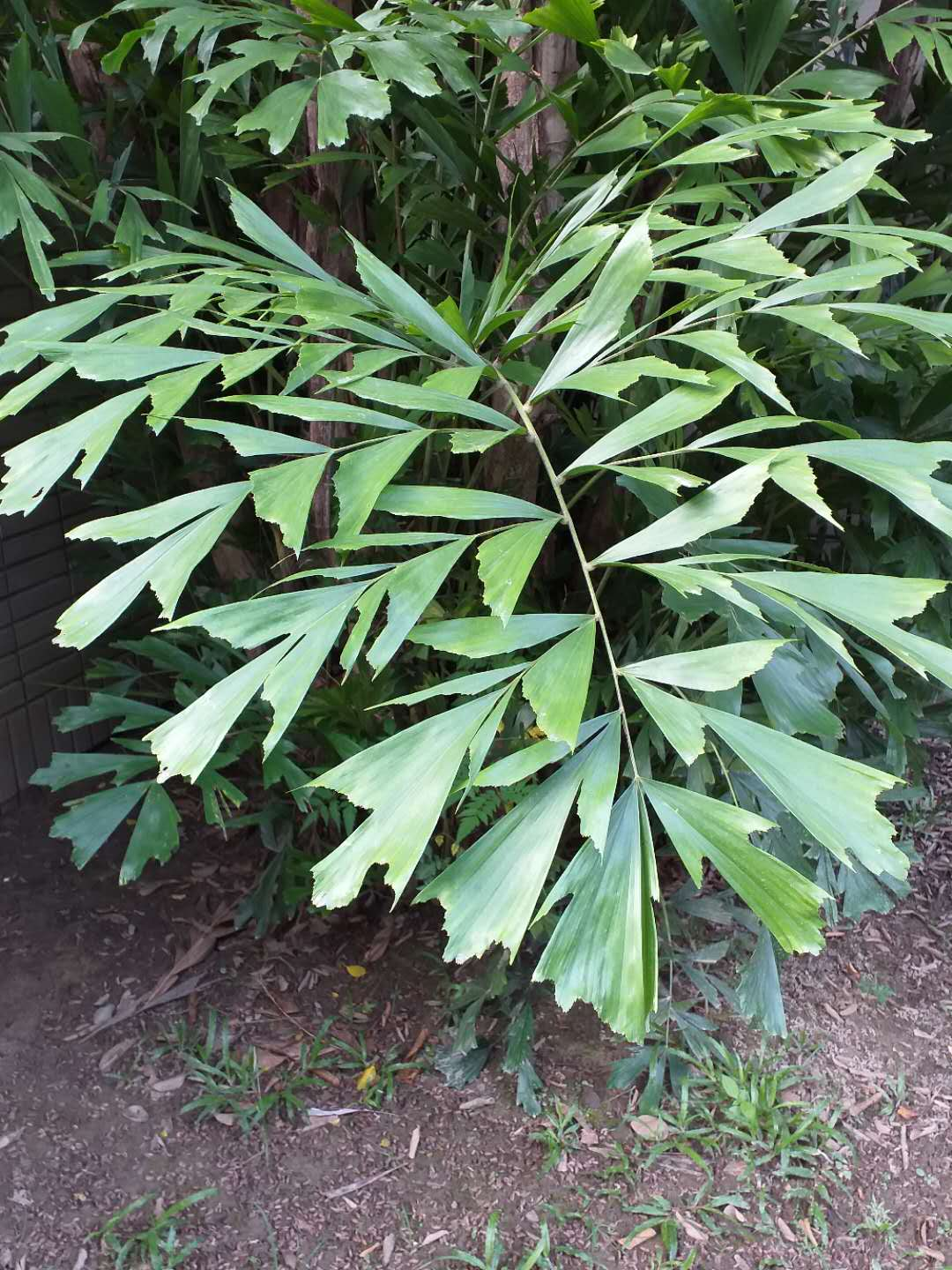
Leaf of a fishtail palm.

Caryota mitis has clustered stems up to 10 m (33 feet) tall and 15 cm (6 inches) in diameter. Leaves can be up to 3 m (10 feet) long. Each leaf is made of many pairs of leaflets shaped like tail fins that give this palm its name.

Flowers are purple and grow on hanging spikes. Its fruits turn dark purple or red when they are ripe, they are harmful to humans. The tree slowly deteriorates not long after it bears fruit.

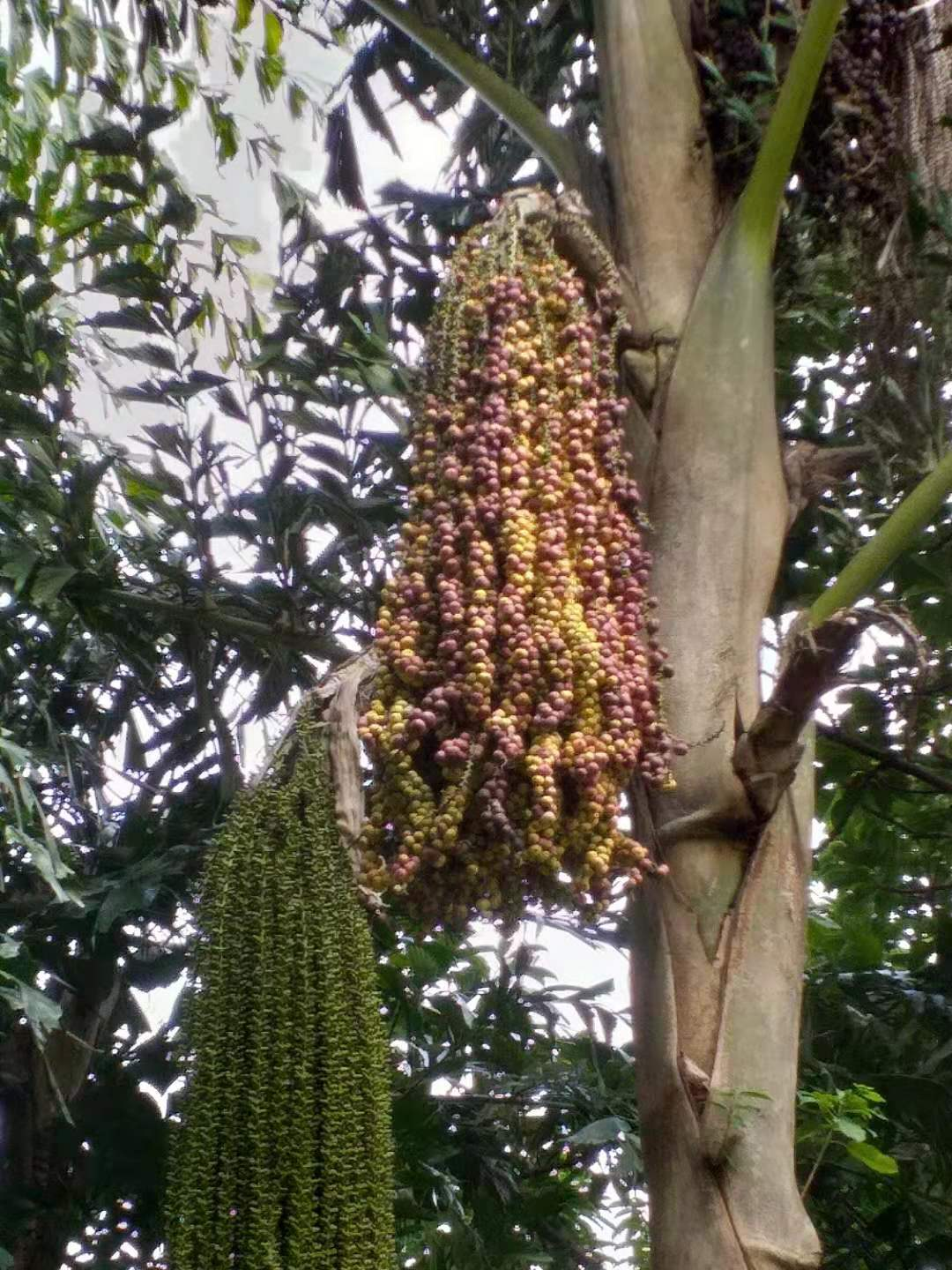
Fishtail fruits

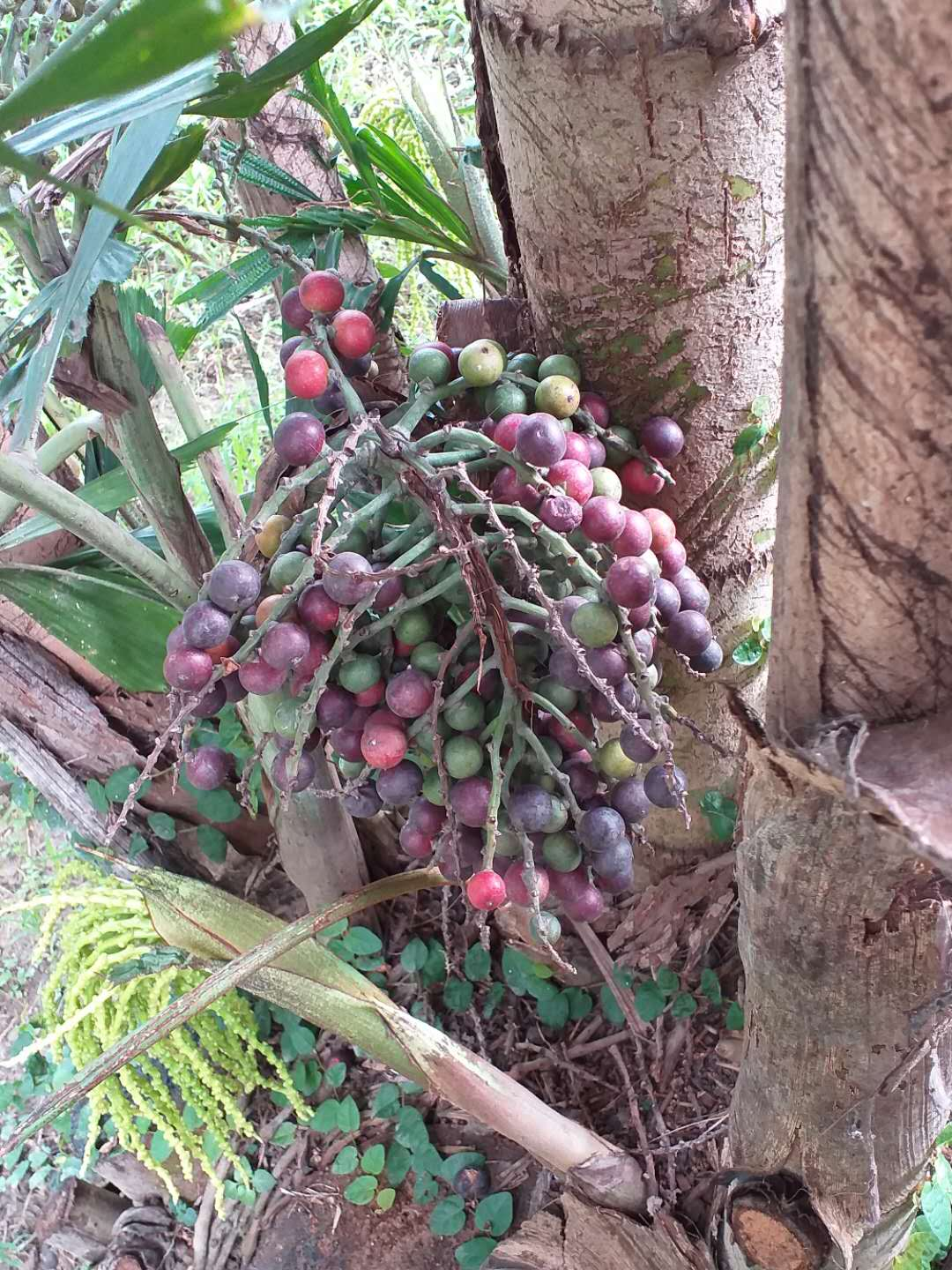
Fishtail palm fruits

== Uses ==
Cultivated mainly as an ornament plant in Cambodia, where it is named tunsaé töch, traditional healers burn the heaps of felted hairs from the leaves' axils to treat ill limbs of patients.

Its trunk pith can be extracted to make a kind of flour that has similar properties like sago.

== Toxicity ==
The fruit of C. mitis is saturated with raphides, sharp, needle-shaped crystals of calcium oxalate. The raphides are strong irritants that cause damage and later itching upon contact with skin, and if ingested, the mouth. This is a result of the physical structure of the raphides, and not any chemical reaction.

== Gallery ==
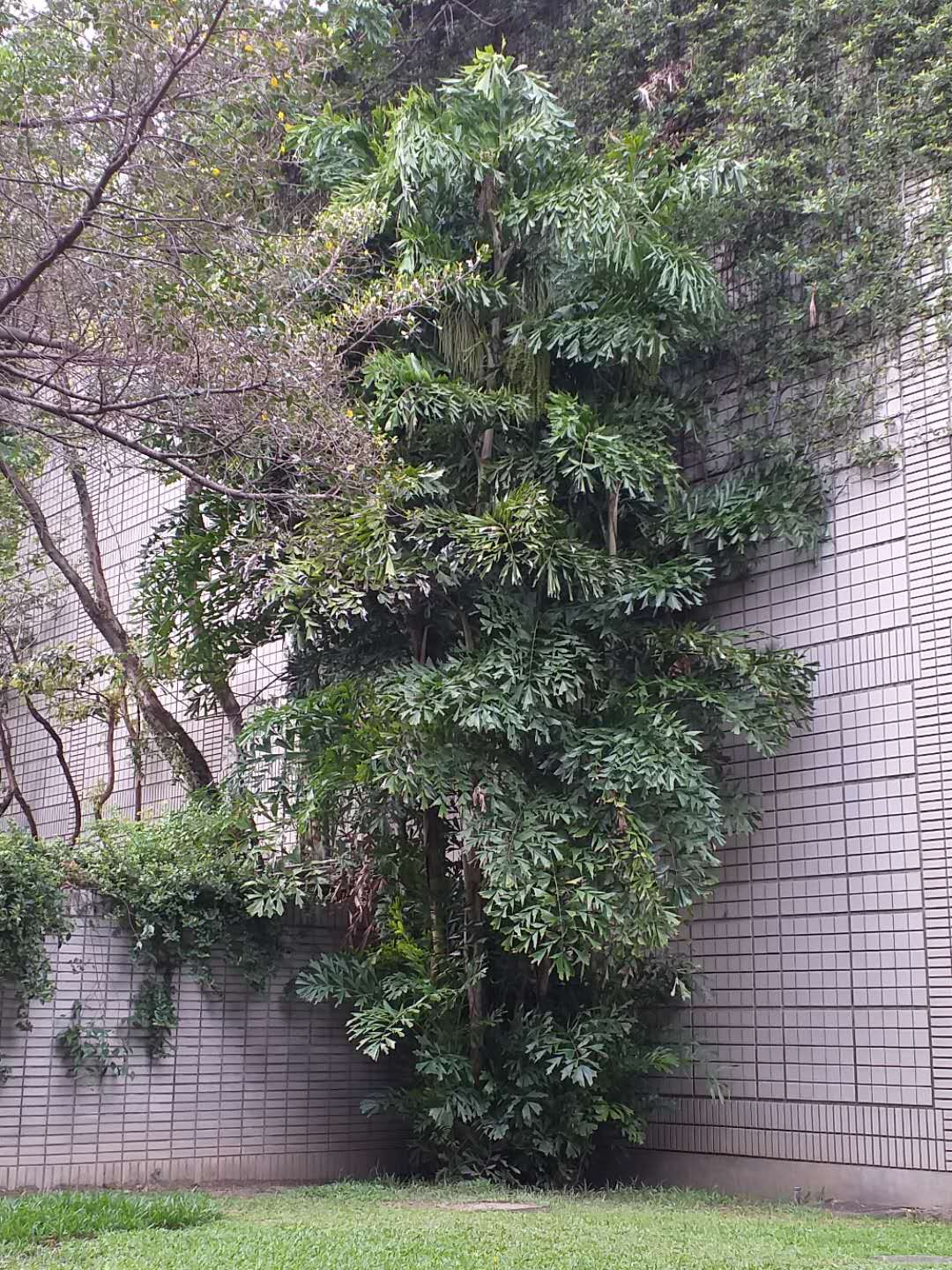
Plant

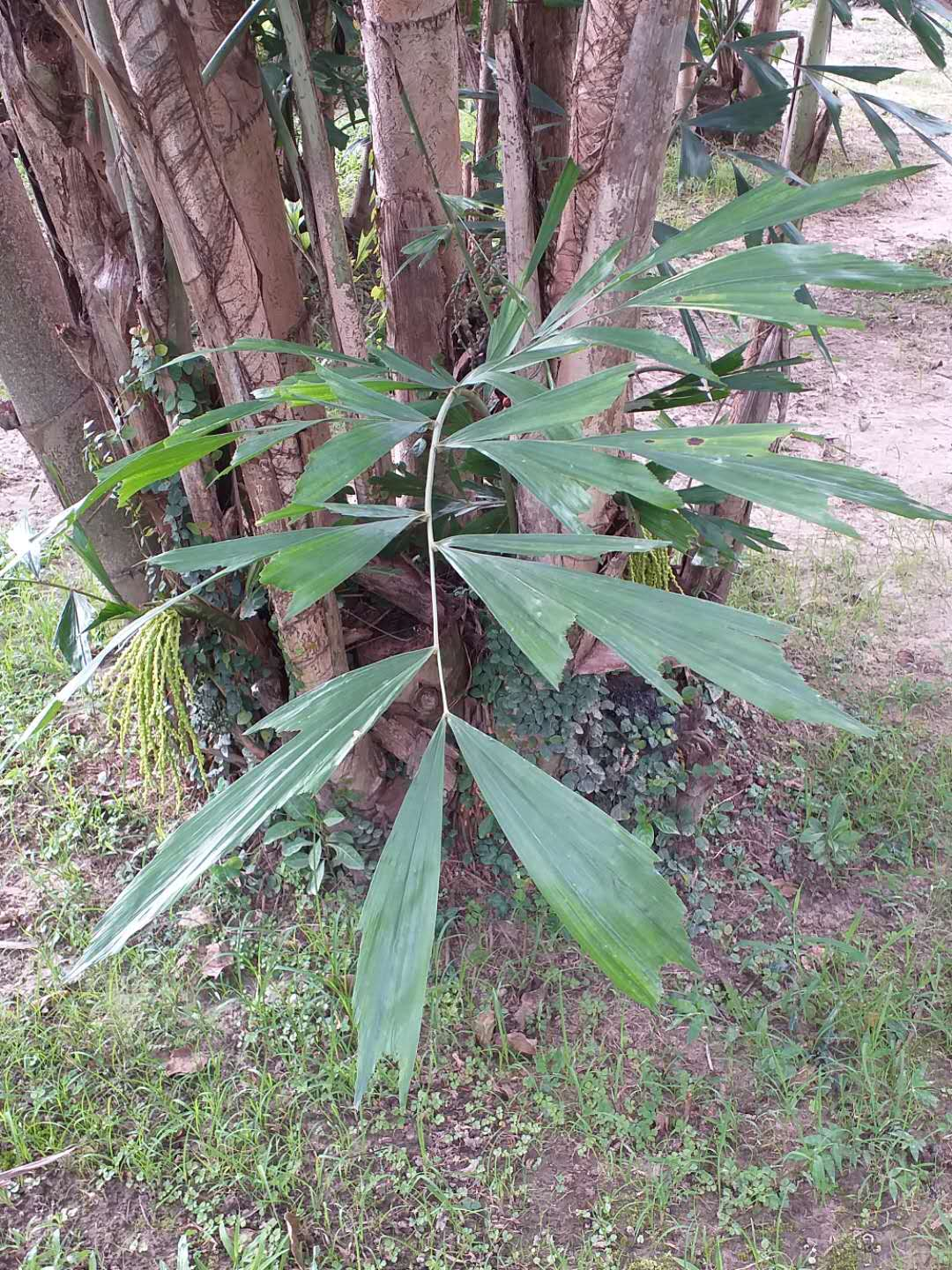
Characteristic of the grouping of trunks

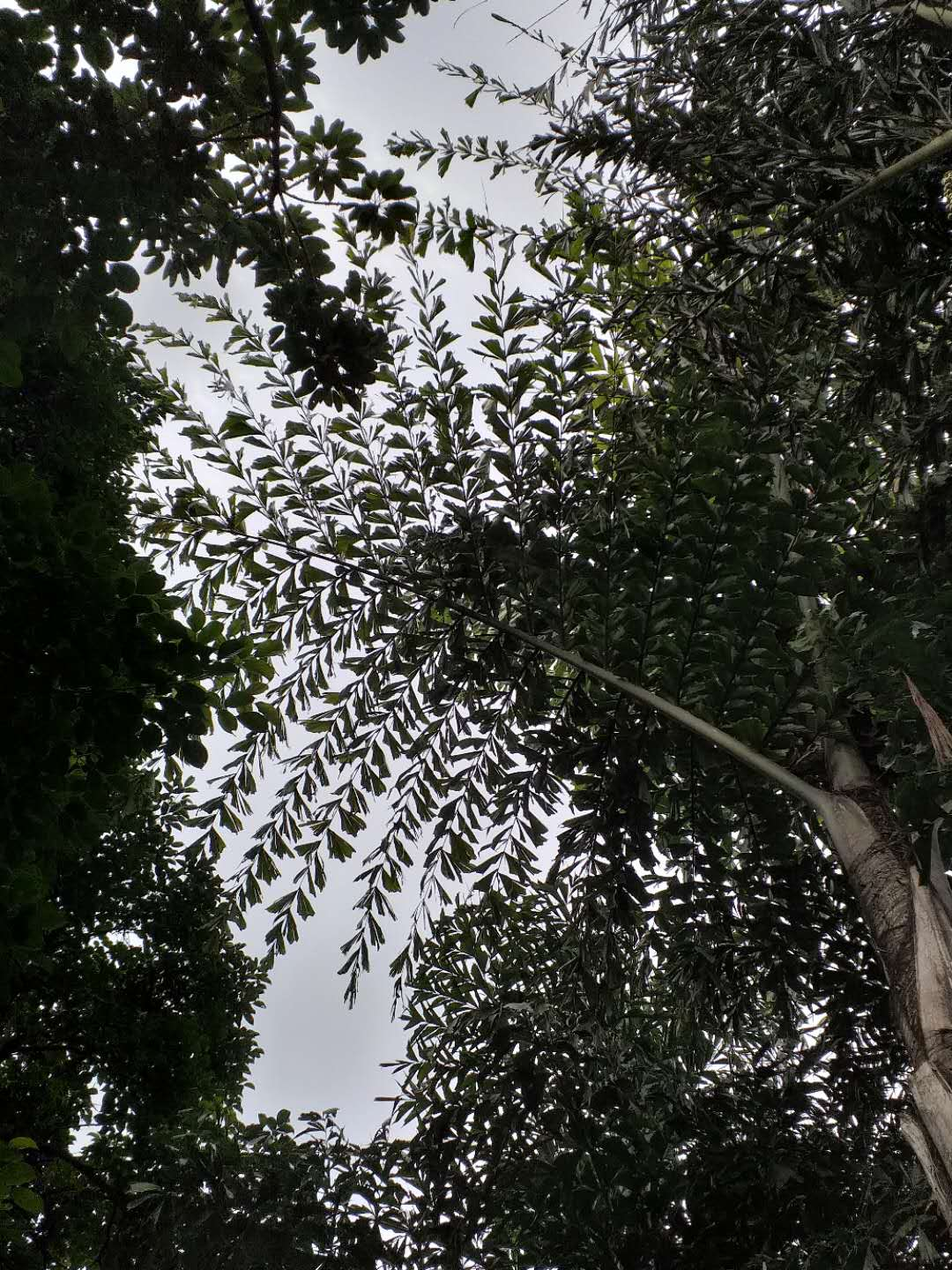
Phyllotaxis

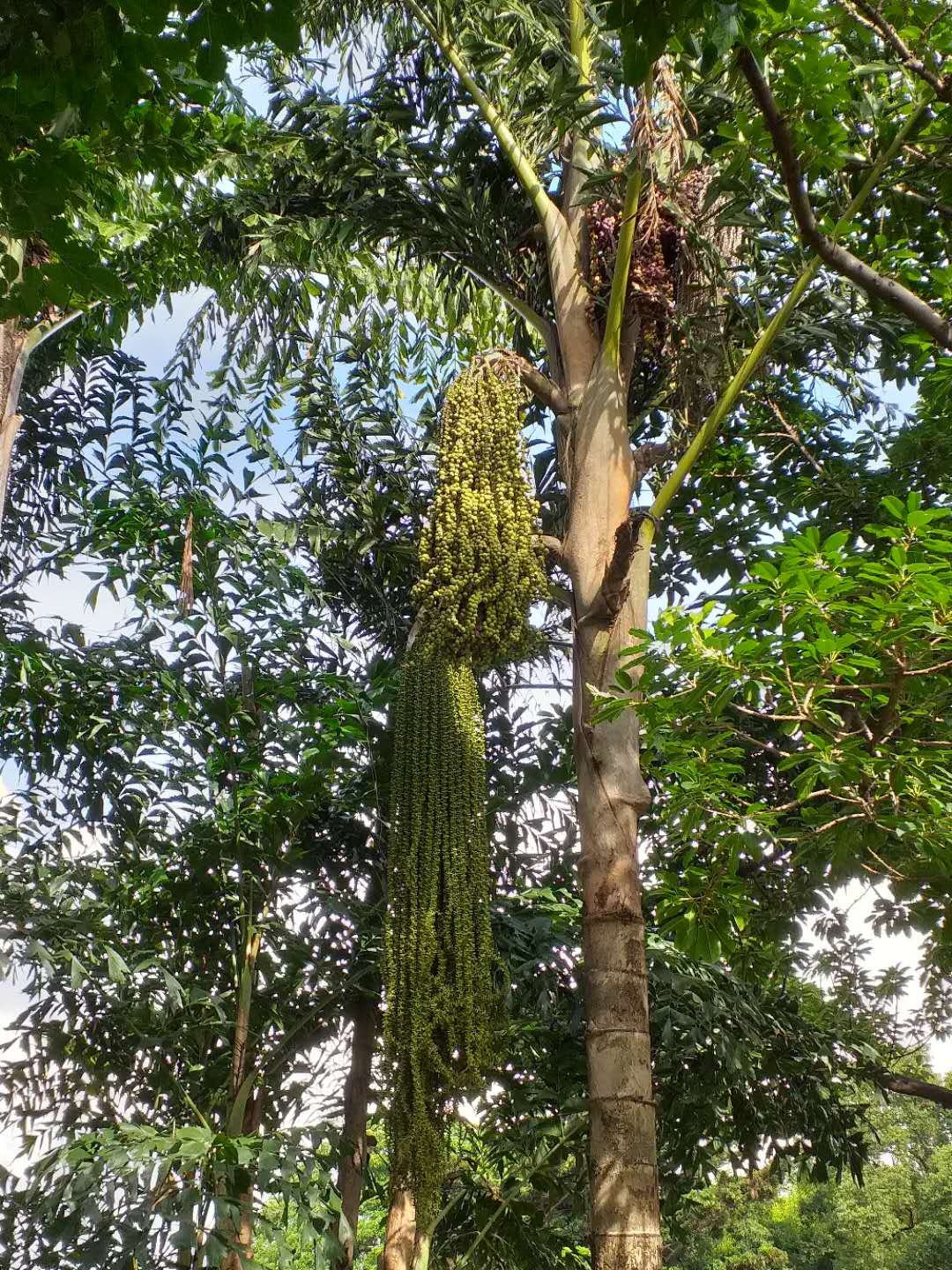
Fruits
