= Caryota kiriwongensis =

Conservation status
- Critically Endangered (IUCN 3.1)

Scientific classification
- Kingdom: Plantae
- Clade: Embryophytes
- Clade: Tracheophytes
- Clade: Spermatophytes
- Clade: Angiosperms
- Clade: Monocots
- Clade: Commelinids
- Order: Arecales
- Family: Arecaceae
- Genus: Caryota
- Species: C. kiriwongensis

Binomial name
- Caryota kiriwongensis Hodel

Species of plant

Caryota kiriwongensis, also known as the giant caryota, is a palm of peninsular Thailand. It belongs to the palm family Palmae or Arecaceae.

== Description ==
It is a recent discovery, first seen in 1992 by palmophile Aow Panya and described in 1998 by Dr. Donald Hodel. It is a very large palm; up to 36 metres (118 ft) height and 0.9 m (2 ft 11 in) DBH (diameter at breast height). It is perhaps most notable for its very large, bipinnate fronds, up to 11 m (36 ft) total length, of which 8 m (26 ft) is the blade or lamina, 50 cm (20 in) the petiole, and 2.5 m (8 ft 2 in) the crownshaft sheath. There are 2,500 fan-shaped or wedge-shaped leaflets.
