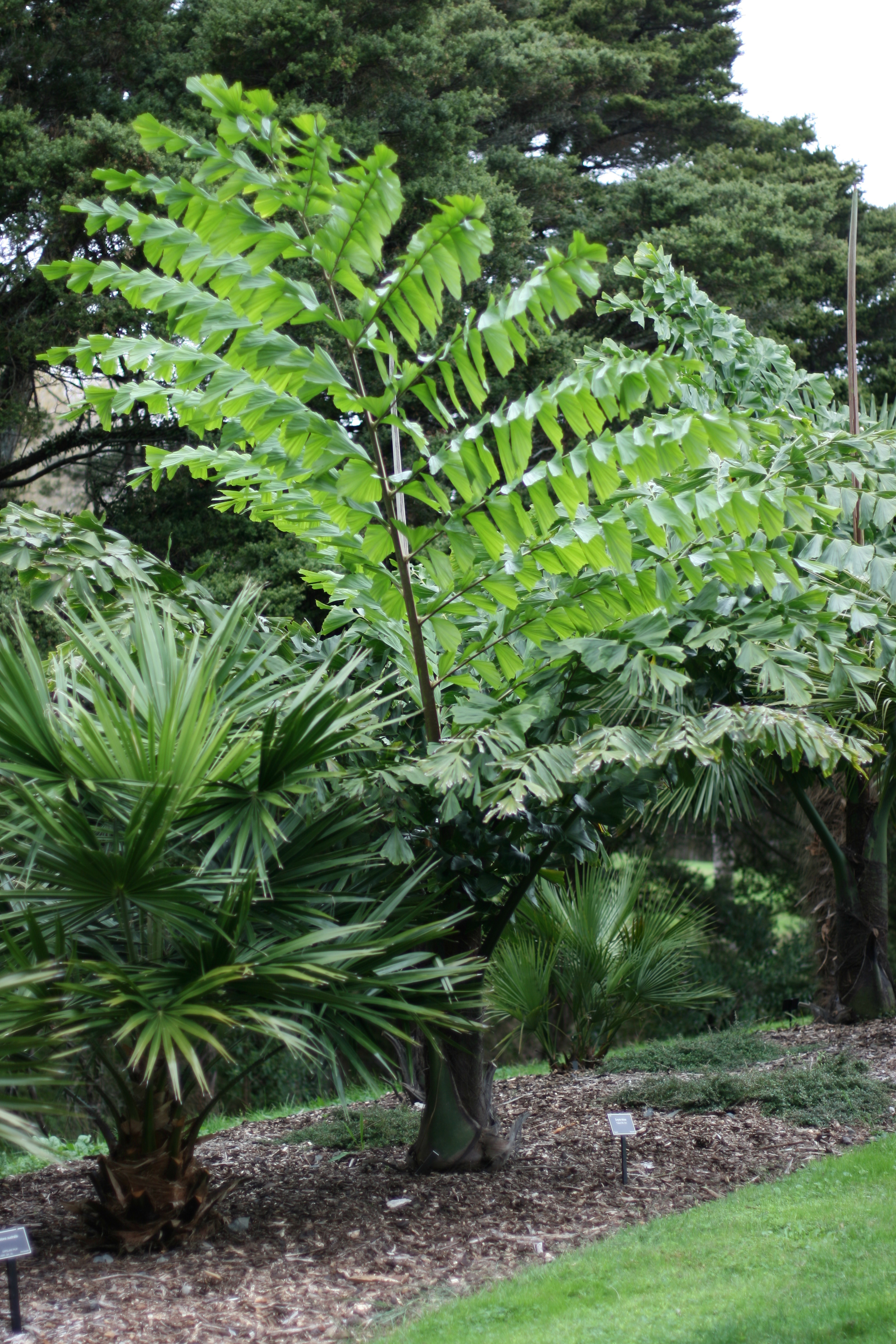
- Caryota obtusa with Livistona australis

Scientific classification
- Kingdom: Plantae
- Clade: Tracheophytes
- Clade: Angiosperms
- Clade: Monocots
- Clade: Commelinids
- Order: Arecales
- Family: Arecaceae
- Genus: Caryota
- Species: C. obtusa

Binomial name
- Caryota obtusa Griff.

Synonyms
- Caryota rumphiana var. indica Becc.; Caryota gigas Hahn ex Hodel; Caryota obtusidentata Griff.

= Caryota obtusa =

Species of palm

Caryota obtusa is a species of flowering plant in the palm family Arecaceae. It is native to India, Laos and Thailand. The palm is commonly called giant fishtail palm or Thai giant caryota. It can reach 20 meters or more in height and is thus considered a tree. It is monocarpic meaning it flowers once, then dies. Its inflorescence can reach 6 meters or more in length.

== Description ==
This palm usually produces a single stem with several leaves on its crown, and their stems are extremely hard, with even power tools such as chainsaws struggling to cut through their tough wood. Its leaves are bipinnate and often reach lengths of 20-25 feet in length, and produce fishtail shaped leaflets. Their peduncles are often wide and are a vivid green in color, and their flowers are often a creamy white. Their fruits are highly toxic due to their irritating oxalates, and when their fruits are ripe, they often turn reddish.
