= Singhi =

Town in Sarawak, Malaysia

Coordinates: 1°30′0″N 110°10′0″E

Singai is a town located in Sarawak, Malaysia. It is located several kilometers southwest of Kuching.

== Coordinates ==
- Latitude = 1.5
- Longitude = 110.1667
- Latitude (DMS) = 1° 30' 0 N
- Longitude (DMS) = 110° 10' 0 E
