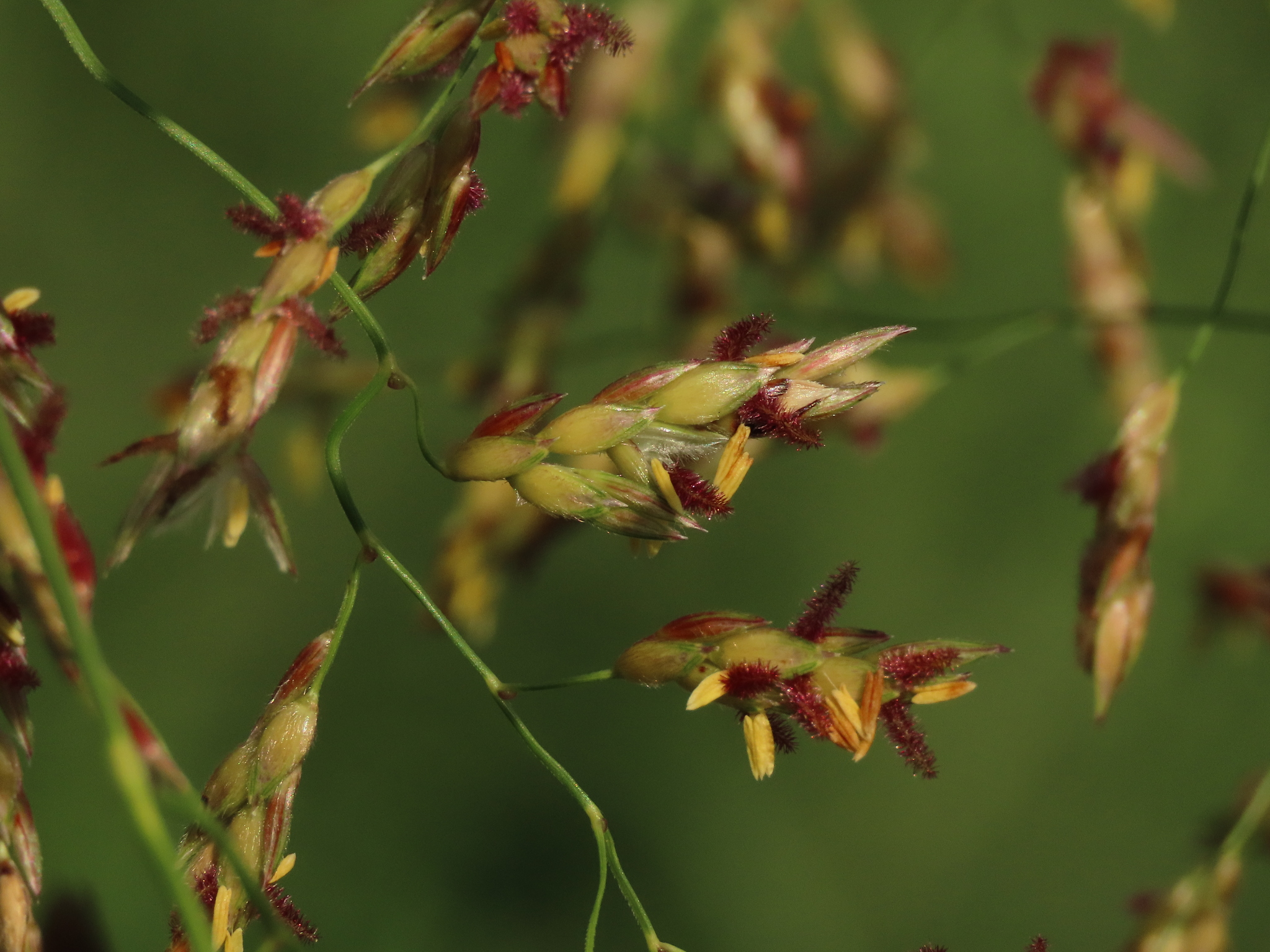
- Seed heads

Scientific classification
- Kingdom: Plantae
- Clade: Tracheophytes
- Clade: Angiosperms
- Clade: Monocots
- Clade: Commelinids
- Order: Poales
- Family: Poaceae
- Subfamily: Panicoideae
- Genus: Sorghum
- Species: S. propinquum

Binomial name
- Sorghum propinquum (Kunth) Hitchc.

Synonyms
- List: Andropogon affinis J.Presl; Andropogon halepensis var. propinquus (Kunth) Hack.; Andropogon halepensis subsp. siamensis Piper; Andropogon propinquus Kunth; Andropogon sorghum var. propinquus (Kunth) Hack.

= Sorghum propinquum =

Species of plant

Sorghum propinquum is a species of wild Sorghum native to most of tropical Asia, from India to Southeast Asia, southern China, Malesia and Papuasia. A perennial, rhizomatous diploid with the same number of chromosomes (2n=20) as the annual, non-rhizomatous diploid Sorghum bicolor, it is being studied for its potential for sorghum crop improvement. In an ancient hybridization event with S. bicolor, it gave rise to Johnson grass (S. halepense), one of the planet's worst weeds.
