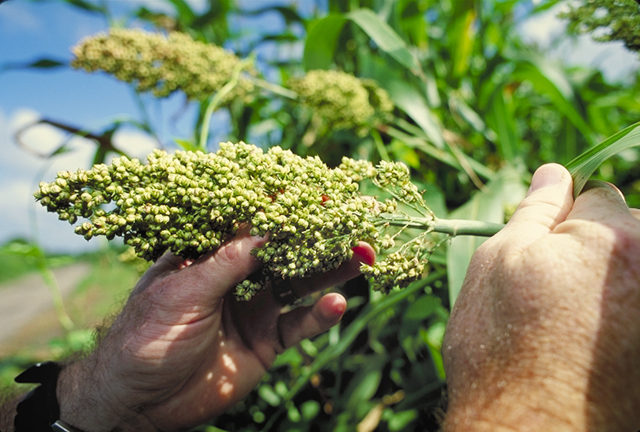
- S. bicolor

Scientific classification
- Kingdom: Plantae
- Clade: Embryophytes
- Clade: Tracheophytes
- Clade: Spermatophytes
- Clade: Angiosperms
- Clade: Monocots
- Clade: Commelinids
- Order: Poales
- Family: Poaceae
- Subfamily: Panicoideae
- Tribe: Andropogoneae
- Subtribe: Saccharinae
- Genus: Sorghum; Moench 1794, conserved name not Sorgum Adanson 1763

Type species
- S. bicolor (L.) Moench

Synonyms
- Blumenbachia Koeler 1802, rejected name not Schrad. 1825 (Loasaceae); Sarga Ewart; Vacoparis Spangler; Andropogon Hackel.

= Sorghum (genus) =

Genus of flowering plants

Sorghum (/ˈsɔːrɡəm/) or broomcorn is a genus of about 28 species of flowering plants in the grass family (Poaceae). Sorghum bicolor is grown as a cereal for human consumption and as animal fodder.

== Taxonomy ==
The Sorghum genus is in the grass family, Poaceae, in the subfamily Panicoideae, in the tribe Andropogoneae – the same as maize (Zea mays), big bluestem (Andropogon gerardi), and sugarcane (Saccharum spp.). Accepted species recorded include:

- Sorghum amplum – northwestern Australia
- Sorghum angustum – Queensland
- Sorghum arundinaceum – Africa, Indian Subcontinent, Madagascar, islands of the western Indian Ocean
- Sorghum bicolor – cultivated sorghum, also known as durra, jowari, or milo. Native to Sahel region of Africa; naturalized in many places
- Sorghum brachypodum – Northern Territory of Australia
- Sorghum bulbosum – Northern Territory, Western Australia
- Sorghum burmahicum – Thailand, Myanmar
- Sorghum controversum – India
- Sorghum × drummondii – Sahel and West Africa
- Sorghum ecarinatum – Northern Territory, Western Australia
- Sorghum exstans – Northern Territory of Australia
- Sorghum grande – Northern Territory, Queensland
- Sorghum halepense – Johnson grass – North Africa, islands of eastern Atlantic, southern Asia from Lebanon to Vietnam; naturalized in East Asia, Australia, the Americas
- Sorghum interjectum – Northern Territory, Western Australia
- Sorghum intrans – Northern Territory, Western Australia
- Sorghum laxiflorum – Philippines, Lesser Sunda Islands, Sulawesi, New Guinea, northern Australia
- Sorghum leiocladum – Queensland, New South Wales, Victoria
- Sorghum macrospermum – Northern Territory of Australia
- Sorghum matarankense – Northern Territory, Western Australia
- Sorghum nitidum – East Asia, Indian Subcontinent, Southeast Asia, New Guinea, Micronesia
- Sorghum plumosum – Australia, New Guinea, Indonesia
- Sorghum propinquum – China, Indian Subcontinent, Southeast Asia, New Guinea, Christmas Island, Micronesia, Cook Islands
- Sorghum purpureosericeum – Sahel from Mali to Tanzania; Yemen, Oman, India
- Sorghum stipoideum – Northern Territory, Western Australia
- Sorghum timorense – Lesser Sunda Islands, Maluku, New Guinea, northern Australia
- Sorghum trichocladum – Mexico, Guatemala, Honduras
- Sorghum versicolor – eastern + southern Africa from Ethiopia to Namibia; Oman
- Sorghum virgatum – dry regions from Senegal to the Levant.

=== Phylogeny ===
The Sorghum genus is closely related to maize within the PACMAD clade of grasses, and more distantly to the cereals of the BOP clade such as wheat and barley.

- (Part of Poaceae)
  - BOP clade
    - Bambusoideae (bamboos)
    - - Pooideae
        - other grasses
          (fescue, ryegrass)
        - Triticeae
          - Hordeum (barley)
          - - Triticum (wheat)
            - Secale (rye)
      - Oryza (rice)
  - PACMAD clade
    - Pennisetum (fountaingrasses, pearl millet)
    - - Sorghum (sorghum)
      - Zea (maize)

== Distribution ==
Seventeen of the 28 species are native to Australia, with the range of some extending to Africa, Asia, Mesoamerica, and certain islands in the Indian and Pacific Oceans.
