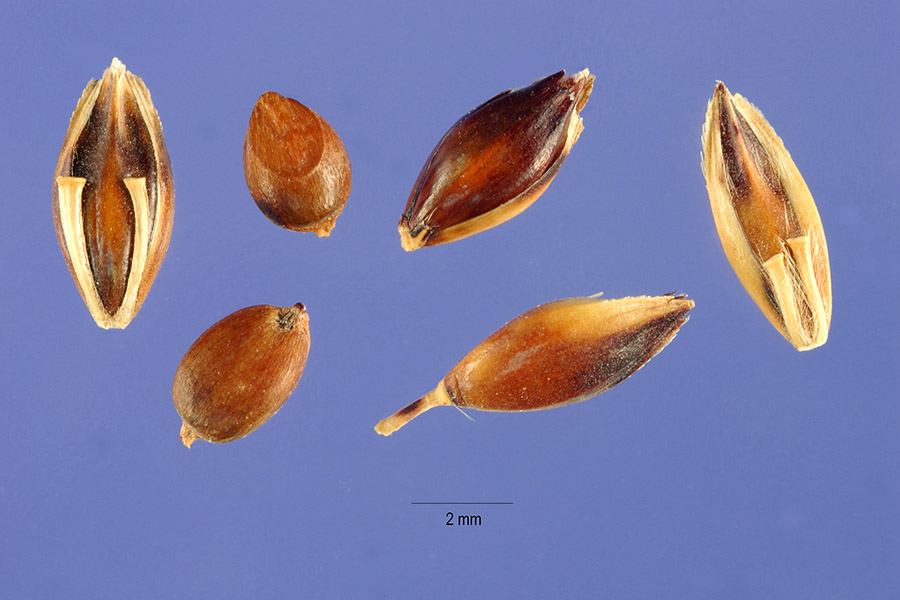
- Seeds

Scientific classification
- Kingdom: Plantae
- Clade: Embryophytes
- Clade: Tracheophytes
- Clade: Angiosperms
- Clade: Monocots
- Clade: Commelinids
- Order: Poales
- Family: Poaceae
- Subfamily: Panicoideae
- Genus: Sorghum
- Species: S. × almum

Binomial name
- Sorghum × almum Parodi

= Sorghum × almum =

Hybrid species of plant

Sorghum × almum, the Columbus grass, is a hybrid species of flowering plant in the family Poaceae. Its parents are Sorghum bicolor × S. halepense (Johnsongrass). Sorghum × almum is one of the most valuable livestock forage and fodder crops during summer in semi-arid and sub-humid areas worldwide. It is considered a noxious weed in several US and Australian states.
