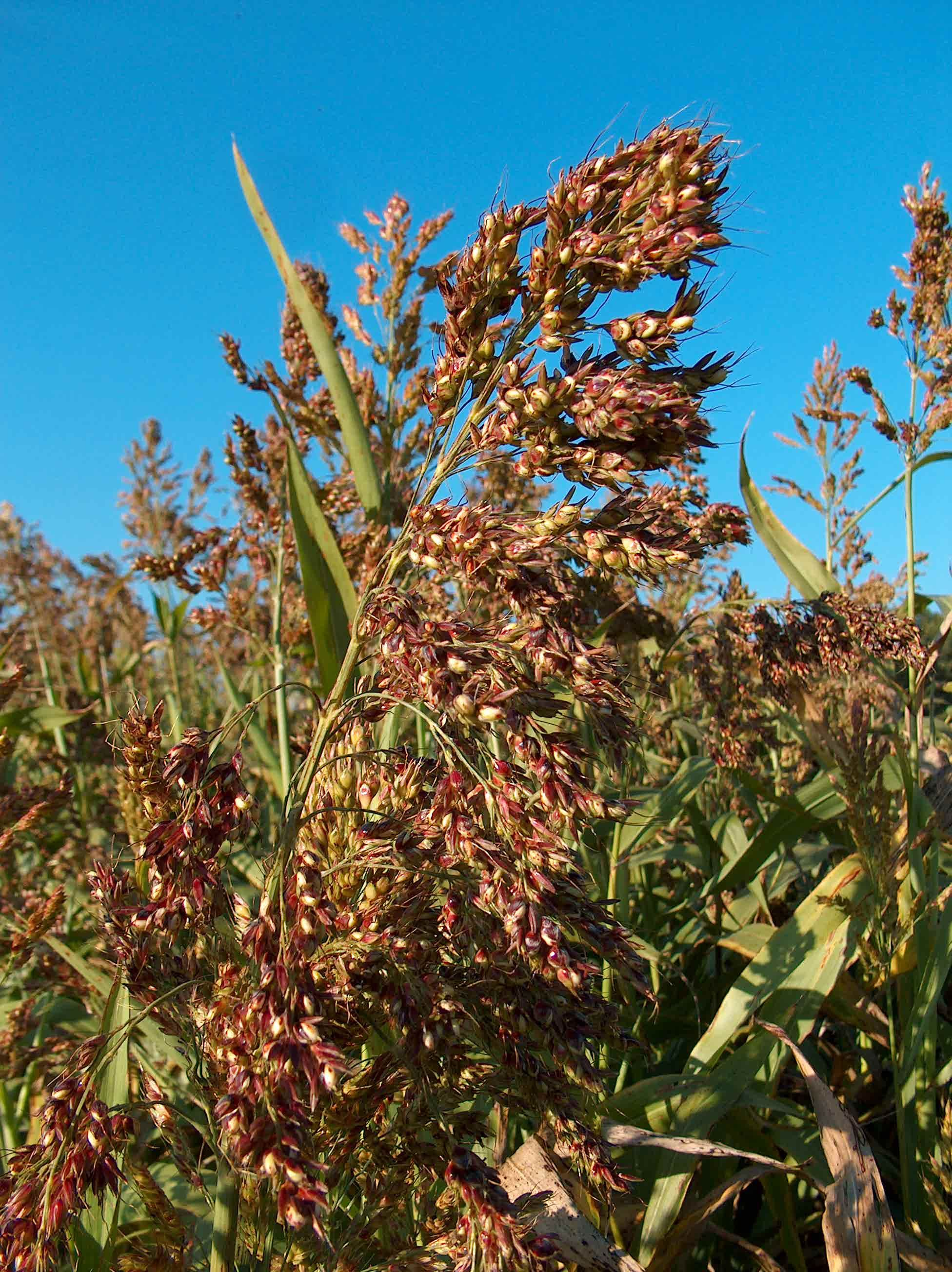

Scientific classification
- Kingdom: Plantae
- Clade: Tracheophytes
- Clade: Angiosperms
- Clade: Monocots
- Clade: Commelinids
- Order: Poales
- Family: Poaceae
- Subfamily: Panicoideae
- Genus: Sorghum
- Species: S. × drummondii

Binomial name
- Sorghum × drummondii (Nees ex. Steud.) Millsp. & Chase

Synonyms
- Andropogon × drummondii Nees ex Steud.; Andropogon × sudanensis (Piper) Leppan & Bosman; Holcus × sudanensis (Piper) L.H.Bailey; Sorghum × sudanense (Piper) Stapf; Sorghum bicolor subsp. drummondii (Steud.) de Wet ex Davidse, 1993; Sorghum bicolor × Sorghum arundinaceum

= Sorghum × drummondii =

Sudan grass

Hybrid species of grass

Sorghum × drummondii (Sudan grass), is a hybrid-derived species of grass raised for forage and grain, native to tropical and subtropical regions of Eastern Africa. It may also be known as Sorghum bicolor × Sorghum arundinaceum after its parents. Some authorities consider all three species to be subspecies under S. bicolor.

The plant is cultivated in Southern Europe, South America, Central America, North America and Southern Asia, for forage or as a cover crop. When treated as a weed, it is known as shattercane. It is distinguished from the grain sorghum (S. bicolor) by the grain (caryopsis) not being exposed at maturity.

Like sorghum, new plant growth, especially after a drought or frost, can be toxic to grazing animals.
