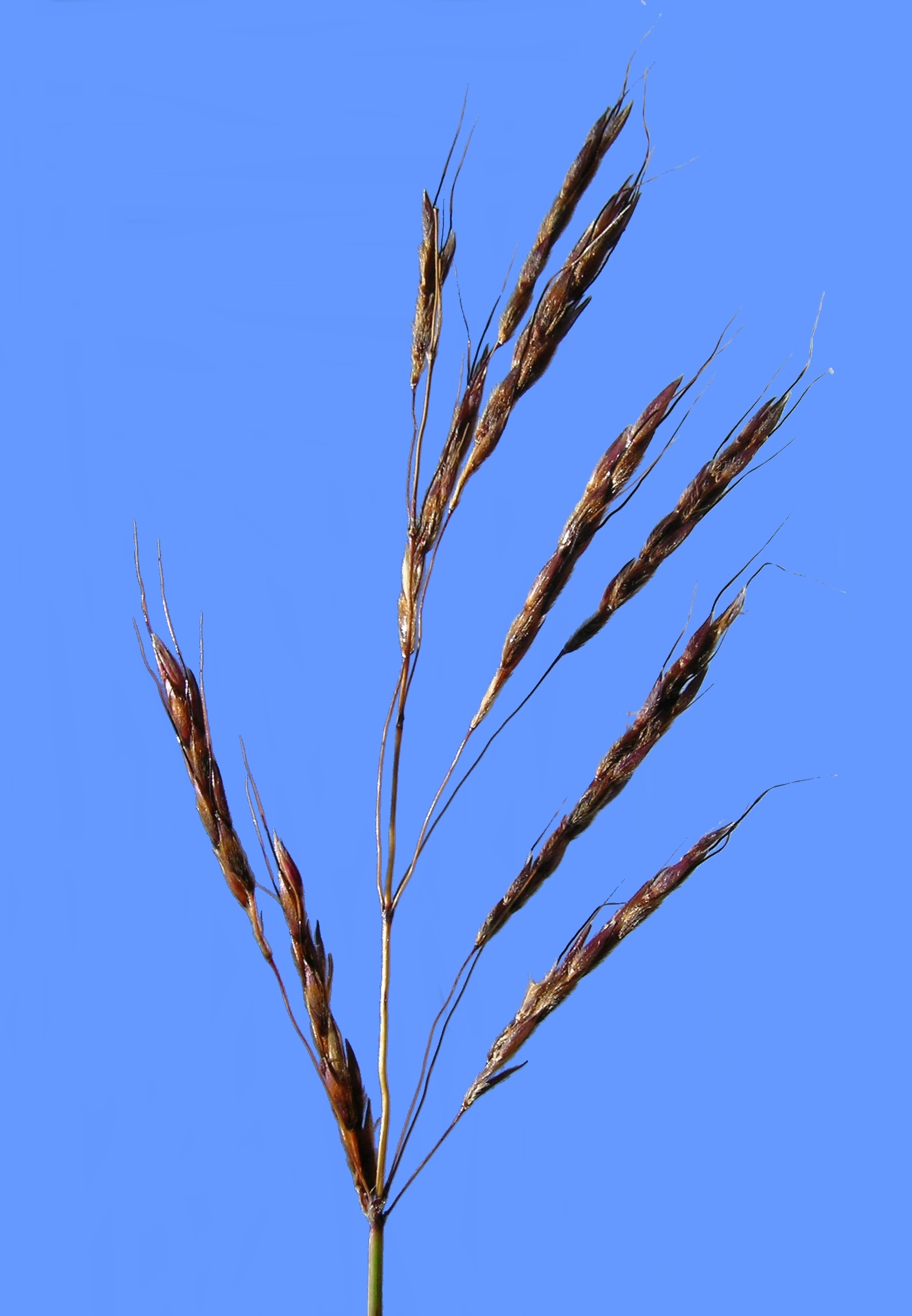
- Sarga leioclada

Scientific classification
- Kingdom: Plantae
- Clade: Tracheophytes
- Clade: Angiosperms
- Clade: Monocots
- Clade: Commelinids
- Order: Poales
- Family: Poaceae
- Subfamily: Panicoideae
- Supertribe: Andropogonodae
- Tribe: Andropogoneae
- Subtribe: Sorghinae
- Genus: Sarga; Ewart

Species
- See text

= Sarga =

Genus of Poaceae plants

Sarga is a genus of flowering plants in the grass family Poaceae, native to Mexico, Central America, Africa, the Arabian Peninsula, India, Indonesia, New Guinea, and Australia. It was resurrected from Sorghum in 2003.

== Species ==
The following species are accepted:

- Sarga angusta (S.T.Blake) Spangler
- Sarga intrans (F.Muell. ex Benth.) Spangler
- Sarga leioclada (Hack.) Spangler
- Sarga plumosa (R.Br.) Spangler
- Sarga purpureosericea (Hochst. ex A.Rich.) Spangler
- Sarga stipoidea Ewart & Jean White
- Sarga timorensis (Kunth) Spangler
- Sarga trichoclada (Rupr. ex Hack.) Spangler
- Sarga versicolor (Andersson) Spangler
