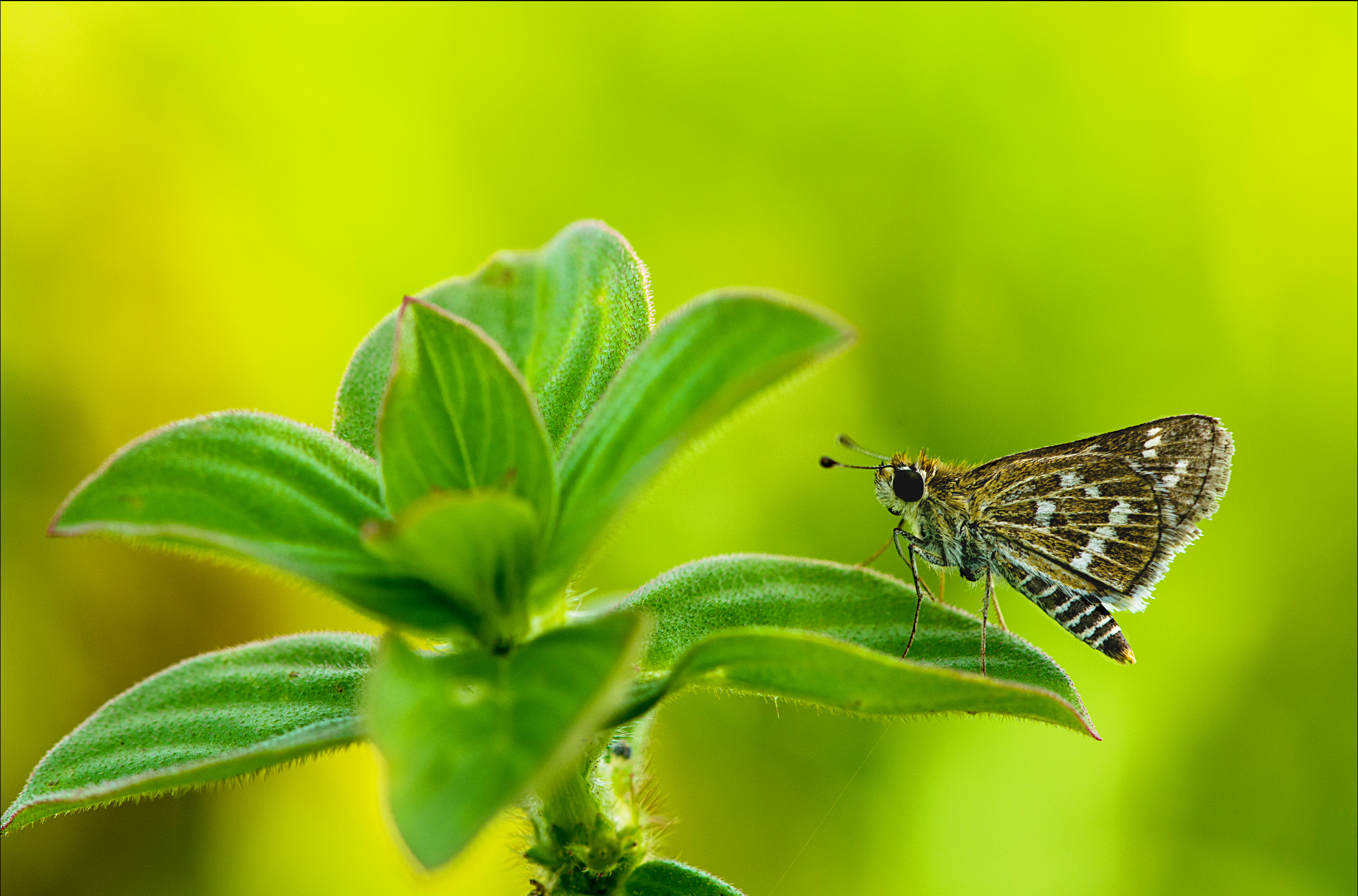

Scientific classification
- Kingdom: Animalia
- Phylum: Arthropoda
- Clade: Pancrustacea
- Class: Insecta
- Order: Lepidoptera
- Family: Hesperiidae
- Genus: Taractrocera
- Species: T. maevius

Binomial name
- Taractrocera maevius (Fabricius, 1793)

Synonyms
- Hesperia maevius Fabricius, 1793

= Taractrocera maevius =

Species of butterfly

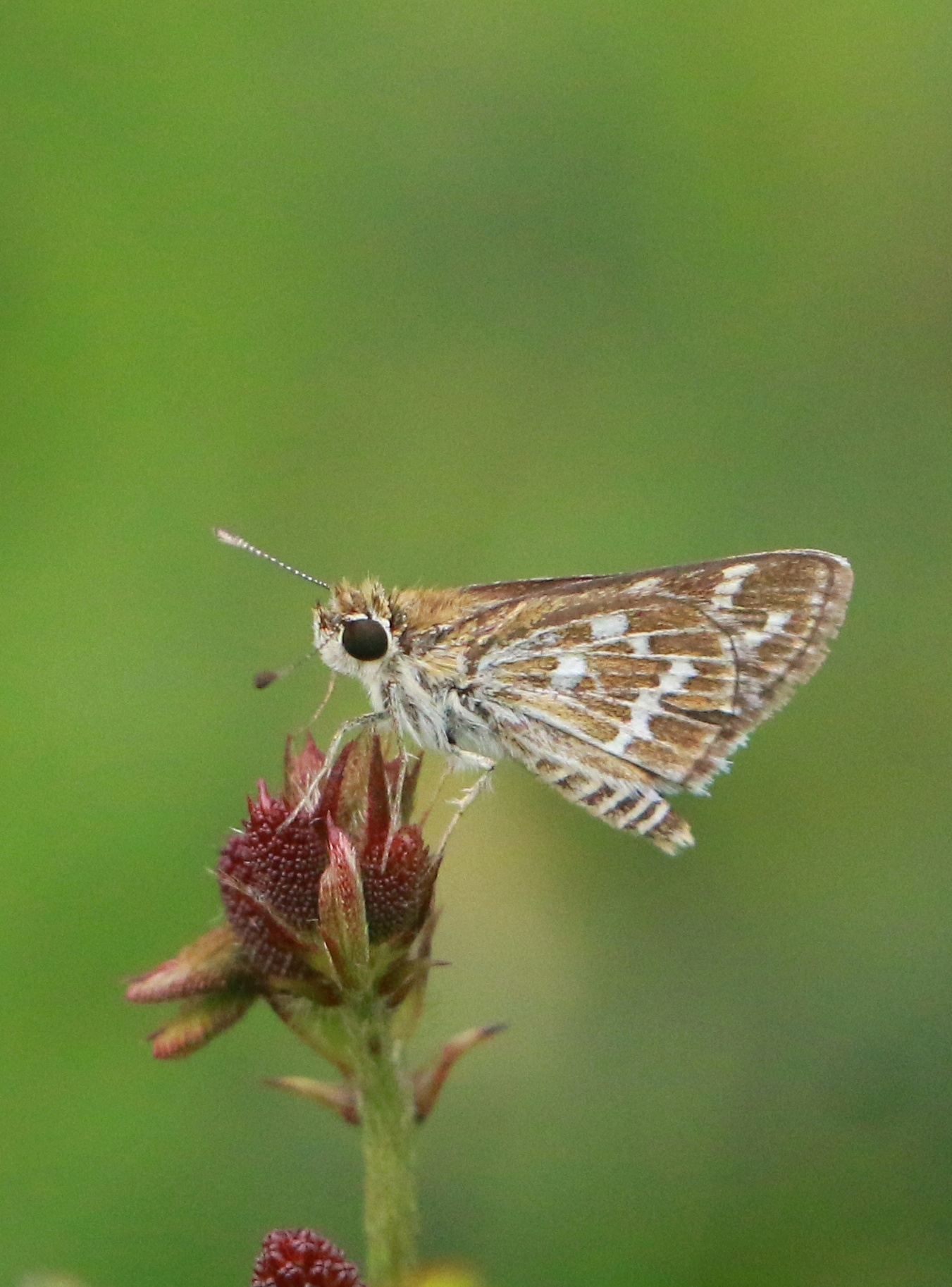
Common Grass Dart from koottanad Palakkad Kerala

Taractrocera maevius, the common grass dart, is a species of butterfly belonging to the family Hesperiidae. It is found in India, Sri Lanka and Myanmar.

== Description ==
Male. Upperside olive-brown, with yellowish-white markings. Forewing with a short streak on the median vein in the middle of the cell, another above it at the upper end, with two short small streaks between it and the costa, sometimes connected together; a series of spots in two parts across the disc, three conjoined from the costa near the apex, and four commencing at the base of the second median interspace, divided from each other by the veins, all the spots somewhat quadrate and excavated on their outward sides, two small quadrate spots nearer the margin in the fifth and sixth interspaces. Hindwing with a series of small spots in almost a straight line in the middle of the disc. Cilia of both wings grey with white tips. Underside with the colour similar, almost as dark as on the upperside, markings similar, but on the hindwing there is a bar across the end of the cell, and two small sub-apical spots outside it. Antennse black with white bands, the club with a white basal patch on the underside; palpi above grey with some white hairs, pure white on the underside; head and body concolorous with the wings, abdomen with white segmental bands. Female. Upperside like the male, but somewhat paler, the spots larger and more prominent. Underside with the markings as on the upperside. Forewing with the costal and apical portions whitish, the veins below the costa and at the apex white, a narrow, white outer marginal band and a black marginal line. Hindwing entirely suffused with white, all the veins pure white.

— Charles Swinhoe, Lepidoptera Indica. Vol. X

== Field characteristics ==
The common grass dart is similar in size and markings to the Tamil grass dart Taractrocera ceramas Hewitson, but the spots on the forewings is white. It shares its habits and habitat with the Tamil grass dart. However, it is also found away from the hills and is widespread in the plains of Indian peninsula. In flight, it can resemble the grass blues (Zizeeria spp.).

== Status, distribution and habitat ==
It is one of the most common of the skippers in the grasslands of the Western Ghats and occurs from low elevations up to montane grasslands. It is also found in grassy clearings in the forests and in rice fields. It occurs in the monsoon and immediate post-monsoon months when the vegetation is green, but occasional specimens may appear in other seasons as well.

The caterpillars feed on various species of grasses, including rice, Oryza sativa.
