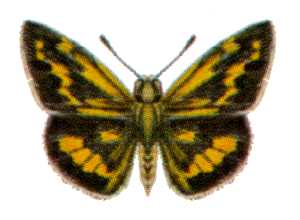

Scientific classification
- Kingdom: Animalia
- Phylum: Arthropoda
- Class: Insecta
- Order: Lepidoptera
- Family: Hesperiidae
- Genus: Taractrocera
- Species: T. ina

Binomial name
- Taractrocera ina Waterhouse, 1932

Synonyms
- Taractrocera ina iola Waterhouse, 1933

= Taractrocera ina =

Species of butterfly

Taractrocera ina, the ina grassdart or no-brand grass-dart, is a butterfly of the family Hesperiidae. It is found in northern, central and eastern Australia in scattered localities, south to western New South Wales and Papua New Guinea.

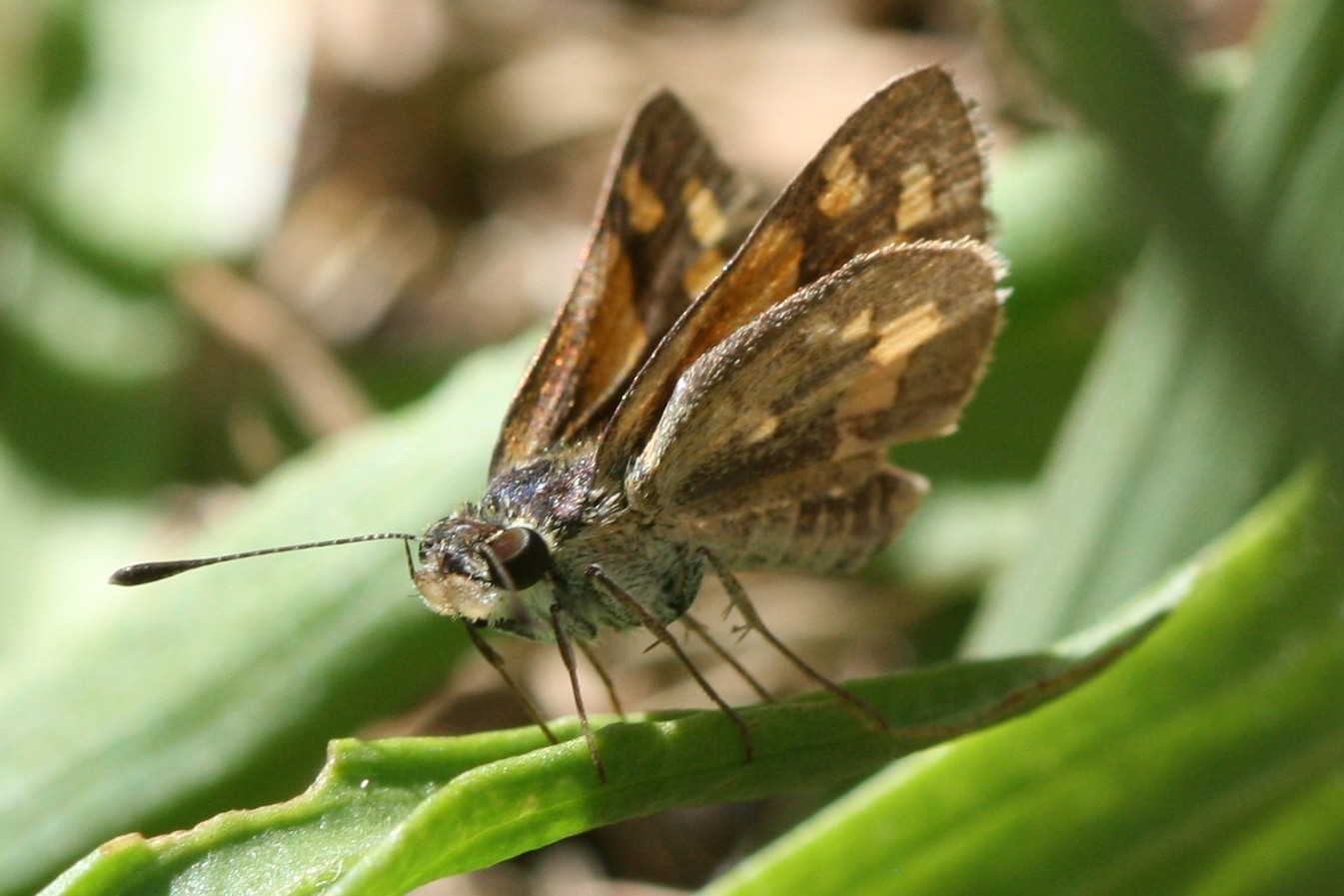

The wingspan is about 20 mm.

The larvae feed on Cymbopogon citrata, Paspalum urvillei, Urochloa decumbens, Sorghum verticilliflorum, Paspalum conjugatum, Panicum maximum and Oryza sativa. It constructs a tubular shelter made of the leaves of its host plant.
