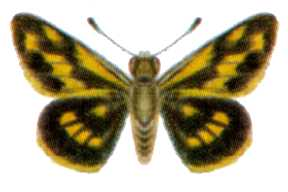

Scientific classification
- Kingdom: Animalia
- Phylum: Arthropoda
- Class: Insecta
- Order: Lepidoptera
- Family: Hesperiidae
- Genus: Taractrocera
- Species: T. dolon

Binomial name
- Taractrocera dolon (Plötz, 1884)

Synonyms
- Apaustus dolon Plötz, 1884

= Taractrocera dolon =

Species of butterfly

Taractrocera dolon, the sandy grass-dart, is a butterfly of the family Hesperiidae. It is found in Australia in the Northern Territory, Queensland and New South Wales as well as Papua New Guinea.

The wingspan is about 20 mm.

The larvae feed on Sorghum verticilliflorum.

== Subspecies ==
- Taractrocera dolon diomedes Waterhouse, 1933 (Northern Territory)
- Taractrocera dolon dolon (Plötz, 1884) (New South Wales, Queensland, Papua New Guinea, Louisiade Archipelago)
