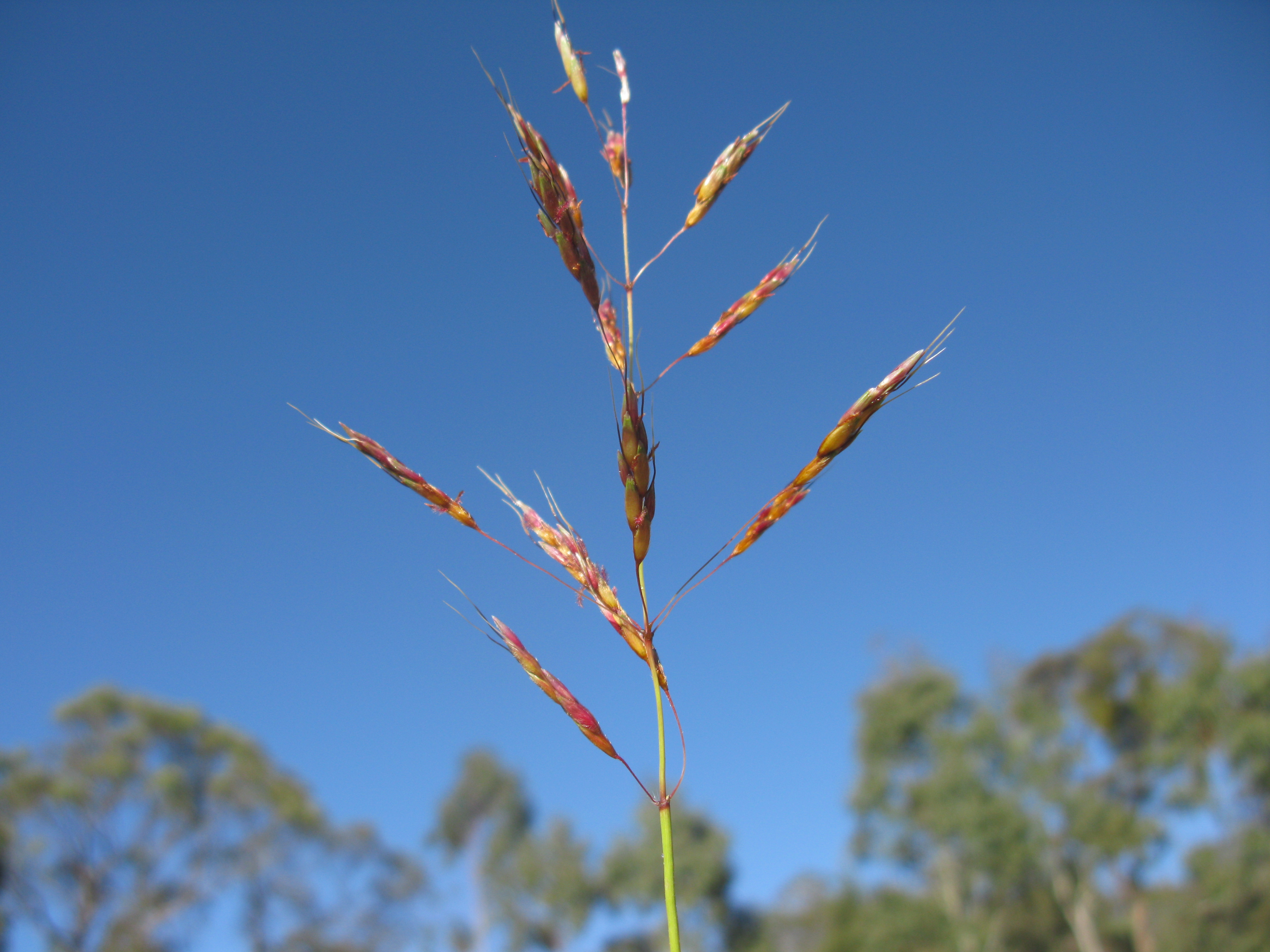

Scientific classification
- Kingdom: Plantae
- Clade: Tracheophytes
- Clade: Angiosperms
- Clade: Monocots
- Clade: Commelinids
- Order: Poales
- Family: Poaceae
- Subfamily: Panicoideae
- Genus: Sorghum
- Species: S. leiocladum

Binomial name
- Sorghum leiocladum (Hack.) C.E.Hubb.

= Sorghum leiocladum =

Species of grass

Sorghum leiocladum (also known as wild sorghum) is a grass plant in the family Poaceae that is found in eastern and northern Australia.
