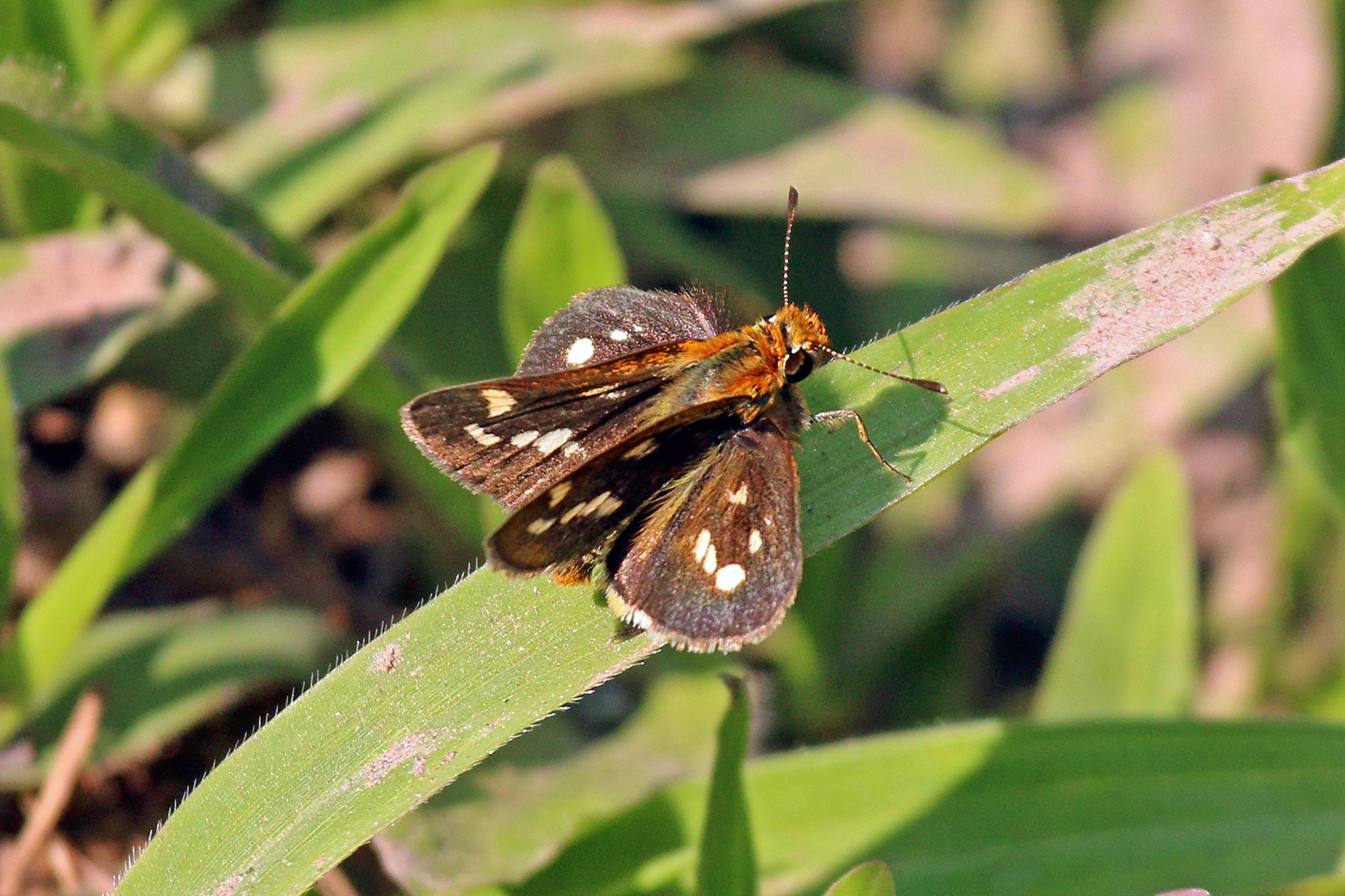
- Danum Valley, Borneo

Scientific classification
- Kingdom: Animalia
- Phylum: Arthropoda
- Clade: Pancrustacea
- Class: Insecta
- Order: Lepidoptera
- Family: Hesperiidae
- Genus: Taractrocera
- Species: T. ardonia

Binomial name
- Taractrocera ardonia (Hewitson, 1868)

Synonyms
- Ancyloxipha ardonia Hewitson, 1868

= Taractrocera ardonia =

Species of butterfly

Taractrocera ardonia is a butterfly of the family Hesperiidae. It is found in Malaysia, (Malay Peninsula, Sarawak, Sabah), Brunei, and Indonesia (Kalimantan, and southern Sulawesi).

== Subspecies ==
- Taractrocera ardonia ardonia (Sulawesi, including Salayar)
- Taractrocera ardonia sumatrensis Evans, 1926 (Malaysia Peninsula and Borneo). [= Taractrocera sumatrensis lamia Evans, 1934]
