= Sorghum intrans =

Scientific classification
- Kingdom: Plantae
- Clade: Tracheophytes
- Clade: Angiosperms
- Clade: Monocots
- Clade: Commelinids
- Order: Poales
- Family: Poaceae
- Subfamily: Panicoideae
- Genus: Sorghum
- Species: S. intrans

Binomial name
- Sorghum intrans Benth.

Species of plant

Sorghum intrans, commonly known as Darwin canegrass, is a species of grass native to the Northern Territory and Western Australia.
