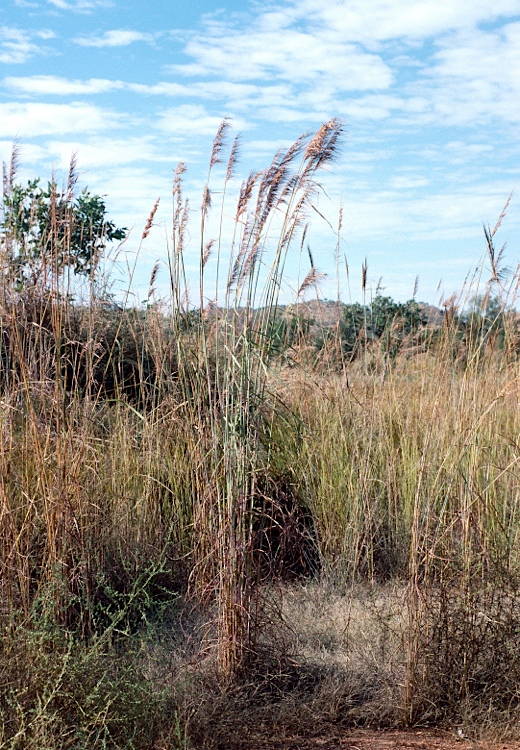

Scientific classification
- Kingdom: Plantae
- Clade: Tracheophytes
- Clade: Angiosperms
- Clade: Monocots
- Clade: Commelinids
- Order: Poales
- Family: Poaceae
- Subfamily: Panicoideae
- Genus: Sarga
- Species: S. stipoidea

Binomial name
- Sarga stipoidea Ewart & Jean White

Synonyms
- Andropogon sargus Ewart; Andropogon stipoideus (Ewart & Jean White) C.A.Gardner; Chrysopogon stipoideus (Ewart & Jean White) Domin; Sorghum mjoebergii Cheel; Sorghum stipoideum (Ewart & Jean White) C.A.Gardner & C.E.Hubb.

= Sarga stipoidea =

Species of plant

Sarga stipoidea is a species of flowering plant in the grass family Poaceae, native to seasonally dry tropical areas of northern and central Australia. It can grow on very poor soils and reaches heights of 10 to 14 ft (3 to 4 m).
