= Taractrocera trikora =

Scientific classification
- Kingdom: Animalia
- Phylum: Arthropoda
- Class: Insecta
- Order: Lepidoptera
- Family: Hesperiidae
- Genus: Taractrocera
- Species: T. trikora

Binomial name
- Taractrocera trikora de Jong, 2004

Species of butterfly

Taractrocera trikora is a butterfly of the family Hesperiidae. It is only known from the area around Lake Habbema in New Guinea.

The habitat at the type locality consists of moorland, fens and sparse coniferous forest, and high mountain moss forests.

The length of the forewings is 9.6-11.8 mm.
