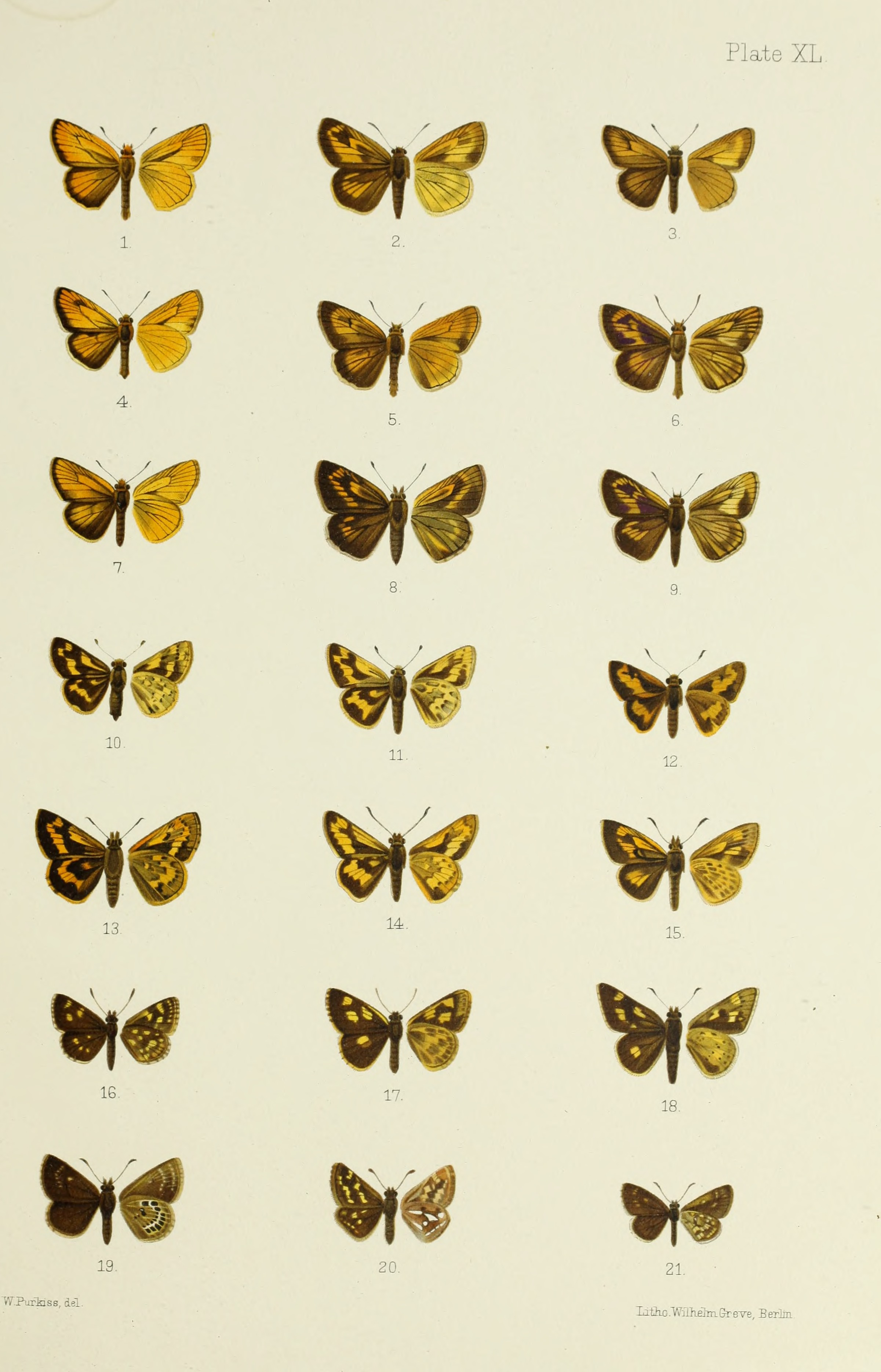
- Taractrocera flavoides in Leech Butterflies from China, Japan, and Corea (1892) 10 female, 11 male

Scientific classification
- Kingdom: Animalia
- Phylum: Arthropoda
- Class: Insecta
- Order: Lepidoptera
- Family: Hesperiidae
- Genus: Taractrocera
- Species: T. flavoides

Binomial name
- Taractrocera flavoides Leech, 1894

= Taractrocera flavoides =

Species of butterfly

Taractrocera flavoides is a butterfly of the family Hesperiidae. It is only known from the Chinese provinces of Sichuan (and neighbouring Tibet) and Yunnan.
