= Taractrocera fusca =

Scientific classification
- Kingdom: Animalia
- Phylum: Arthropoda
- Class: Insecta
- Order: Lepidoptera
- Family: Hesperiidae
- Genus: Taractrocera
- Species: T. fusca

Binomial name
- Taractrocera fusca de Jong, 2004

Species of butterfly

Taractrocera fusca is a butterfly of the family Hesperiidae. It is only known from the Western Highlands in New Guinea.
