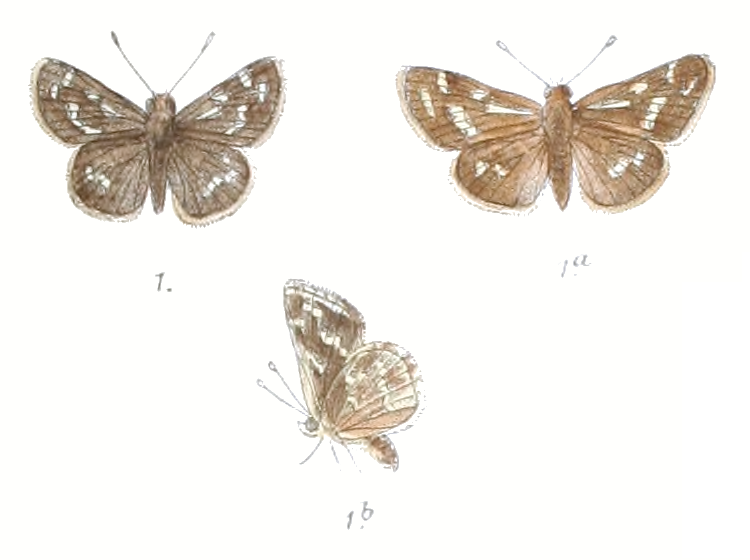
- Taractrocera maevius

Scientific classification
- Kingdom: Animalia
- Phylum: Arthropoda
- Class: Insecta
- Order: Lepidoptera
- Family: Hesperiidae
- Tribe: Taractrocerini
- Genus: Taractrocera; Butler, [1870]

= Taractrocera =

Genus of butterflies

Taractrocera is a genus of skippers in the family Hesperiidae.

== Species ==
- Taractrocera anisomorpha (Lower, 1911)
- Taractrocera archias (Felder, 1860)
- Taractrocera ardonia (Hewitson, 1868)
- Taractrocera ceramas (Hewitson, 1868)
- Taractrocera danna (Moore, 1865)
- Taractrocera dolon (Plötz, 1884)
- Taractrocera flavoides Leech, 1893
- Taractrocera fusca de Jong, 2004
- Taractrocera ilia Waterhouse, 1932
- Taractrocera ina Waterhouse, 1932
- Taractrocera luzonensis (Snellen, 1889)
- Taractrocera maevius (Fabricius, 1793)
- Taractrocera nigrolimbata (Snellen, 1889)
- Taractrocera papyria (Boisduval, 1832)
- Taractrocera tilda Evans, 1934
- Taractrocera trikora de Jong, 2004

== Biology ==
The larvae feed on Gramineae including Bambusa, Oryza
