= Taractrocera tilda =

Scientific classification
- Kingdom: Animalia
- Phylum: Arthropoda
- Class: Insecta
- Order: Lepidoptera
- Family: Hesperiidae
- Genus: Taractrocera
- Species: T. tilda

Binomial name
- Taractrocera tilda Evans, 1934

Species of butterfly

Taractrocera tilda is a butterfly of the family Hesperiidae. It is only known from the Chinese provinces of Sichuan and Yunnan.
