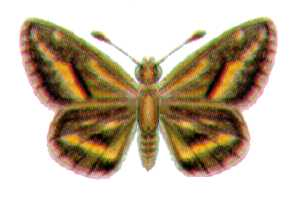

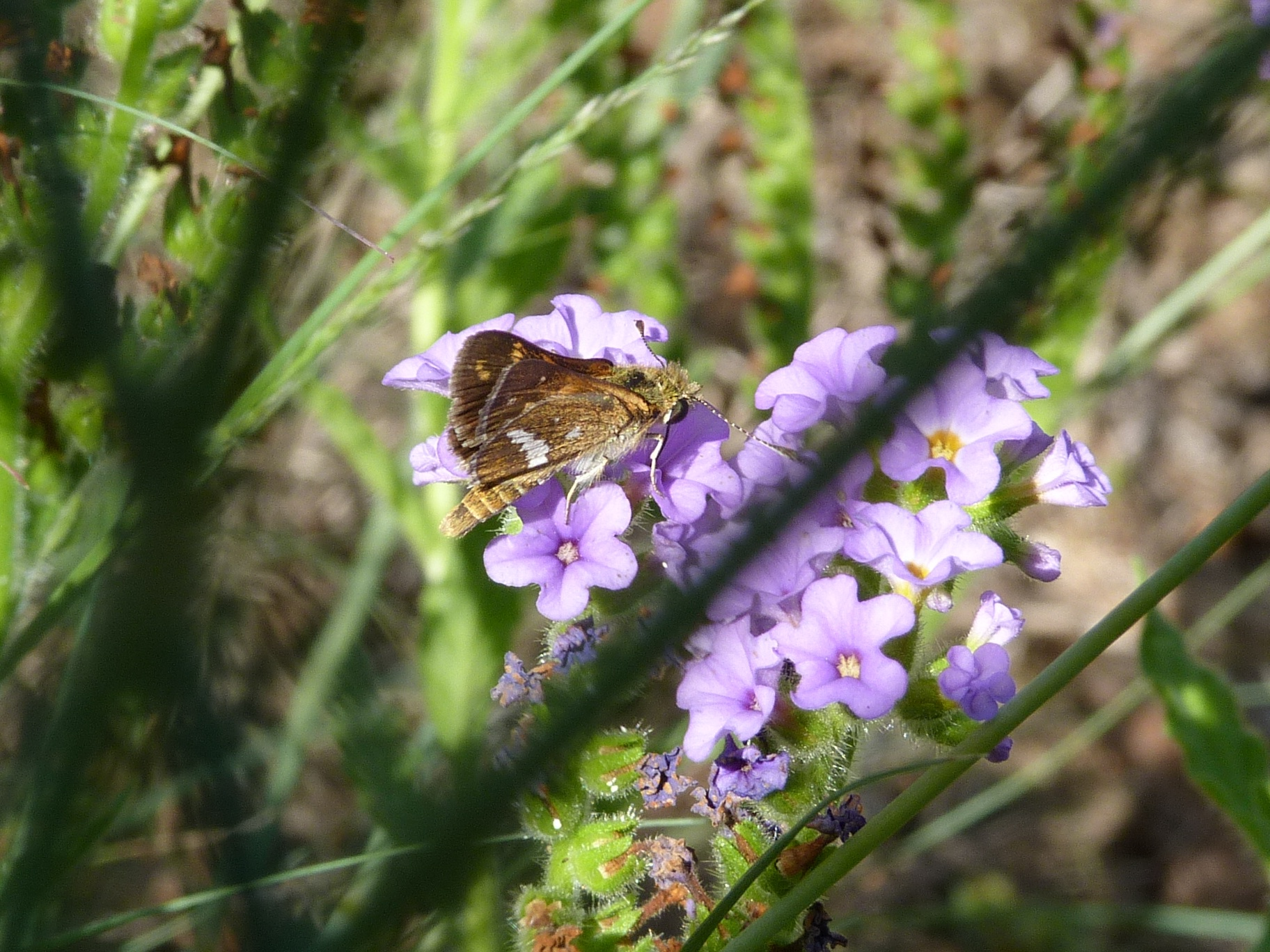

Scientific classification
- Kingdom: Animalia
- Phylum: Arthropoda
- Class: Insecta
- Order: Lepidoptera
- Family: Hesperiidae
- Genus: Taractrocera
- Species: T. papyria

Binomial name
- Taractrocera papyria (Boisduval, [1832])

Synonyms
- Hesperia papyria Boisduval, 1832; Taractrocera celaeno Cox, 1873; Hesperilla fumosa Guest, 1882; Apaustus alix Plötz, 1884; Apaustus minimus Miskin, 1889; Ancyloxipha agraulia Hewitson, 1868

= Taractrocera papyria =

Species of butterfly

Taractrocera papyria, the white-banded grass-dart, is a butterfly of the family Hesperiidae. It is found in the Australian Capital Territory, New South Wales, Queensland, South Australia, Tasmania, Victoria and Western Australia.

The wingspan is about 30 mm.

The Western Australian subspecies lacks the white markings of the nominate species.

The larvae feed on Phragmites australis, Microlaena stipoides, Imperata cylindrica, Echinopogon caespitosus, Cynodon dactylon, Austrostipa scabra, Austrodanthonia, Carex gaudichaudiana, Paspalum dilatatum, Oryza sativa, Pennisetum clandestinum, Ehrharta longiflora, Ehrharta calycina and Poa species. It constructs a shelter in which pupation takes place.

== Subspecies ==
- Taractrocera papyria agraulia (Hewitson, 1868) - western grass-dart (south-western Australia)
- Taractrocera papyria papyria (Boisduval, 1832) (Lord Howe Island, eastern and south-eastern Australian and Tasmania)
