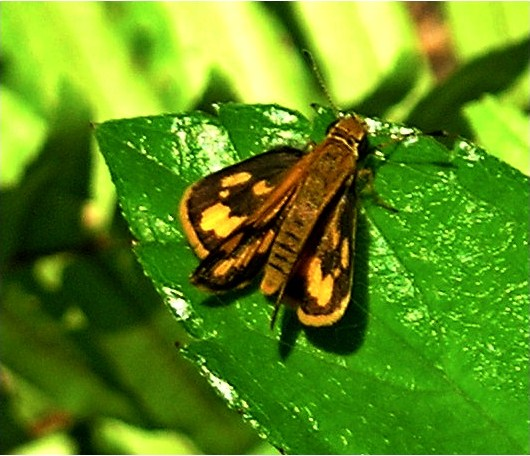

Scientific classification
- Kingdom: Animalia
- Phylum: Arthropoda
- Clade: Pancrustacea
- Class: Insecta
- Order: Lepidoptera
- Family: Hesperiidae
- Genus: Taractrocera
- Species: T. luzonensis

Binomial name
- Taractrocera luzonensis (Staudinger, 1889)

Synonyms
- Pamphila luzonensis Staudinger, 1889; Taractrocera zenia Evans, 1934; Thymelicus ziclea Plötz, 1884

= Taractrocera luzonensis =

Species of butterfly

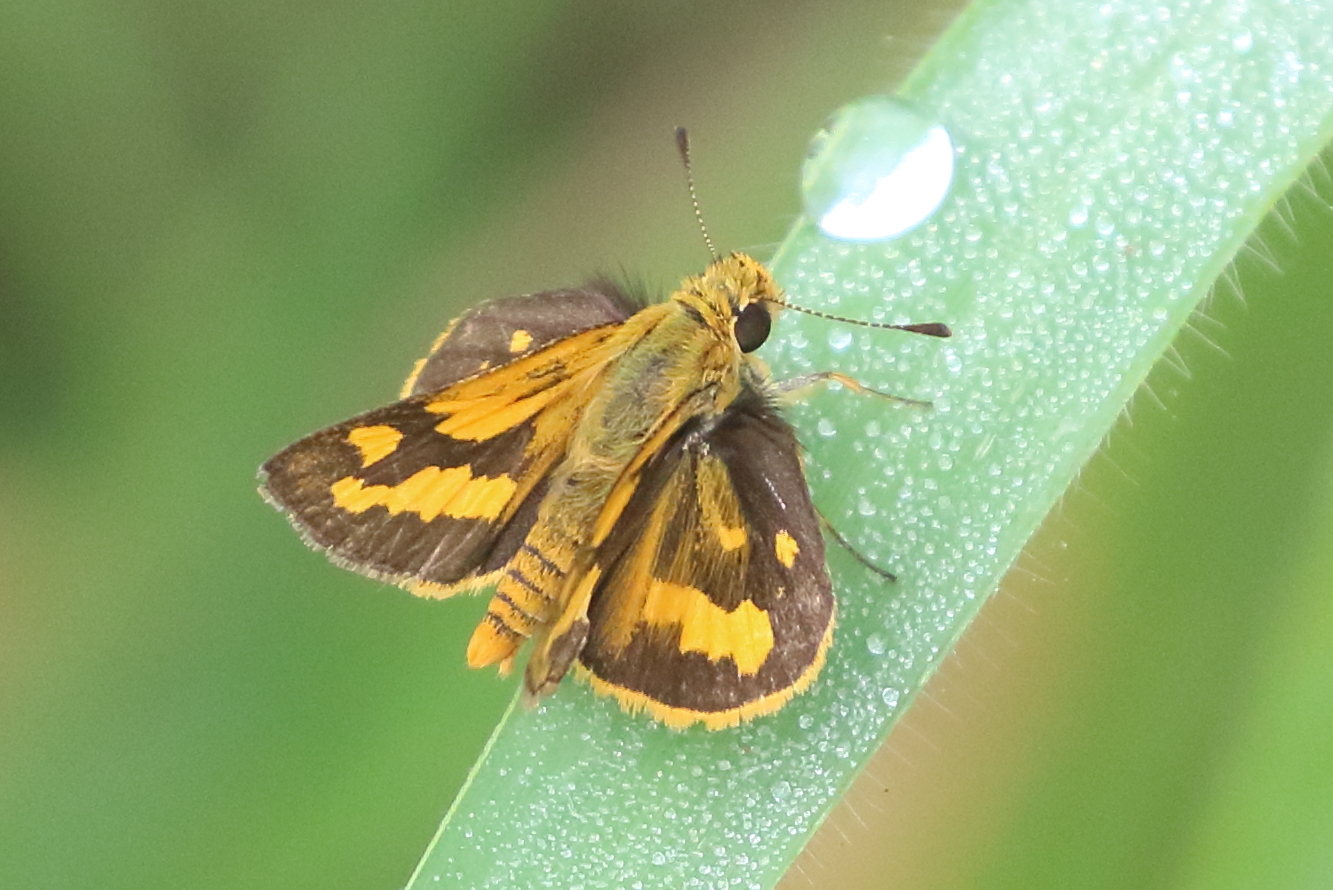
Taractrocera luzonensis, Pilipinas / Philippines

Taractrocera luzonensis is a butterfly of the family Hesperiidae. It is found from south-western Burma and northern Thailand through Malaysia, Sumatra, Borneo and the Philippines to Sulawesi and neighbouring islands.

The length of the forewings is 10.1-12.1 mm.

== Subspecies ==
- Taractrocera luzonensis luzonensis (the Philippines)
- Taractrocera luzonensis zenia Evans, 1934 (southern Burma, southern Thailand)
- Taractrocera luzonensis tissara Fruhstorfer, 1910 (Sumatra and islands to the west)
- Taractrocera luzonensis stella Evans, 1934 (Borneo and nearby islands)
- Taractrocera luzonensis dongola Evans, 1932 (Sulawesi and Sula Archipelago)
- Taractrocera luzonensis bessa Evans, 1949 (islands to the south of Sulawesi (Salayar, Tukanbesi, Tanahjampea) and probably also in southern Sulawesi)
