= Sorghum macrospermum =

Scientific classification
- Kingdom: Plantae
- Clade: Tracheophytes
- Clade: Angiosperms
- Clade: Monocots
- Clade: Commelinids
- Order: Poales
- Family: Poaceae
- Subfamily: Panicoideae
- Genus: Sorghum
- Species: S. macrospermum

Binomial name
- Sorghum macrospermum E.D.Garber

Synonyms
- Vacoparis macrosperma (E.D.Garber) Spangler

Species of plant

Sorghum macrospermum, the Katherine sorghum, is a species of flowering plant in the family Poaceae, endemic only to limestone outcrops in the Katherine River area of the Northern Territory of Australia. A diploid, as a crop wild relative of Sorghum bicolor it is being studied for its resistance to various pest species.
