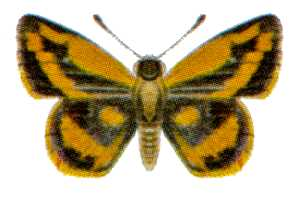

Scientific classification
- Kingdom: Animalia
- Phylum: Arthropoda
- Class: Insecta
- Order: Lepidoptera
- Family: Hesperiidae
- Genus: Taractrocera
- Species: T. ilia

Binomial name
- Taractrocera ilia Waterhouse, 1932

Synonyms
- Taractrocera udraka ilia Waterhouse, 1932

= Taractrocera ilia =

Species of butterfly

Taractrocera ilia, the northern grass-dart or rock grass-dart, is a butterfly of the family Hesperiidae. It is found in Irian Jaya, Australia's Northern Territory (Darwin and Melville Island) and Papua New Guinea (Morobe, Madang, East Sepik and Western Highlands).

The wingspan is about 20 mm.

== Subspecies ==
- Taractrocera ilia ilia Waterhouse, 1932 (Northern Territory)
- Taractrocera ilia beta Evans, 1934 (Papua New Guinea)
