= Sorghum virgatum =

Conservation status
- Least Concern (IUCN 3.1)

Scientific classification
- Kingdom: Plantae
- Clade: Tracheophytes
- Clade: Angiosperms
- Clade: Monocots
- Clade: Commelinids
- Order: Poales
- Family: Poaceae
- Subfamily: Panicoideae
- Genus: Sorghum
- Species: S. virgatum

Binomial name
- Sorghum virgatum (Hack.) Stapf

Synonyms
- Andropogon sorghum var. virgatus Hack.; Holcus virgatus (Hack.) L.H.Bailey; Sorghum bicolor var. virgatum (Hack.) de Wet & Harlan

Species of plant

Sorghum virgatum, Tunis grass, is a species of flowering plant in the family Poaceae. It is found across the Sahel region, up the Nile valley, and on to the Levant, and has been introduced to Morocco and Ethiopia. It contributed genetic material during the creation of domesticated sorghum, Sorghum bicolor.
