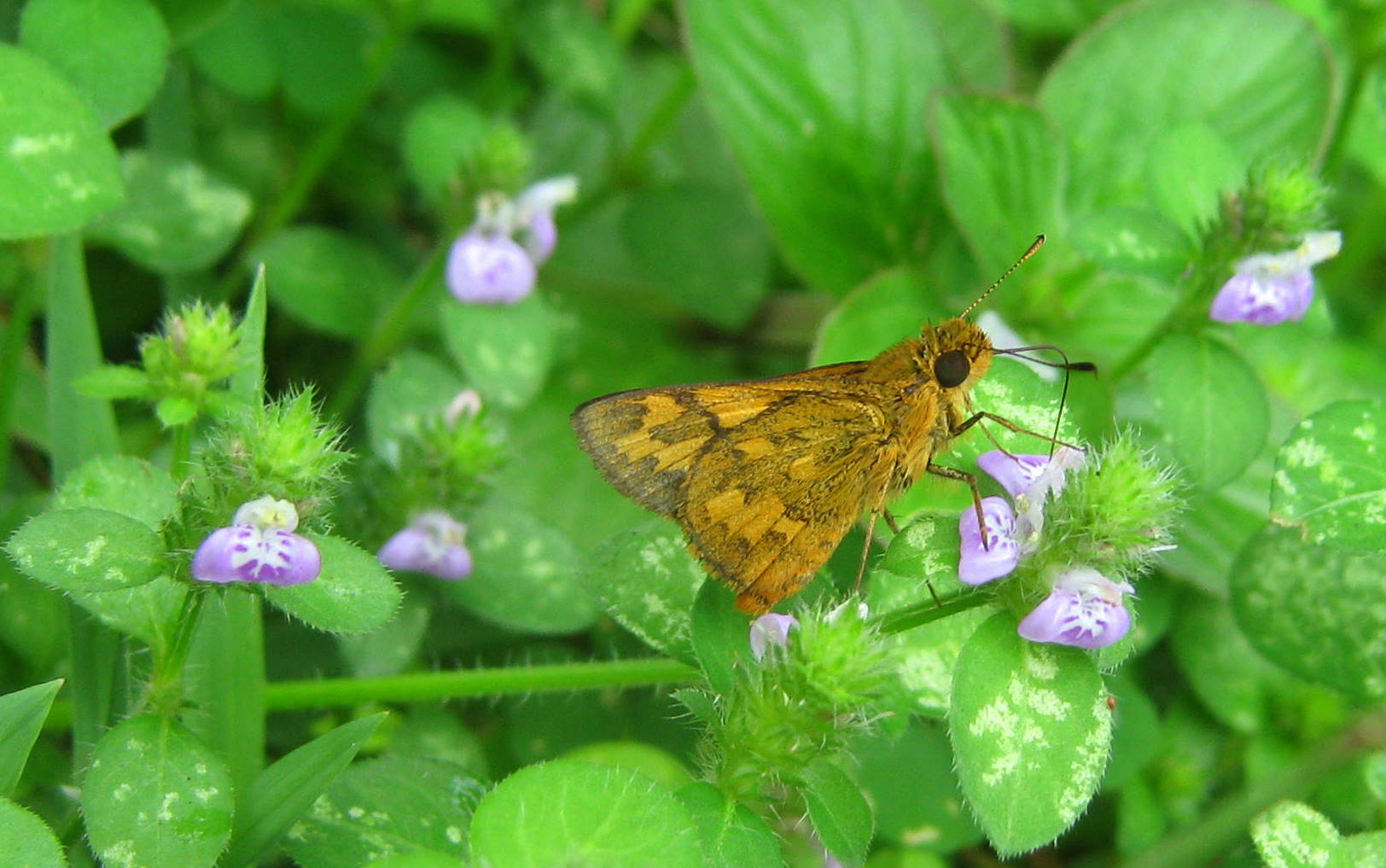

Scientific classification
- Kingdom: Animalia
- Phylum: Arthropoda
- Class: Insecta
- Order: Lepidoptera
- Family: Hesperiidae
- Genus: Taractrocera
- Species: T. archias

Binomial name
- Taractrocera archias (Felder, 1860)

Synonyms
- Pamphila archias C. Felder, 1860

= Taractrocera archias =

Species of butterfly

Taractrocera archias is a butterfly of the family Hesperiidae. It is found in mainland south-eastern Asia (Burma, Thailand, Vietnam, Malaysia), Java and Lesser Sunda Islands (east to Timor and Kisar).

== Subspecies ==
- Taractrocera archias archias (Java, Bali and Banka)
- Taractrocera archias samadha Fruhstorfer, 1910 (northern Burma)
- Taractrocera archias quinta Swinhoe, 1913 (from Burma to Indochina and Malaya)
- Taractrocera archias kisaga Frustorfer, 1910 (Lesser Sunda Islands)
- Taractrocera archias bavius Mabille, 1891 (Lesser Sunda Islands)
