= Sorghum purpureosericeum =

Conservation status
- Least Concern (IUCN 3.1)

Scientific classification
- Kingdom: Plantae
- Clade: Embryophytes
- Clade: Tracheophytes
- Clade: Angiosperms
- Clade: Monocots
- Clade: Commelinids
- Order: Poales
- Family: Poaceae
- Subfamily: Panicoideae
- Genus: Sorghum
- Species: S. purpureosericeum

Binomial name
- Sorghum purpureosericeum (Hochst. ex A.Rich.) Schweinf. & Asch.

Synonyms
- Andropogon pappii Gand. Andropogon purpureosericeus Hochst. ex A.Rich. Sarga purpureosericea (Hochst. ex A.Rich.) Spangler; Sorghum deccanense Stapf ex Raizada; Sorghum dimidiatum Stapf

Species of plant

Sorghum purpureosericeum is a species of plant in the grass family, Poaceae, that occurs in central and eastern Africa, Yemen and India.
