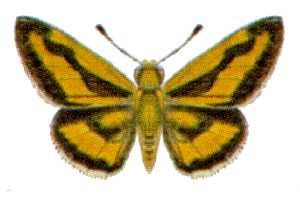

Scientific classification
- Kingdom: Animalia
- Phylum: Arthropoda
- Class: Insecta
- Order: Lepidoptera
- Family: Hesperiidae
- Genus: Taractrocera
- Species: T. anisomorpha

Binomial name
- Taractrocera anisomorpha (Lower, 1911)

Synonyms
- Bibla anisomorpha Lower, 1911

= Taractrocera anisomorpha =

Species of butterfly

Taractrocera anisomorpha, the large yellow grass-dart or orange grass-dart, is a butterfly of the family Hesperiidae. It is found in the Northern Territory, Queensland and Western Australia.

The habitat consists of open eucalypt forests.

The wingspan is about 20 mm.

The larvae feed on Setaria paspalidioides, Eulalia aurea and Sorghum bicolor.
