= Taractrocera nigrolimbata =

Scientific classification
- Kingdom: Animalia
- Phylum: Arthropoda
- Clade: Pancrustacea
- Class: Insecta
- Order: Lepidoptera
- Family: Hesperiidae
- Genus: Taractrocera
- Species: T. nigrolimbata

Binomial name
- Taractrocera nigrolimbata (Snellen, 1876)

Synonyms
- Hesperia aliena Plötz, 1883

Species of butterfly

Taractrocera nigrolimbata is a butterfly of the family Hesperiidae. It is found in Malaysia, Vietnam (Saigon), Sumatra, Java, the Lesser Sunda Islands (east to Sumba), and southern Sulawesi.

== Subspecies ==
- Taractrocera nigrolimbata nigrolimbata (Indochina to Java)
- Taractrocera nigrolimbata talanta (Plötz, 1885) (eastern Java, Lesser Sunda Islands and southern Sulawesi)
