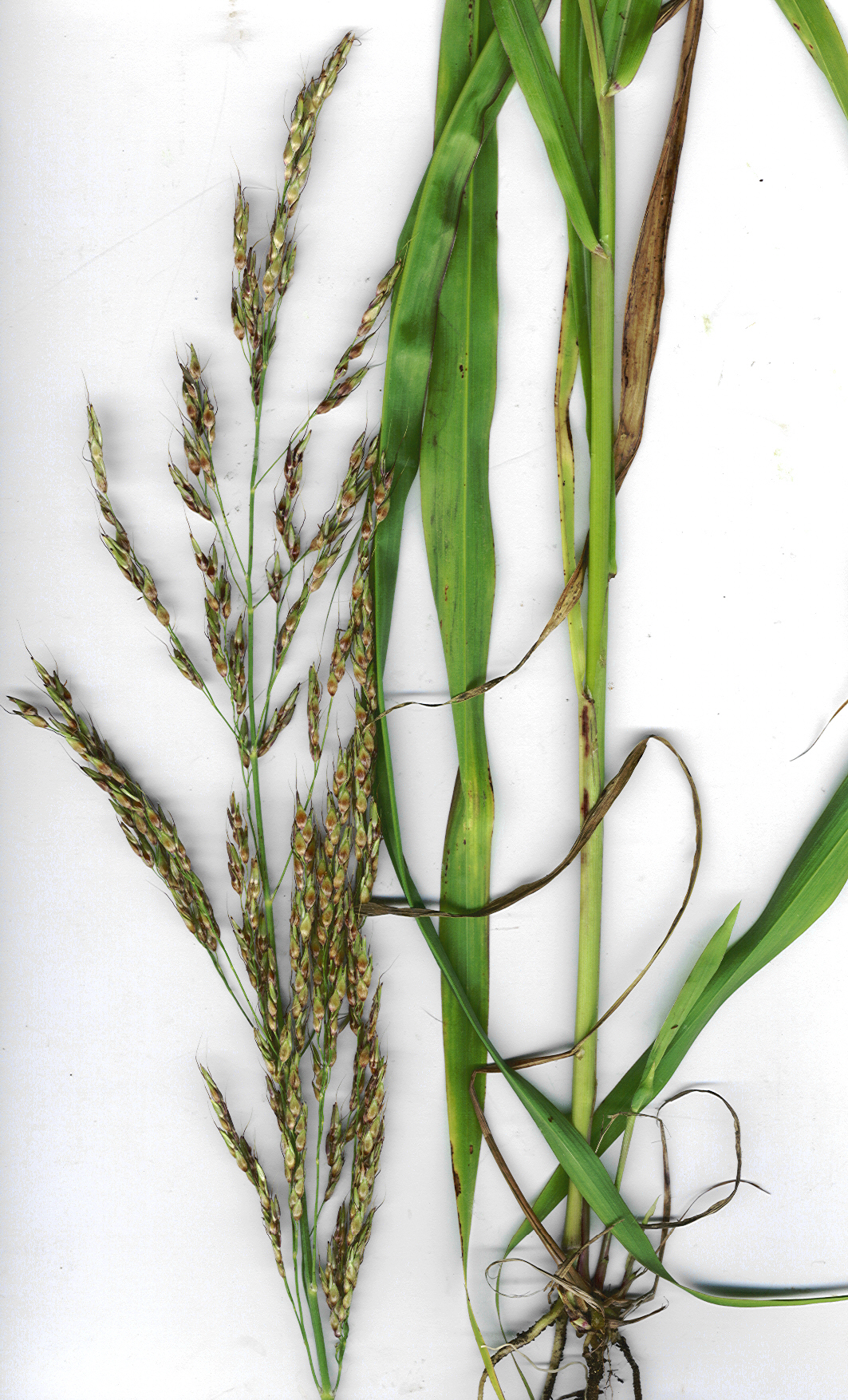

Scientific classification
- Kingdom: Plantae
- Clade: Tracheophytes
- Clade: Angiosperms
- Clade: Monocots
- Clade: Commelinids
- Order: Poales
- Family: Poaceae
- Subfamily: Panicoideae
- Genus: Sorghum
- Species: S. halepense

Binomial name
- Sorghum halepense (L.) Pers.

= Johnson grass =

Species of plant

Johnson grass or Johnsongrass, Sorghum halepense, is a plant in the grass family, Poaceae, native to Asia and northern Africa. The plant has been introduced to all continents except Antarctica, and most larger islands and archipelagos. It reproduces by rhizomes and seeds.

Johnson grass has been used for forage and to stop erosion, but it is often considered a weed because:

- Foliage that becomes wilted from frost or hot, dry weather can contain sufficient amounts of hydrogen cyanide to kill cattle and horses if it is eaten in quantity.
- The foliage can cause 'bloat' in such herbivores from the accumulation of excessive nitrates; otherwise, it is edible.
- It grows and spreads rapidly, it can 'choke out' other cash crops planted by farmers.

This species occurs in crop fields, pastures, abandoned fields, rights-of-way, forest edges, and along streambanks. It thrives in open, disturbed, rich, bottom ground, particularly in cultivated fields. Johnson grass that is resistant to the common herbicide glyphosate has been found in Argentina and the United States. It is considered to be one of the ten worst weeds in the world. In the United States, Johnson grass is listed as either a noxious or quarantined weed in 19 states. With Sorghum bicolor it is a parent of Sorghum × almum, a forage crop also considered a weed in places.

It is named after an Alabama plantation owner, Colonel William Johnson, who sowed its seeds on river-bottom farm land circa 1840. The plant was already established in several US states a decade earlier, having been introduced as a prospective forage or accidentally as a seedlot contaminant.

In early 20th century Talladega County, Alabama, feelings about Johnson grass were mixed. It was considered a nutritious, palatable, and productive forage, but many farmers still found it undesirable. Fields of this grass fell into a "sod bound" state of insufficient new growth unless they were plowed every two or three seasons.

A genetic study employing microsatellite markers has investigated Johnsongrass populations across 12 US states and confirmed that the weed was introduced to US from Alabama and North Carolina. Moreover, the study also detected an unreported independent introduction from Arizona. After trans-continental railroad building the two founding populations began to intermix at around Texas shifting diversity from centers of introduction.

The 1889 book The Useful Native Plants of Australia records that Sorghum halepense is a "strong, erect-growing species, varying from two to ten feet high, succulent when young, a splendid grass for a cattle run, though not much sought after by sheep. It is a free seeder. The settlers on the banks of the Hawkesbury (New South Wales) look upon it as a recent importation, and seed of it has been distributed under the name of Panicum speciabile. (WooUs) Coast of Queensland, New South Wales, and Western Australia."

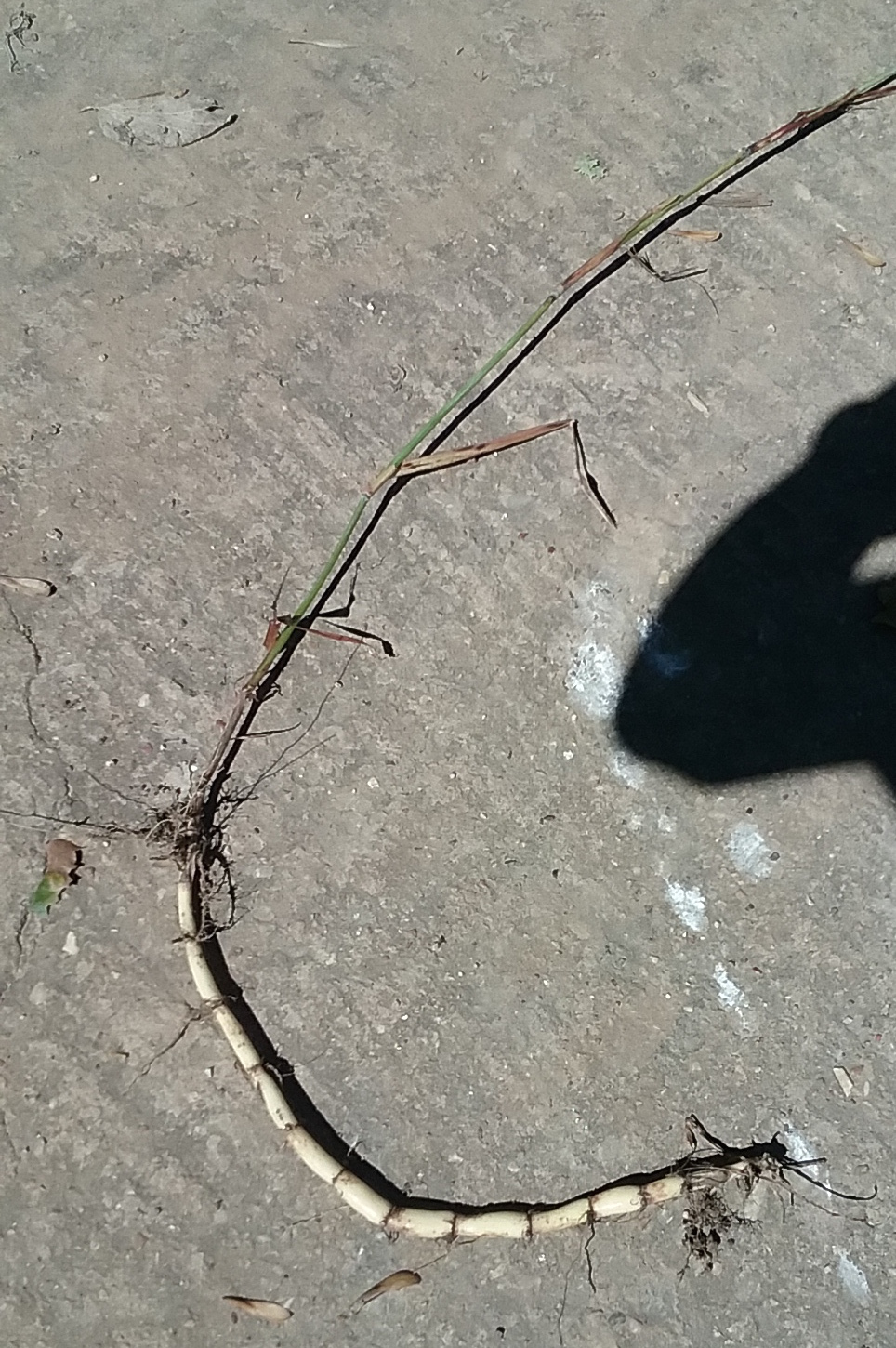
A rhizome of Sorghum halepense
