= Sarga trichoclada =

Scientific classification
- Kingdom: Plantae
- Clade: Tracheophytes
- Clade: Angiosperms
- Clade: Monocots
- Clade: Commelinids
- Order: Poales
- Family: Poaceae
- Subfamily: Panicoideae
- Genus: Sarga
- Species: S. trichoclada

Binomial name
- Sarga trichoclada (Rupr. ex Hack.) Spangler

Species of grass

Sarga trichoclada or Sorghum trichocladum (changed to Sarga based on phylogenetic work) is a perennial grass with a seasonally dry tropical biome habitat, with a distribution from West to South Mexico to Honduras. It belongs to the phylum of Angiosperms.

== Uses and benefits ==
This flowering plant is often used in traditional medicine for treating various ailments. It can also be used to decorate and is widely used as an ornamental flowering plant in most gardens.

== Seeds and flowers ==
The flower of this plant is very delicate, and is small yellow, green spikelet decorated with a single floret. The seed is quite small and is dark brown. The seedlings themselves are very thin, with a small leaf.

== Cultivation and propagation ==
It is often propagated by seed or division. It prefers full and well-drained soil. Within the aspect of cultivation, you should water it regularly during the growing season and fertilize it using a balanced fertilizer.
