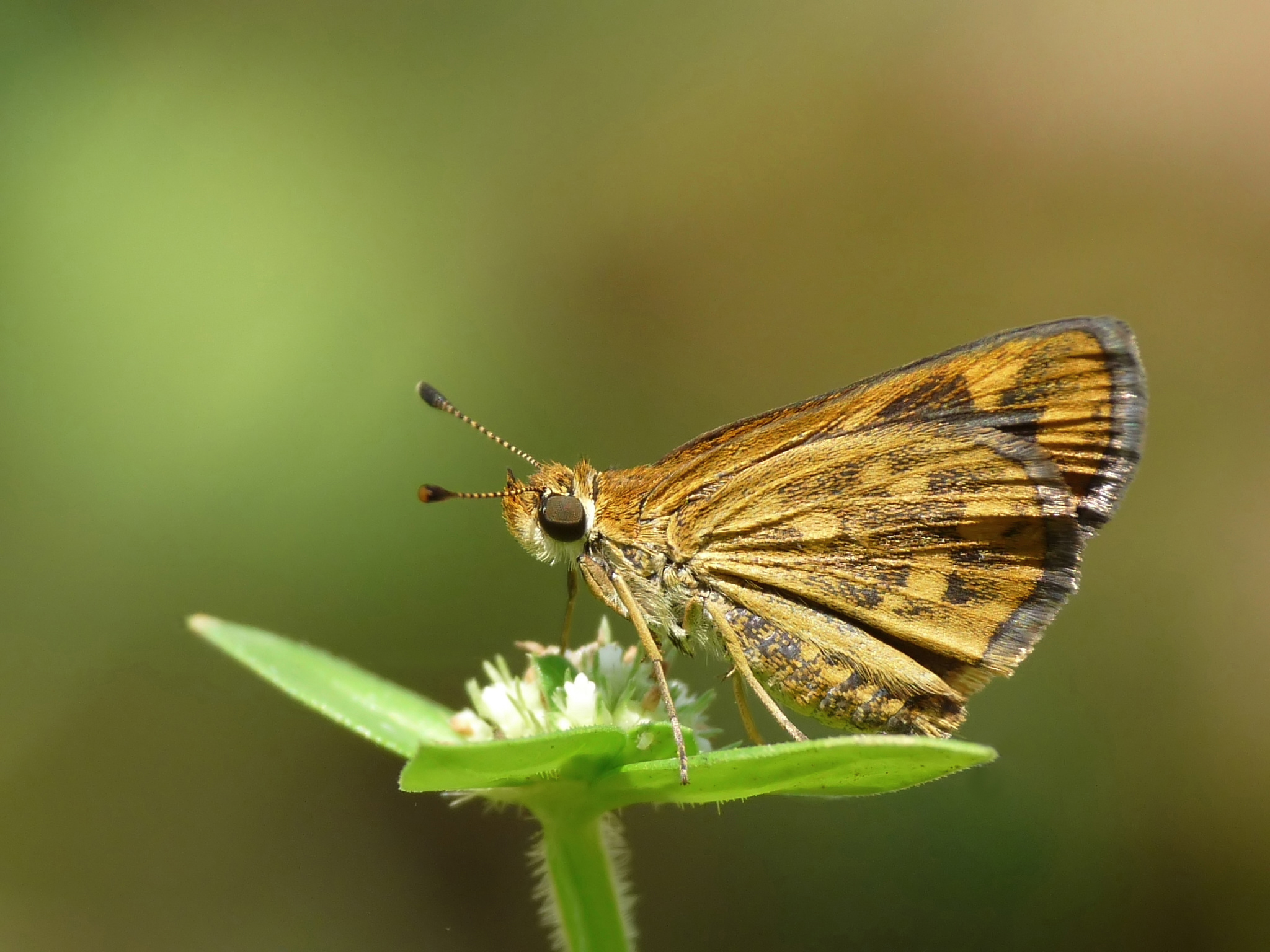
- Underside of wings

Scientific classification
- Kingdom: Animalia
- Phylum: Arthropoda
- Class: Insecta
- Order: Lepidoptera
- Family: Hesperiidae
- Genus: Taractrocera
- Species: T. ceramas

Binomial name
- Taractrocera ceramas (Hewitson, 1868)

= Taractrocera ceramas =

Tamil grass dart

Species of butterfly

Taractrocera ceramas, commonly known as the Tamil grass dart, is a species of butterfly belonging to the family Hesperiidae. It is found from the Western Ghats to Mumbai, in the hills of southern India, in northeast India to northern Burma and in south-eastern China.

== Description ==
Male. Upperside rufous-brown, with small orange spots. Forewing with eight spots, one in the cell, three conjoined from near the costa before the apex, two in the middle of the disc, and two close to the outer margin below the apex. Hindwing with two pairs of spots in the disc, one pair in the middle and the other near the apex. Cilia of both wings pale brown. Underside. Forewing blackish-brown, the spots as above, but paler and duller in colour, and there is a dull orange streak between the costa and sub costal vein. Hindwing paler, markings as above, but with an additional spot at the end of the cell, and the entire wing more or less covered with minute orange scales. Antennae black, the lower half of the club white at the sides, the shaft with white dots; palpi, head and body coucolorous with the wings; palpi grey beneath, the abdomen with obscure grey bands on the underside. Female like the male.

— Charles Swinhoe, Lepidoptera Indica. Vol. X

== Subspecies ==
- Taractrocera ceramas nicevillei Watson, 1893 (Maharashtra)
- Taractrocera ceramas oberthuri Elwes & Edwards, 1897 (Anaimalai Hills, Tamil Nadu)
- Taractrocera ceramas atropunctata Watson, 1896 (north-eastern India, northern Burma)
- Taractrocera ceramas ceramas (Nilgiris, Kerala, Tamil Nadu, part of Karnataka)
- Taractrocera ceramas media Evans, 1934 (Uttara Kannada, Goa)
- Taractrocera ceramas thelma Evans, 1934 (Kwang Si, China)

== Gallery ==
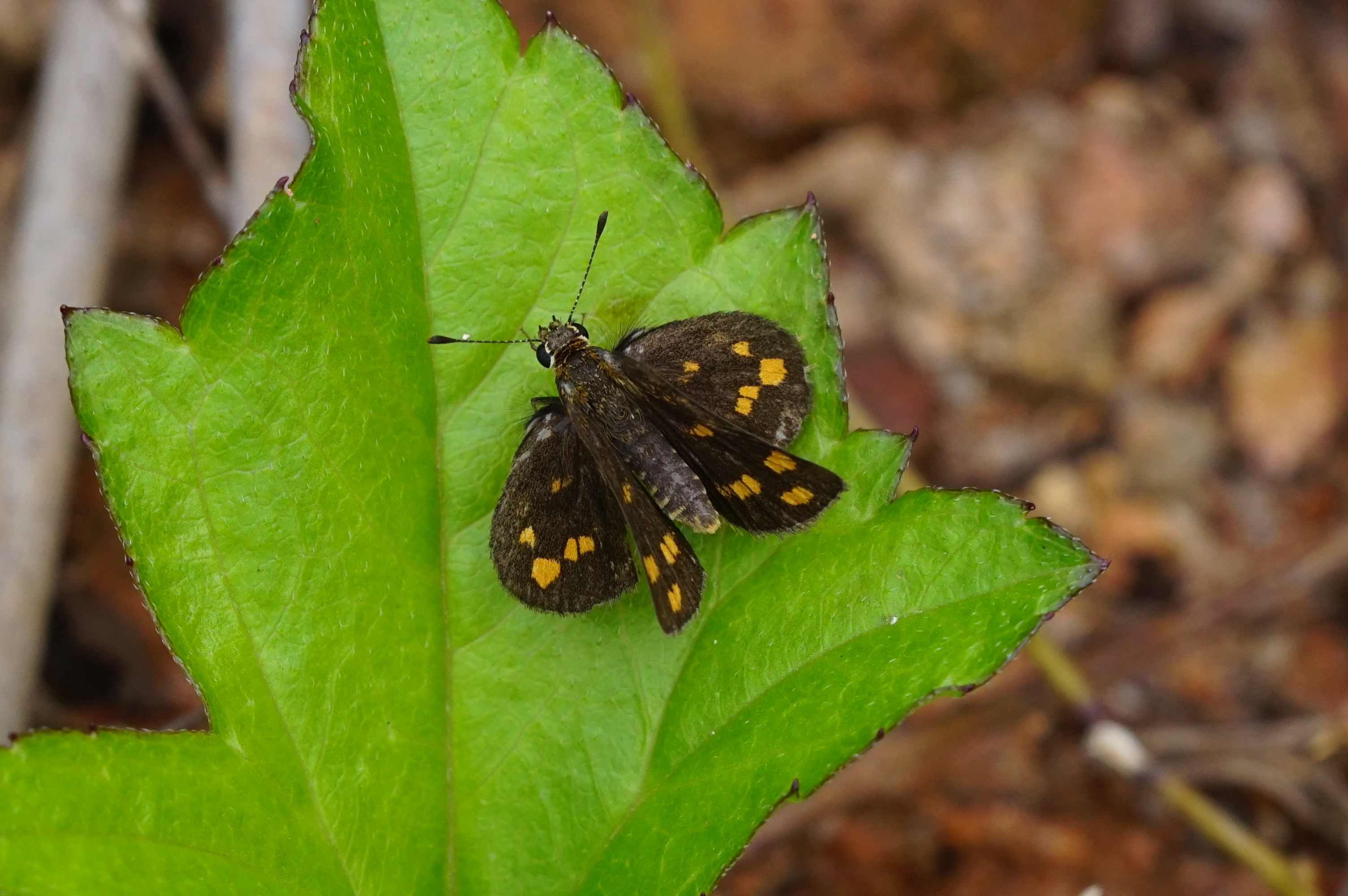
Dorsal surface of wings
