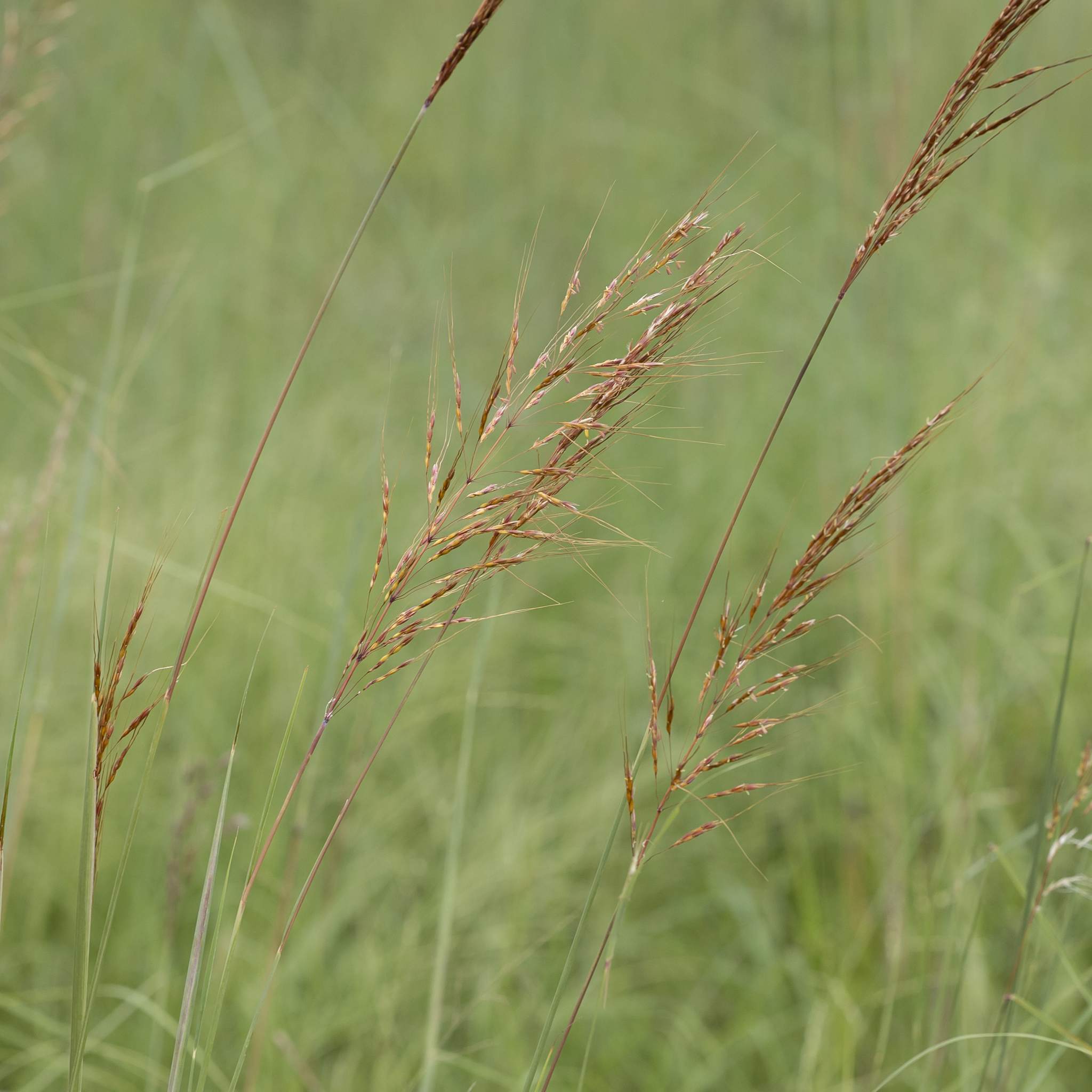

Scientific classification
- Kingdom: Plantae
- Clade: Tracheophytes
- Clade: Angiosperms
- Clade: Monocots
- Clade: Commelinids
- Order: Poales
- Family: Poaceae
- Subfamily: Panicoideae
- Genus: Sorghum
- Species: S. timorense

Binomial name
- Sorghum timorense (Kunth) Büse ex de Vriese

Synonyms
- Andropogon tropicus var. timorense Kunth (basionym) (homotypic synonym); Sarga timorensis (Kunth) Spangler (homotypic synonym); Sorghum australiense E.D.Garber & Snyder; S. brevicallosum E.D.Garber

= Sorghum timorense =

Species of plant

Sorghum timorense, commonly known as Downs sorghum, is an annual tropical Asian and Australasian grass native to the island of Timor, and Australia in the northern portions of the states of Northern Territory, Queensland, and Western Australia (flourishing in regions from Kimberley to Pilbara).

== Description ==
Culms (30–300 cm long × 7–13mm in diameter) are upright or abruptly bent, smooth or lightly frosted with powdery granules, but softly hairy to bearded at the nodes, with few lateral branches. Roots are not nodal, but may be partially above the soil level, somewhat propping the plant up. Leaf sheaths are either hairless or minutely pubescent, sometimes lacking oral hairs, or bearded. Ligule (1.3–3.5mm long) lacks cilia. Smooth, or lightly haired leaf-blades (30–60 cm long × 5–10mm wide) can be either straight, or curled, terminating into a thread-like form. If blade's surface has hairs, they arise from minute bumps (tubercles). The inflorescence is composed of a bunching, or slackly open panicle (15–40 cm long), with branches that each terminate in a single raceme. The panicle axis is smooth. Panicle branches are angular, or flat, appear to be covered with minute scabs, and are shaggy with long, weak hairs, and have enlarged pulvini; they are glabrous or bearded in the axils, and hairy at the tips. The primary branch of the panicle (2–11 cm long) lacks branchlets. Racemes bear only a few fertile spikelets (two to 10 fertile spikelets per raceme). Main stems (5–6 mm long between nodes) are straight, have cilia on their margins, break easily at the nodes, and end in an abrupt, slanting tip.
