= Sarga versicolor =

Scientific classification
- Kingdom: Plantae
- Clade: Tracheophytes
- Clade: Angiosperms
- Clade: Monocots
- Clade: Commelinids
- Order: Poales
- Family: Poaceae
- Subfamily: Panicoideae
- Genus: Sarga
- Species: S. versicolor

Binomial name
- Sarga versicolor (Andersson) Spangler

Species of plant

Sarga versicolor is a grass found to be closely related to the Sachrinae group or newly 're-defined' ‘Saccharum complex’ including Sarga and Sorghastrum based on phylogeny, even able to interbreed with some members. This species is found in Angola, Botswana, Burundi, Chad, Ethiopia, Kenya, KwaZulu-Natal, Malawi, Mozambique, Namibia, Northern Provinces, Oman, Somalia, Tanzania, Zambia, Zimbabwe.
