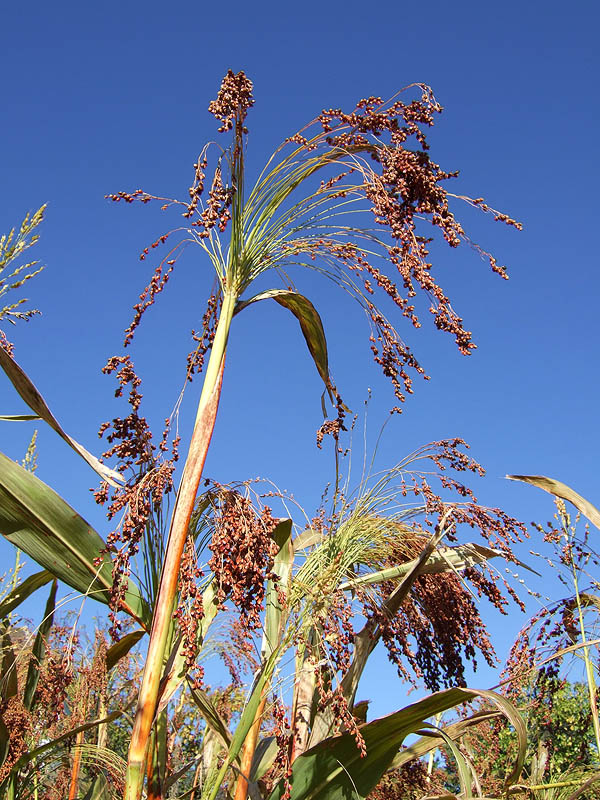
- Habit

Scientific classification
- Kingdom: Plantae
- Clade: Tracheophytes
- Clade: Angiosperms
- Clade: Monocots
- Clade: Commelinids
- Order: Poales
- Family: Poaceae
- Subfamily: Panicoideae
- Genus: Sorghum
- Species: S. arundinaceum

Binomial name
- Sorghum arundinaceum (Desv.) Stapf

Synonyms
- List: Andropogon arundinaceus Willd.; Andropogon sorghum subsp. abyssinicus Piper; Andropogon sorghum var. aethiopicus Hack.; Andropogon sorghum subvar. aristatus Hack.; Andropogon sorghum subvar. breviaristatus Hack.; Andropogon sorghum var. effusus Hack.; Andropogon sorghum subvar. longiaristatus Hack.; Andropogon sorghum subvar. submuticus Hack.; Andropogon sorghum subsp. verticilliflorus (Steud.) Piper; Andropogon sorghum subsp. vogelianus Piper; Andropogon stapfii Hook.f.; Andropogon verticilliflorus Steud.; Rhaphis arundinacea Desv.; Sorghum abyssinicum Stapf; Sorghum aethiopicum (Hack.) Rupr. ex Stapf; Sorghum bicolor var. arundinaceum (Desv.) de Wet & Huckabay; Sorghum bicolor subsp. verticilliflorum (Steud.) de Wet ex Wiersema & J.Dahlb.; Sorghum brevicarinatum Snowden; Sorghum castaneum C.E.Hubb. & Snowden; Sorghum lanceolatum Stapf; Sorghum macrochaetum Snowden; Sorghum panicoides Stapf; Sorghum pugionifolium Snowden; Sorghum somaliense Snowden; Sorghum stapfii (Hook.f.) C.E.C.Fisch.; Sorghum usambarense Snowden; Sorghum verticilliflorum (Steud.) Stapf; Sorghum vogelianum (Piper) Stapf

= Sorghum arundinaceum =

Species of plant

Sorghum arundinaceum, the common wild sorghum, is a species of flowering plant in the family Poaceae. It is native to Sub‑Saharan Africa, Madagascar, many of the Indian Ocean islands, and the Indian Subcontinent, and has been introduced to northern South America, the US states of California and Florida, Puerto Rico, Taiwan, New Guinea, and a number of smaller islands worldwide. It is the wild progenitor of cultivated sorghum, Sorghum bicolor, with some authorities considering it to be a mere variety or subspecies; Sorghum bicolor var. arundinaceum, or Sorghum bicolor subsp. verticilliflorum.
