= List of butterflies of Sikkim =

List of butterfly species and subspecies found in Sikkim, in northeast India

This is a tentative list of butterfly species and subspecies found in Sikkim, an Indian state in northeast India.

== Family: Papilionidae ==
=== Subfamily: Papilioninae ===
Tribe: Leptocircini

==== Genus: Graphium (swordtails, bluebottles and jays) ====
===== Species: Graphium cloanthus (glassy bluebottle) =====
Subspecies: Graphium cloanthus cloanthus (Himalayan glassy bluebottle)

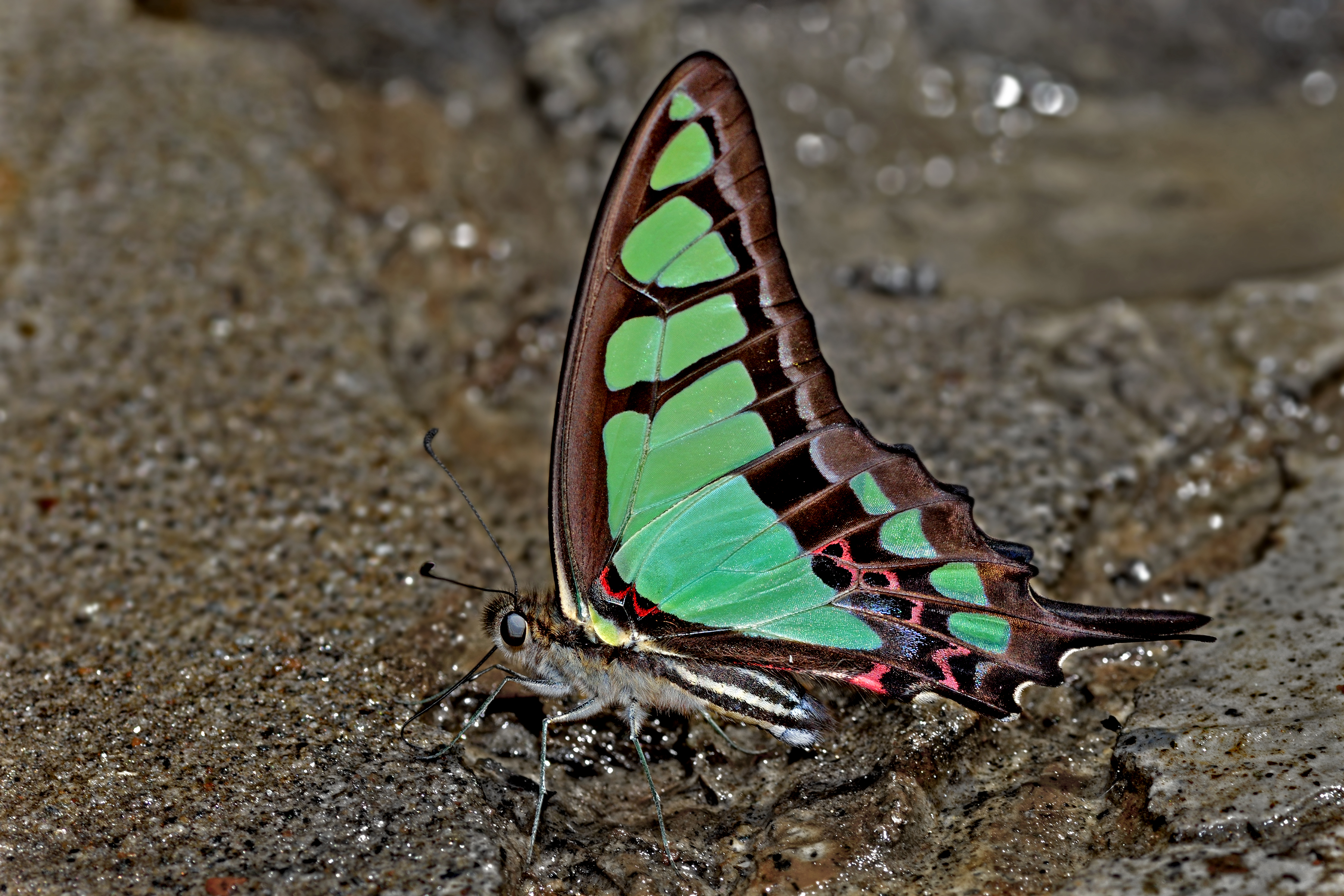
Ventral view

Tribe: Papilionini

===== Species: Papilio bianor (common peacock) =====
Subspecies: Papilio bianor ganesa (east Himalayan common peacock)

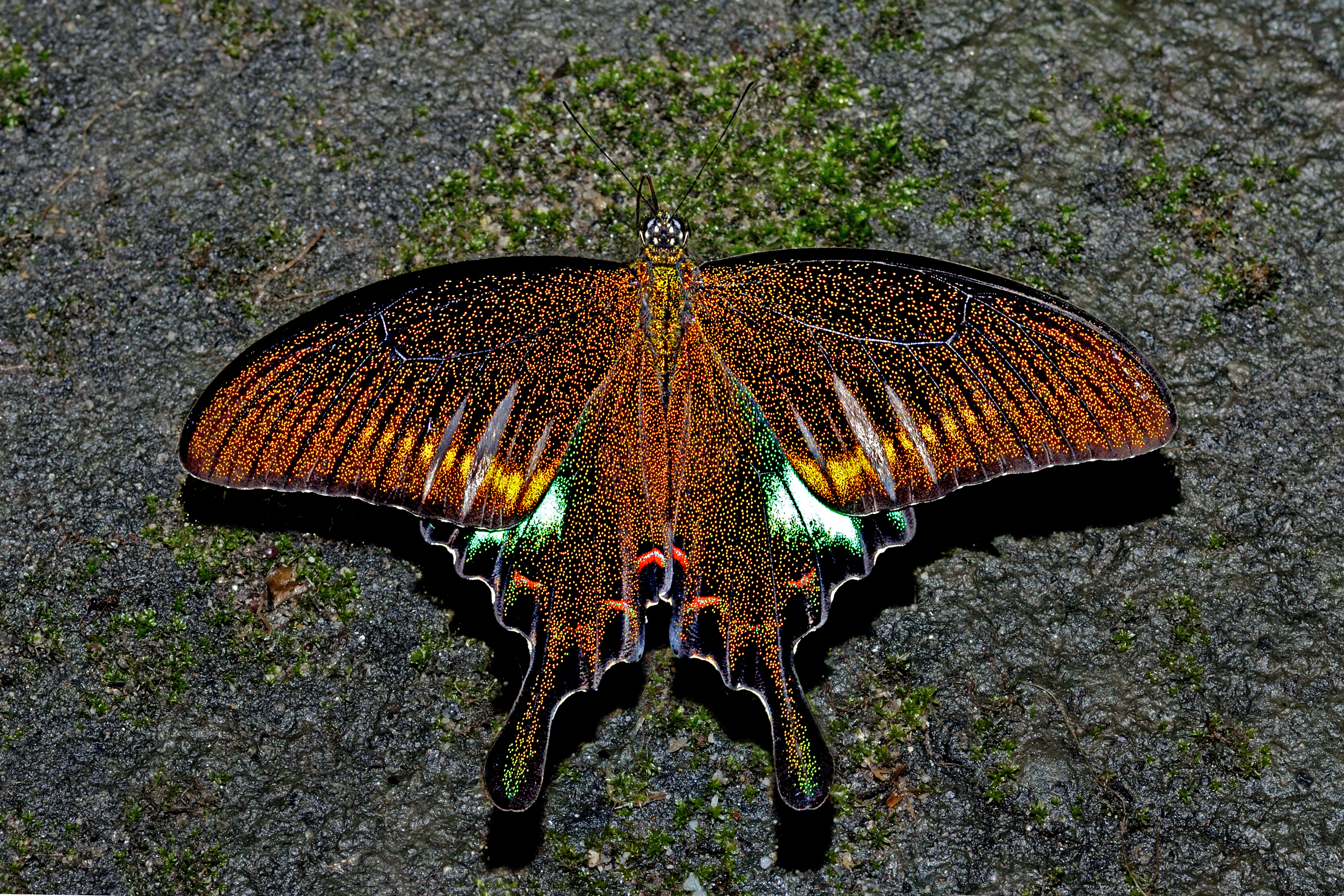
Dorsal view

===== Species: Papilio helenus (red Helen) =====
Subspecies: Papilio helenus helenus (Oriental red Helen)

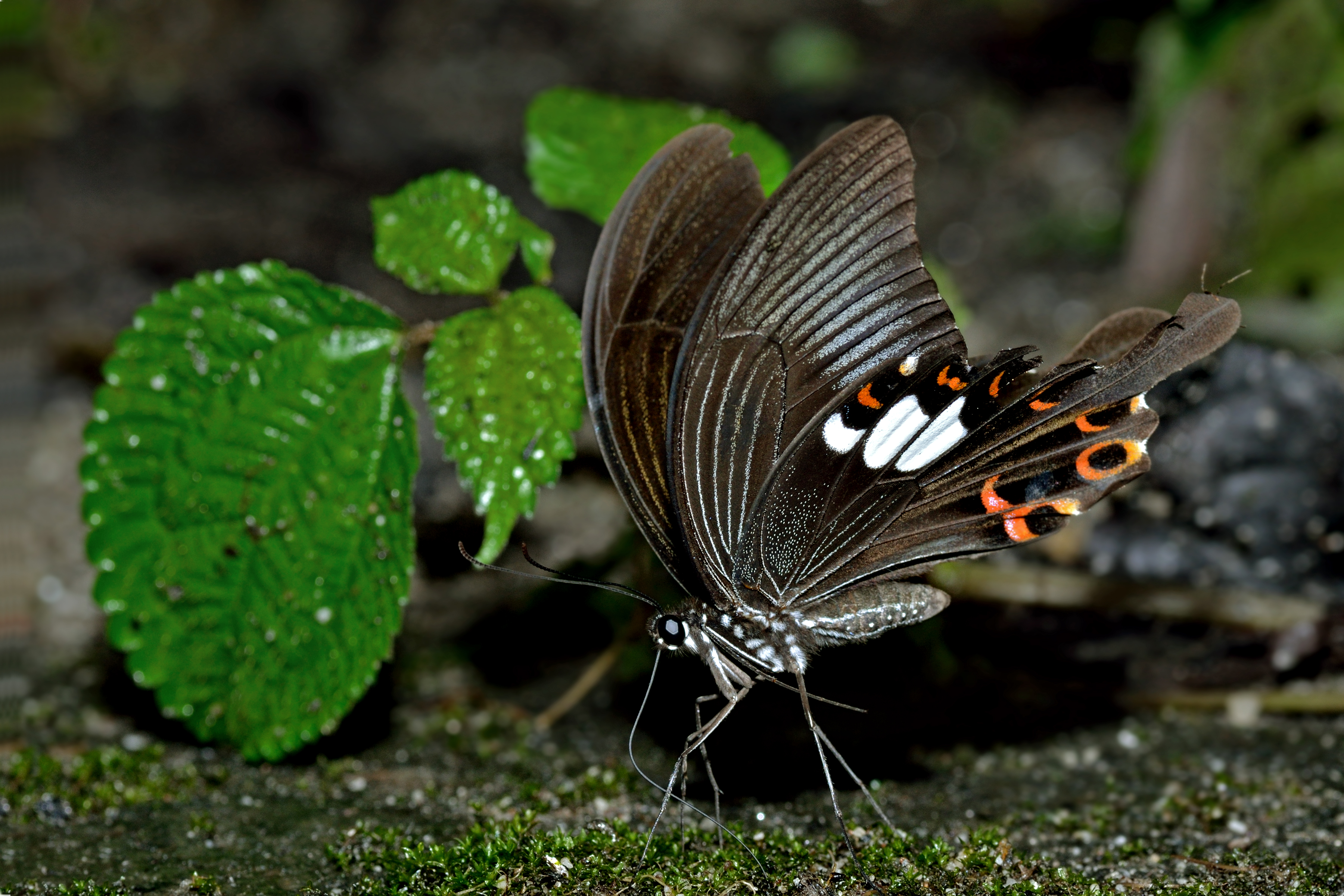
Ventral view

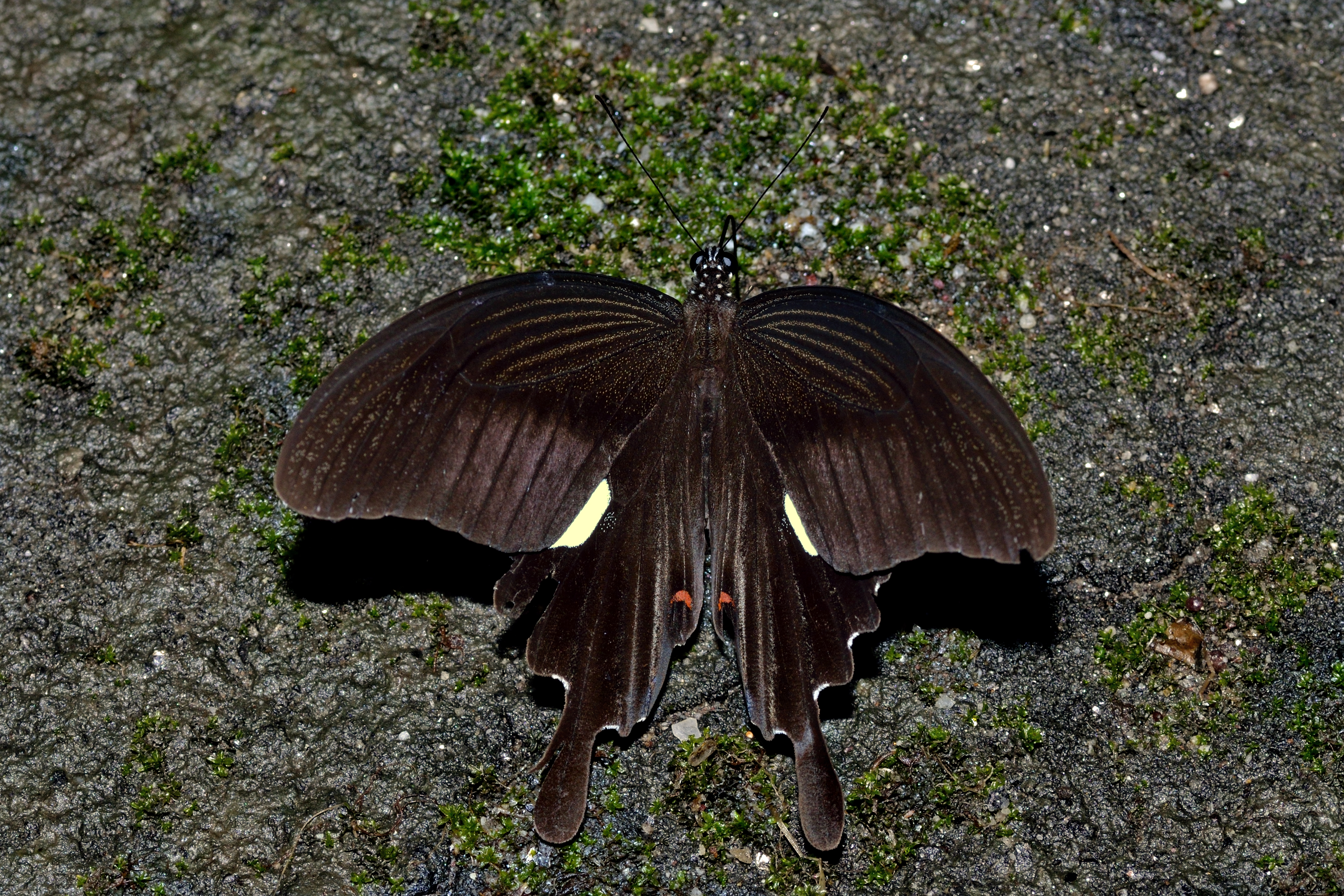
Dorsal view

===== Species: Papilio nephelus (yellow Helen) =====
Subspecies: Papilio nephelus chaon (Khasi yellow Helen)

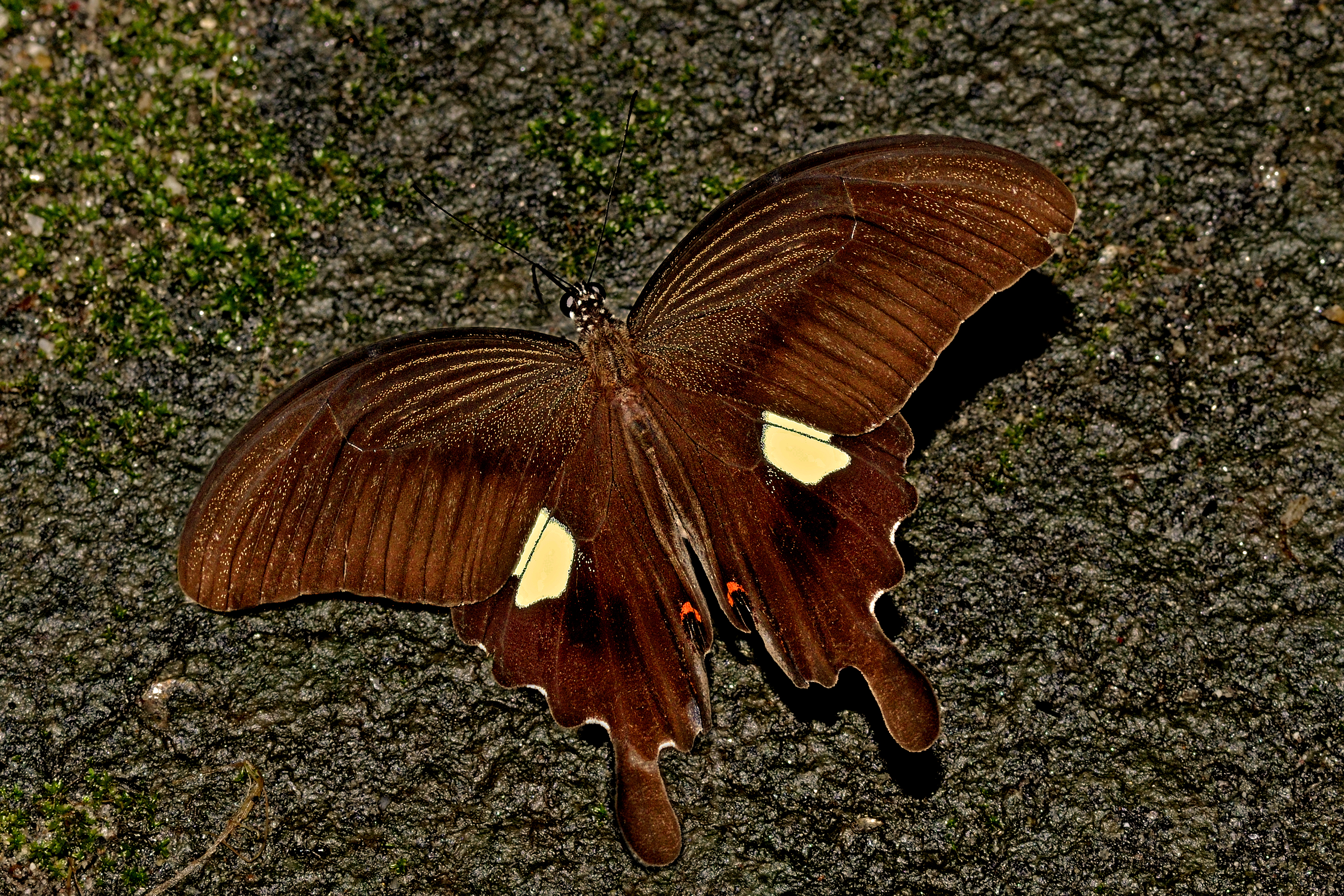
Dorsal view

== Family: Pieridae ==
=== Subfamily: Pierinae ===
Tribe: Pierini

==== Genus: Delias (Jezebels) ====
===== Species: Delias agostina (yellow Jezebel) =====
Subspecies: Delias agostina agostina (Sikkim yellow Jezebel)

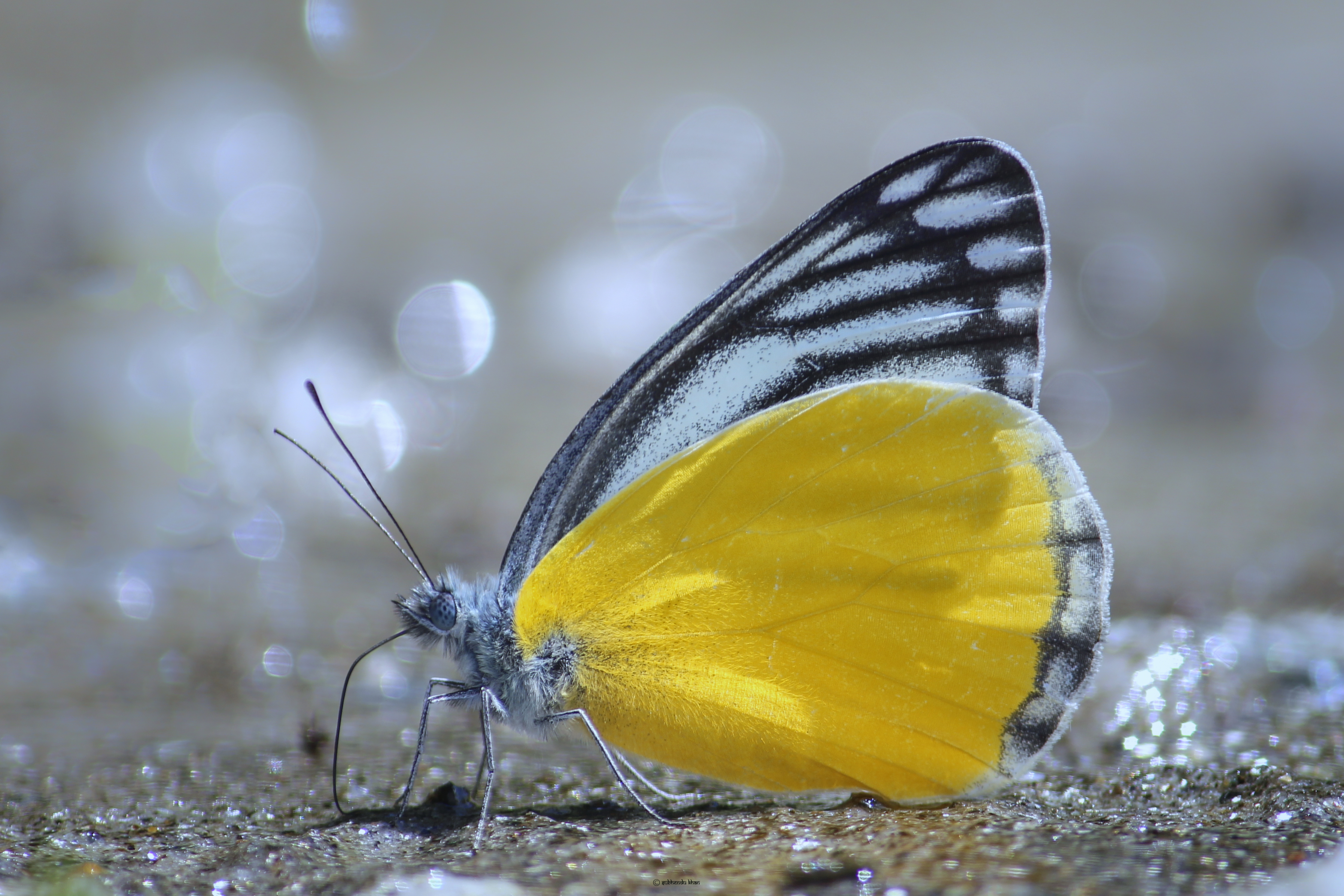
Ventral view

==== Genus: Pieris ====
===== Species: Pieris canidia (Asian cabbage white) =====
Subspecies: Pieris canidia indica (Indian cabbage white)

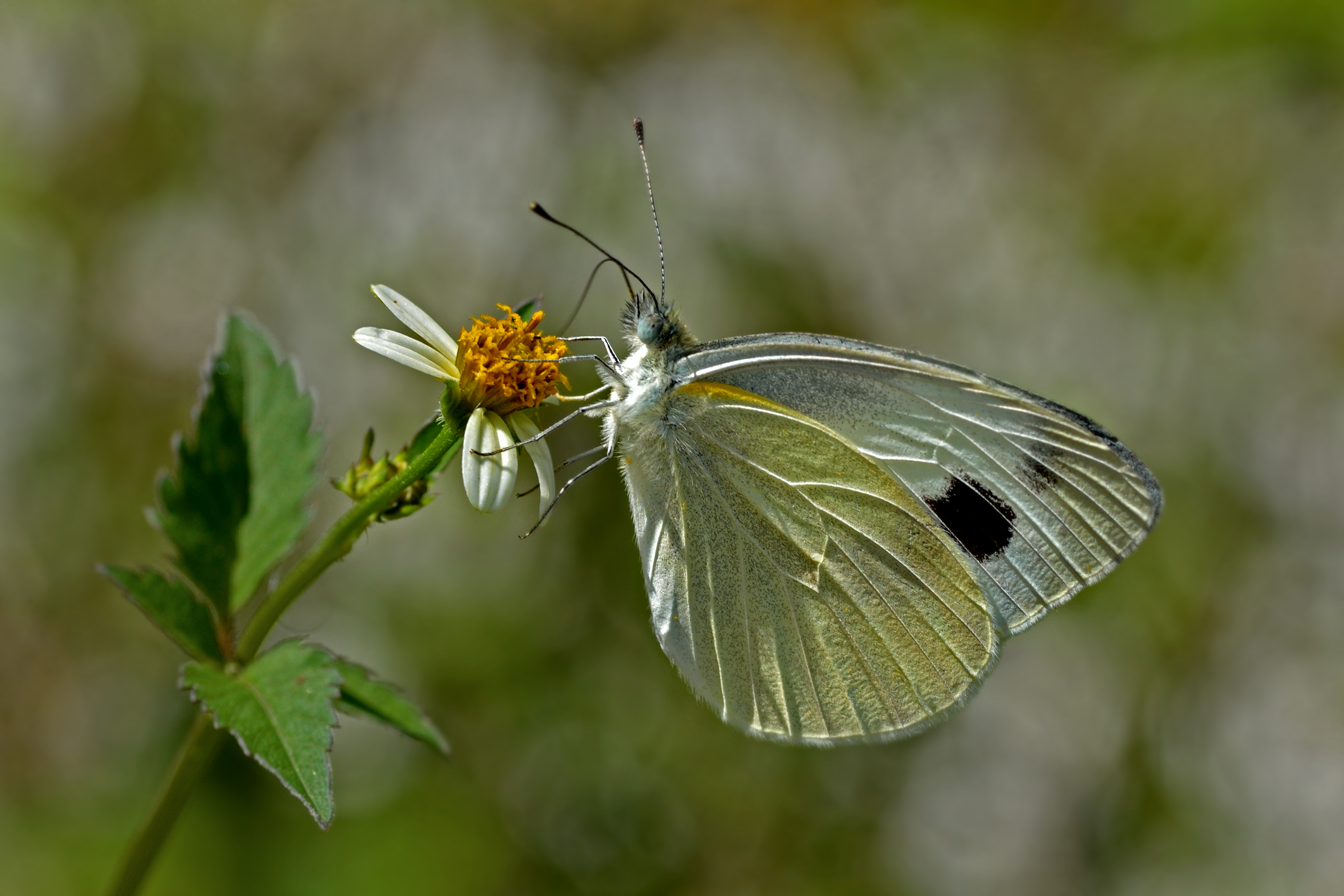
Ventral view

== Family: Lycaenidae ==
=== Subfamily: Miletinae ===
Tribe: Miletini

==== Genus: Allotinus ====
===== Species: Allotinus drumila (crenulate mottle) =====
Subspecies: Allotinus drumila drumila (Himalayan Crenulate Mottle)

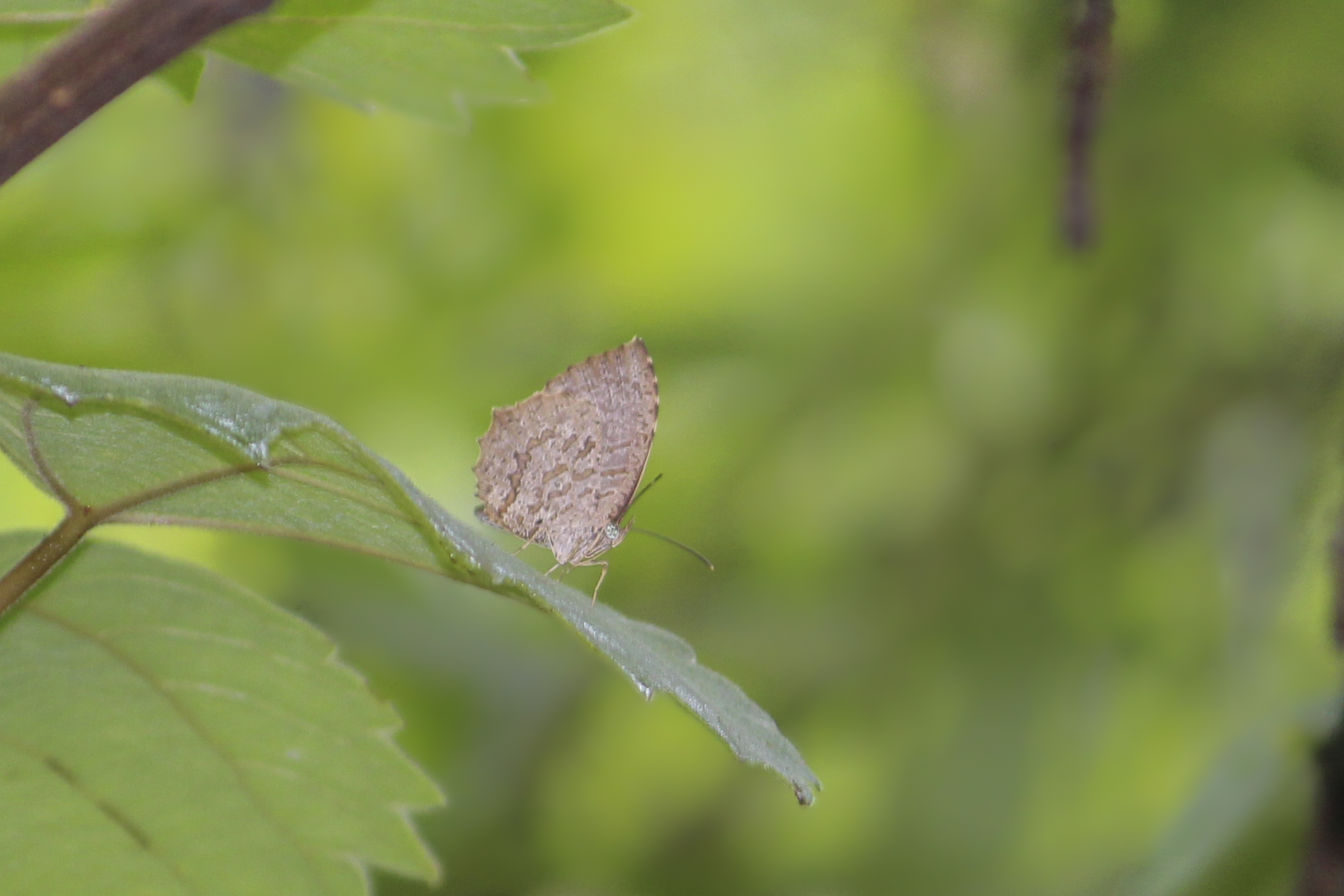
Ventral view

=== Subfamily: Polyommatinae ===
Tribe: Polyommatini

==== Genus: Acytolepis ====
===== Species: Acytolepis puspa (common hedge blue) =====
Subspecies: Acytolepis puspa gisca (Himalayan common hedge blue)

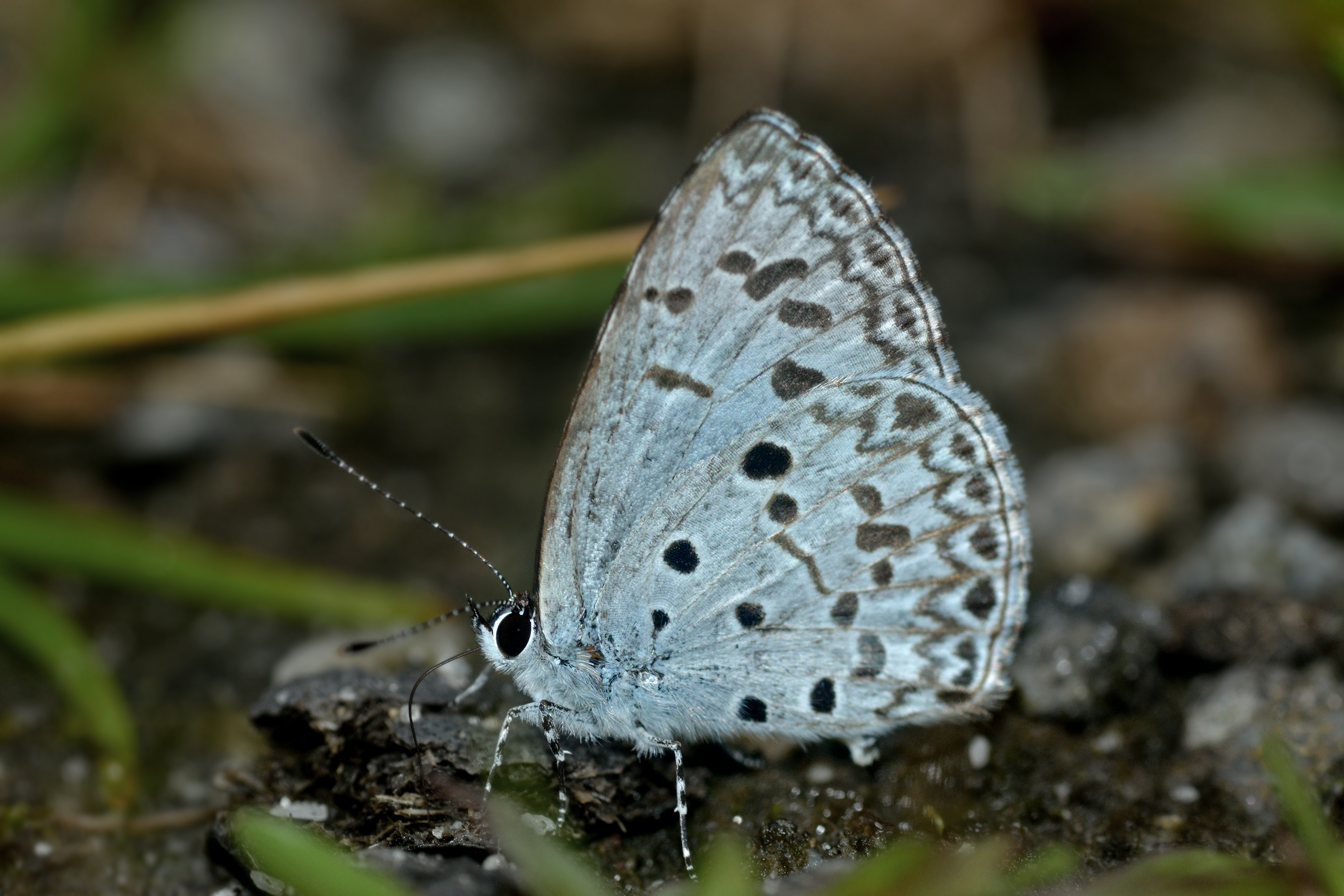
Ventral view

==== Genus: Jamides ====
===== Species: Jamides alecto (metallic cerulean) =====
Subspecies: Jamides alecto eurysaces (Himalayan metallic cerulean)

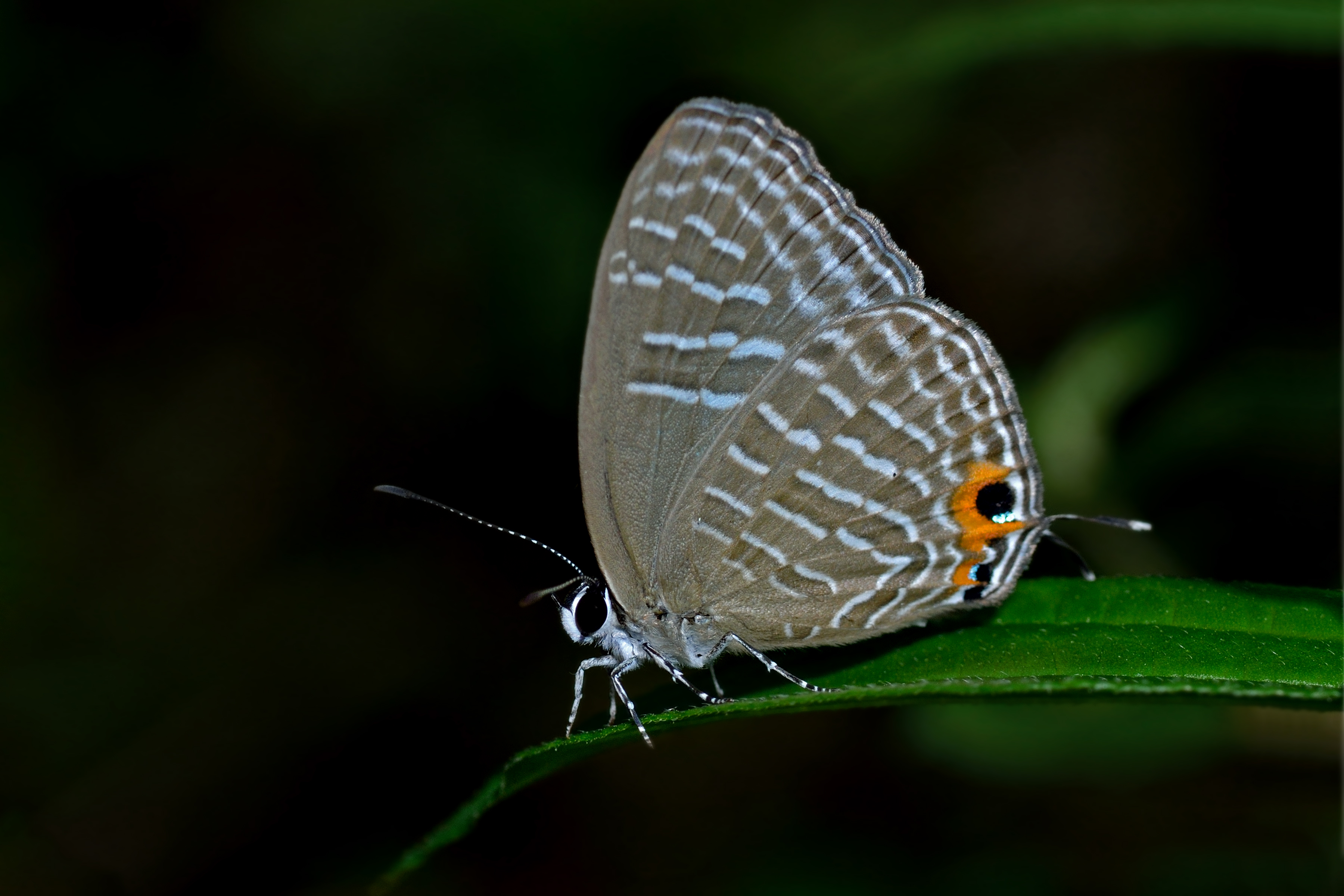
Ventral view

=== Subfamily: Theclinae ===
Tribe: Hypolycaenini

==== Genus: Hypolycaena ====
===== Species: Hypolycaena kina (blue tit) =====
Subspecies: Hypolycaena kina kina (Darjeeling blue tit)

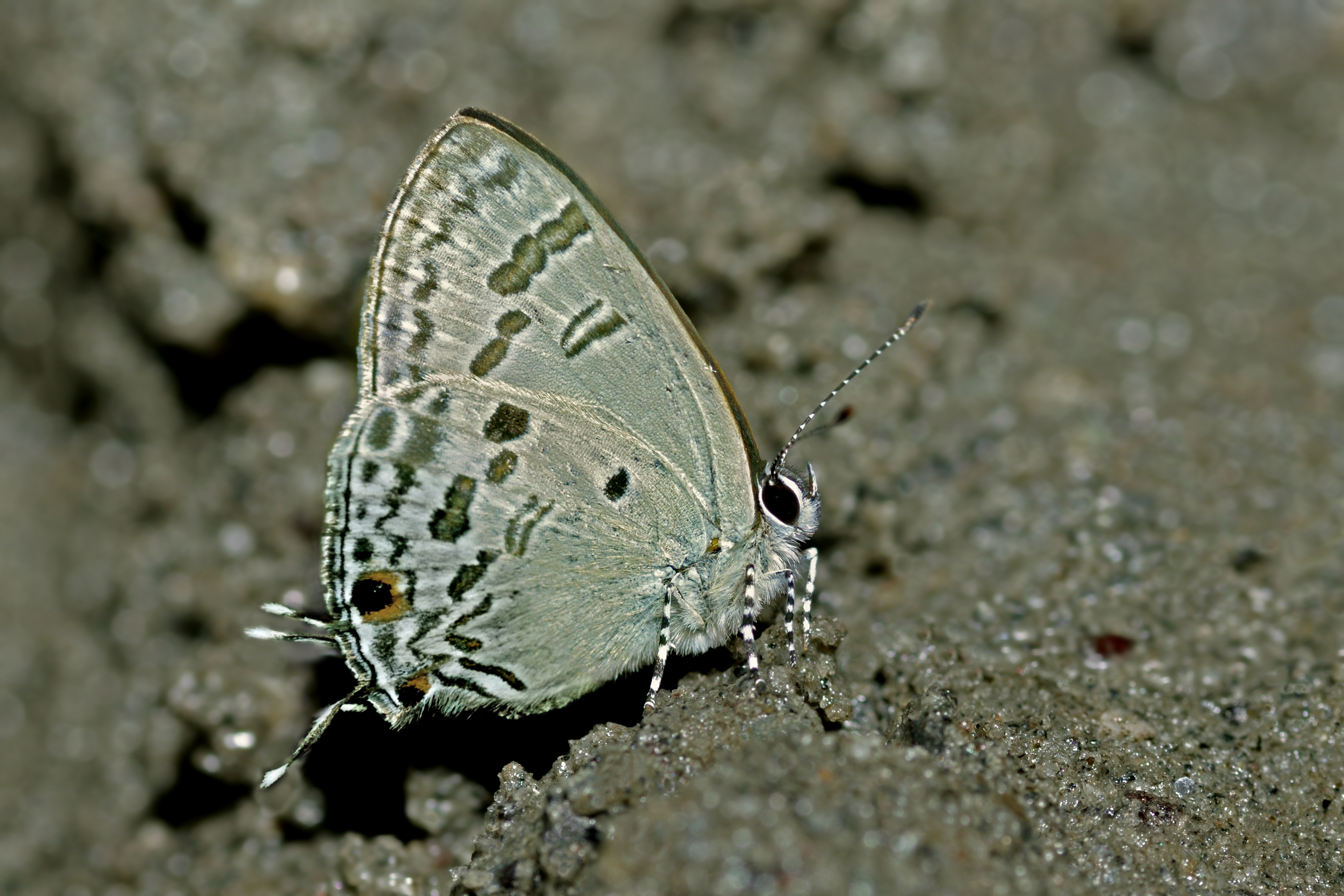
Ventral view

== Family: Nymphalidae ==
=== Subfamily: Cyrestinae ===
==== Genus: Chersonesia ====
===== Species: Chersonesia risa (common maplet) =====
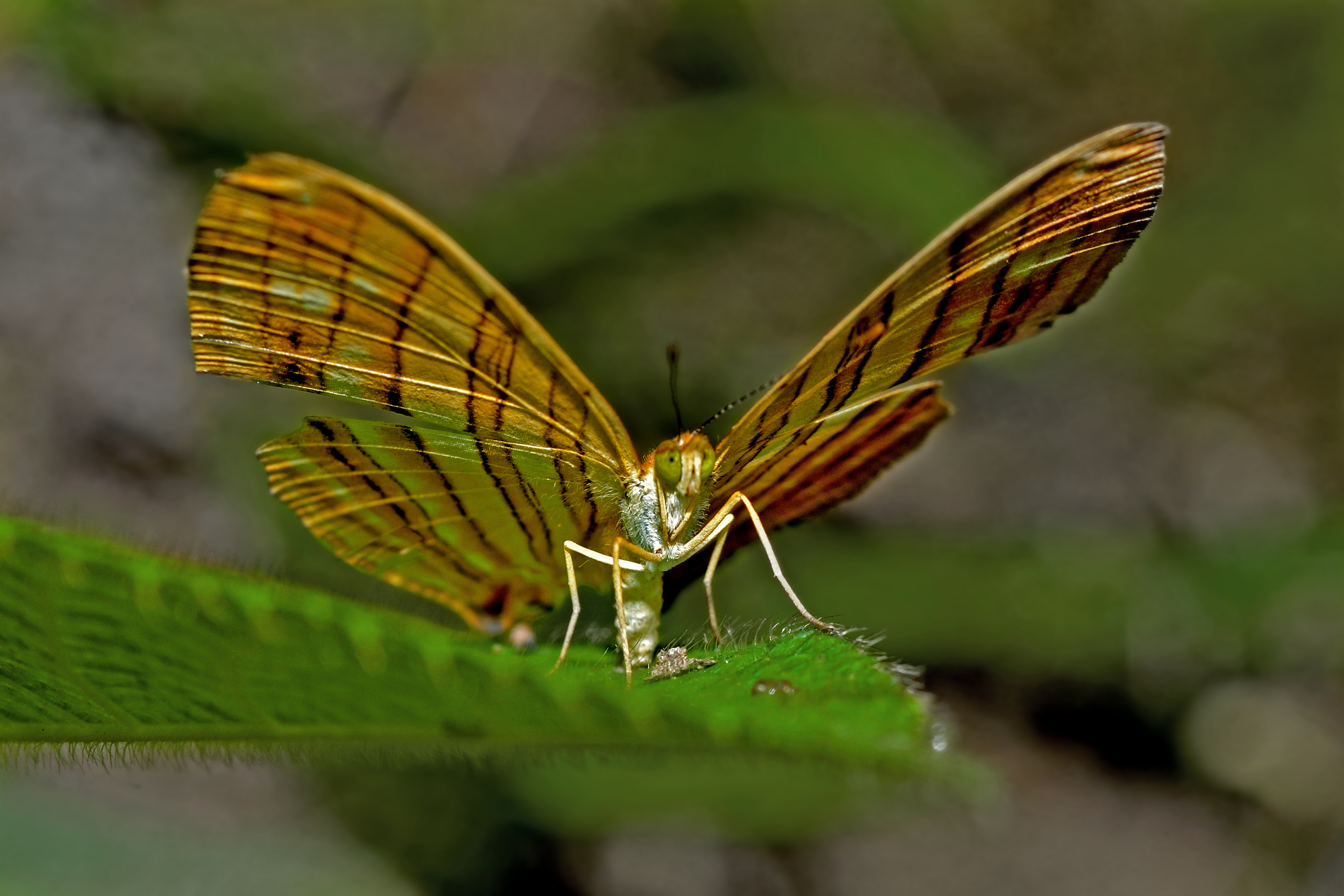
Ventral view

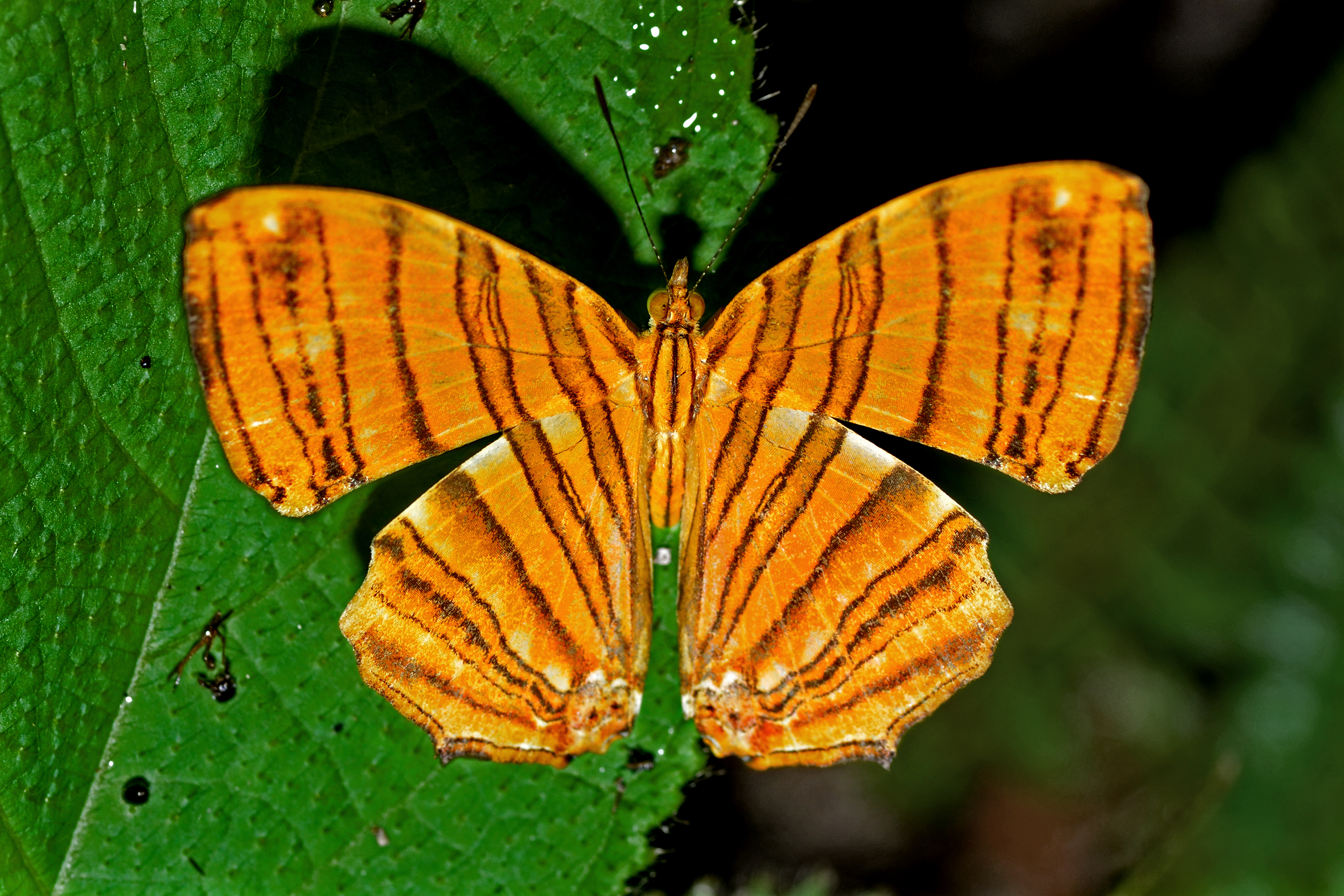
Dorsal view

=== Subfamily: Heliconiinae ===
Tribe: Acraeini

==== Genus: Acraea ====
===== Species: Acraea issoria (yellow coster) =====
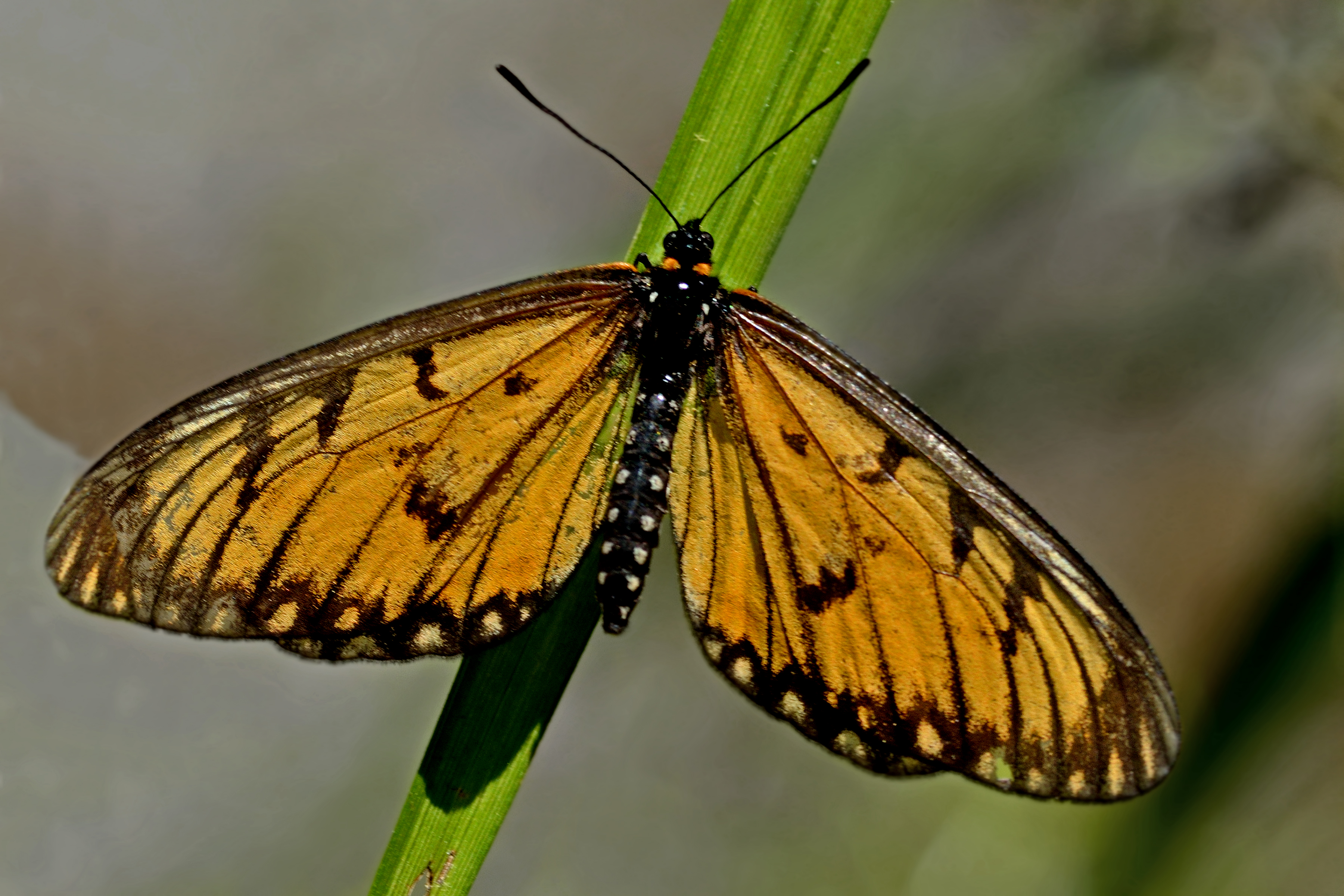
Dorsal view (female)

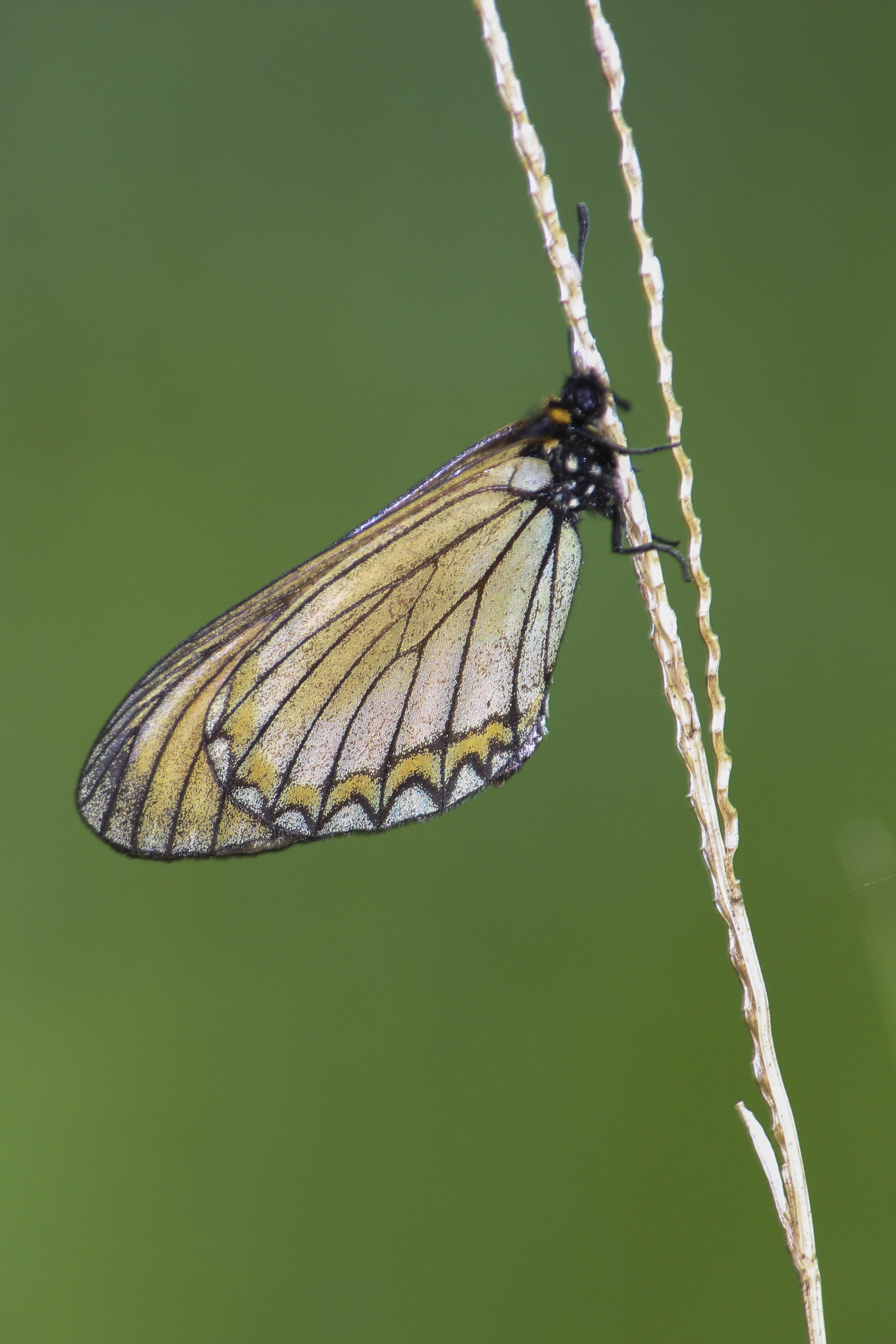
Ventral view

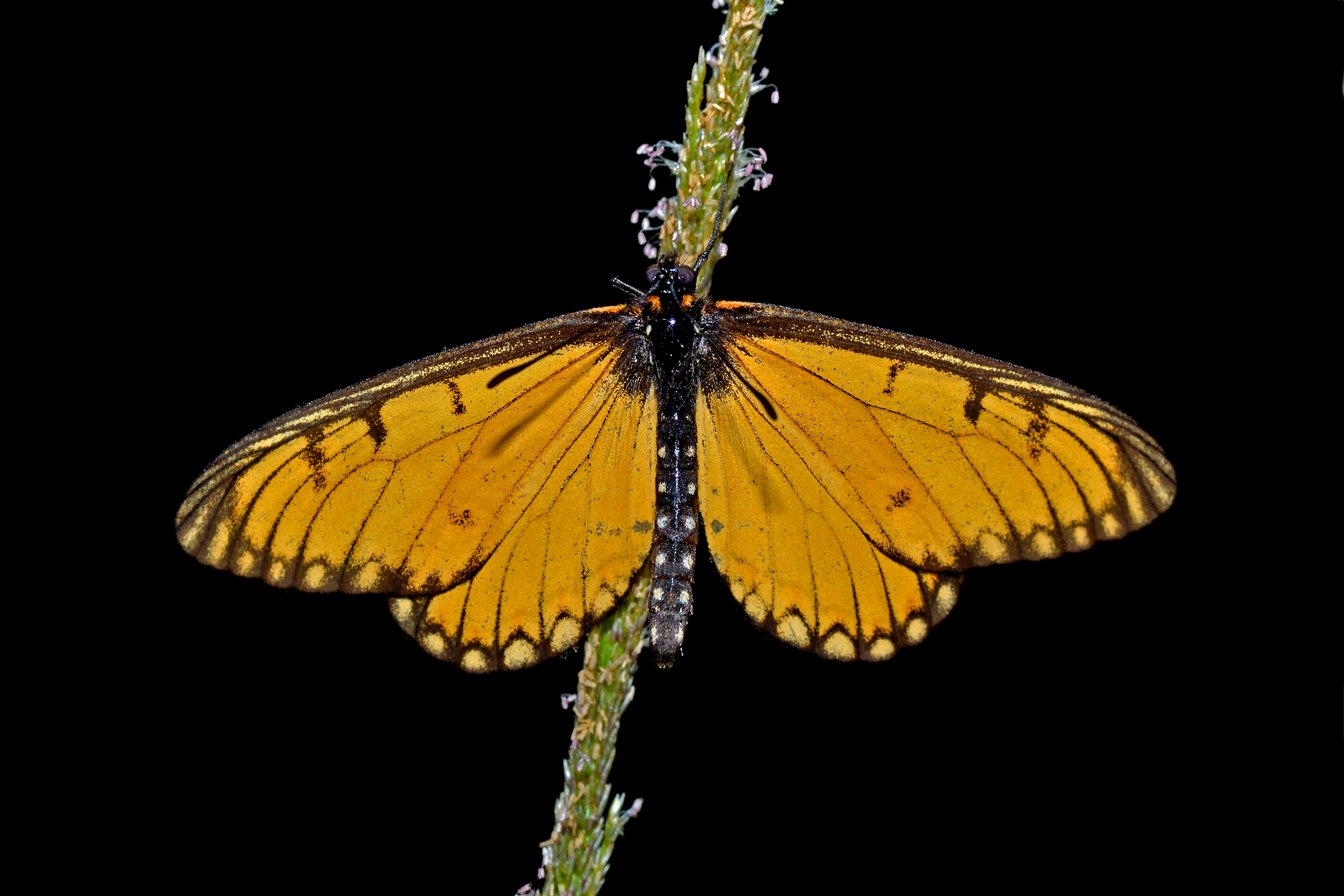
Dorsal view (male)

=== Subfamily: Libytheinae ===
==== Genus: Libythea ====
===== Species: Libythea myrrha (club beak) =====
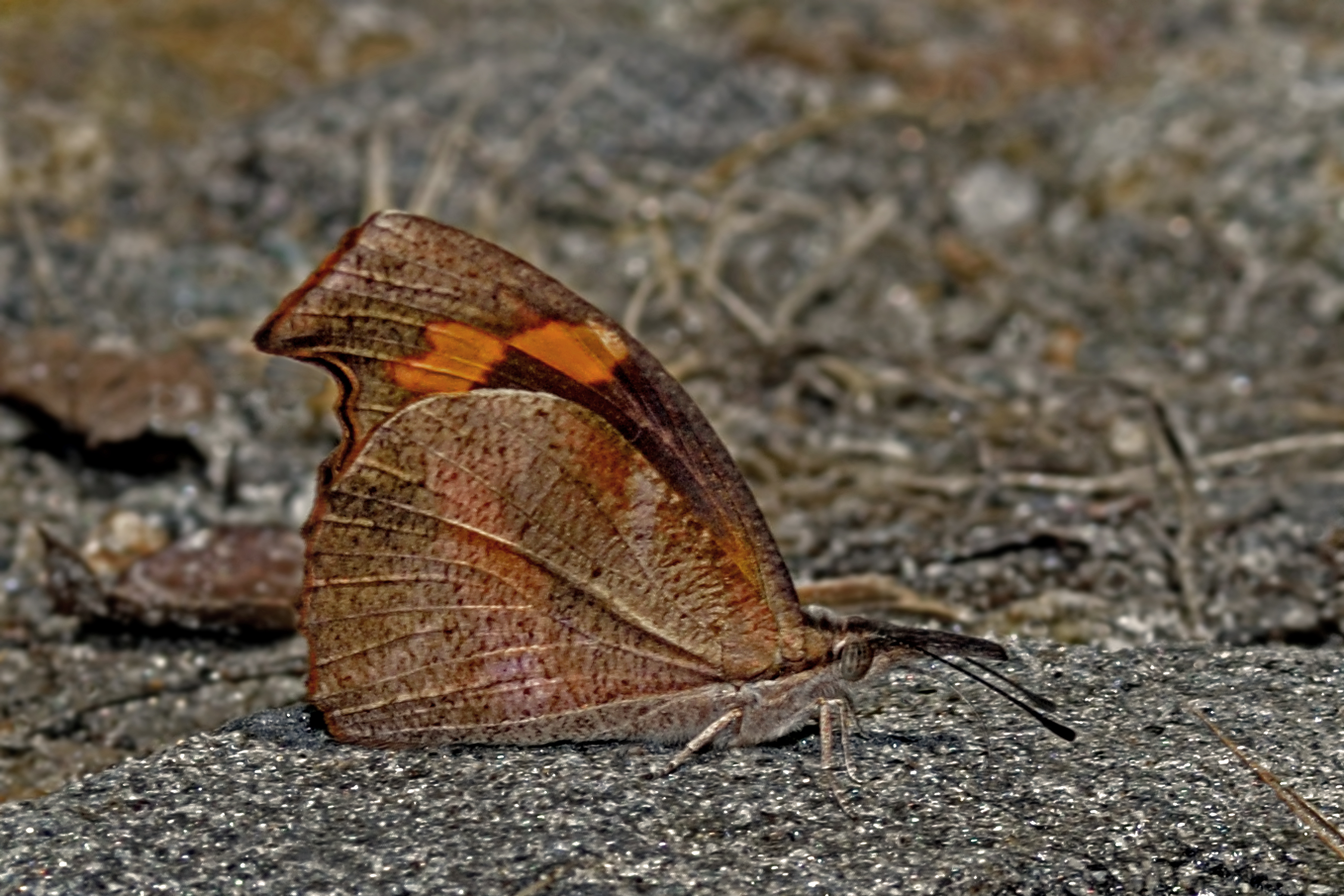
Ventral view

=== Subfamily: Limenitidinae ===
Tribe: Adoliadini

==== Genus: bassarona ====
===== Species: Bassarona durga (blue duke) =====
Subspecies: bassarona durga durga (Himalayan blue duke)

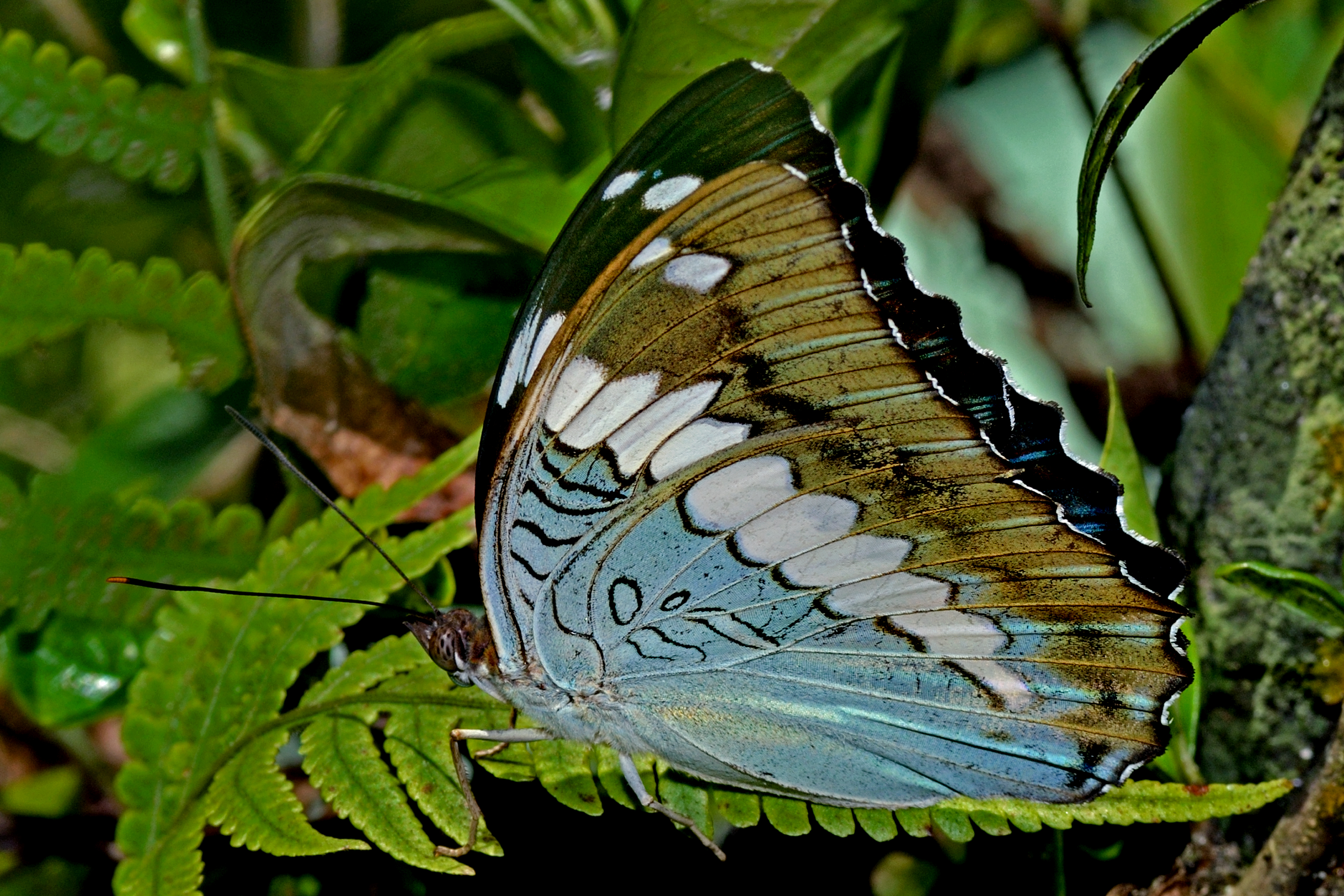
Ventral view

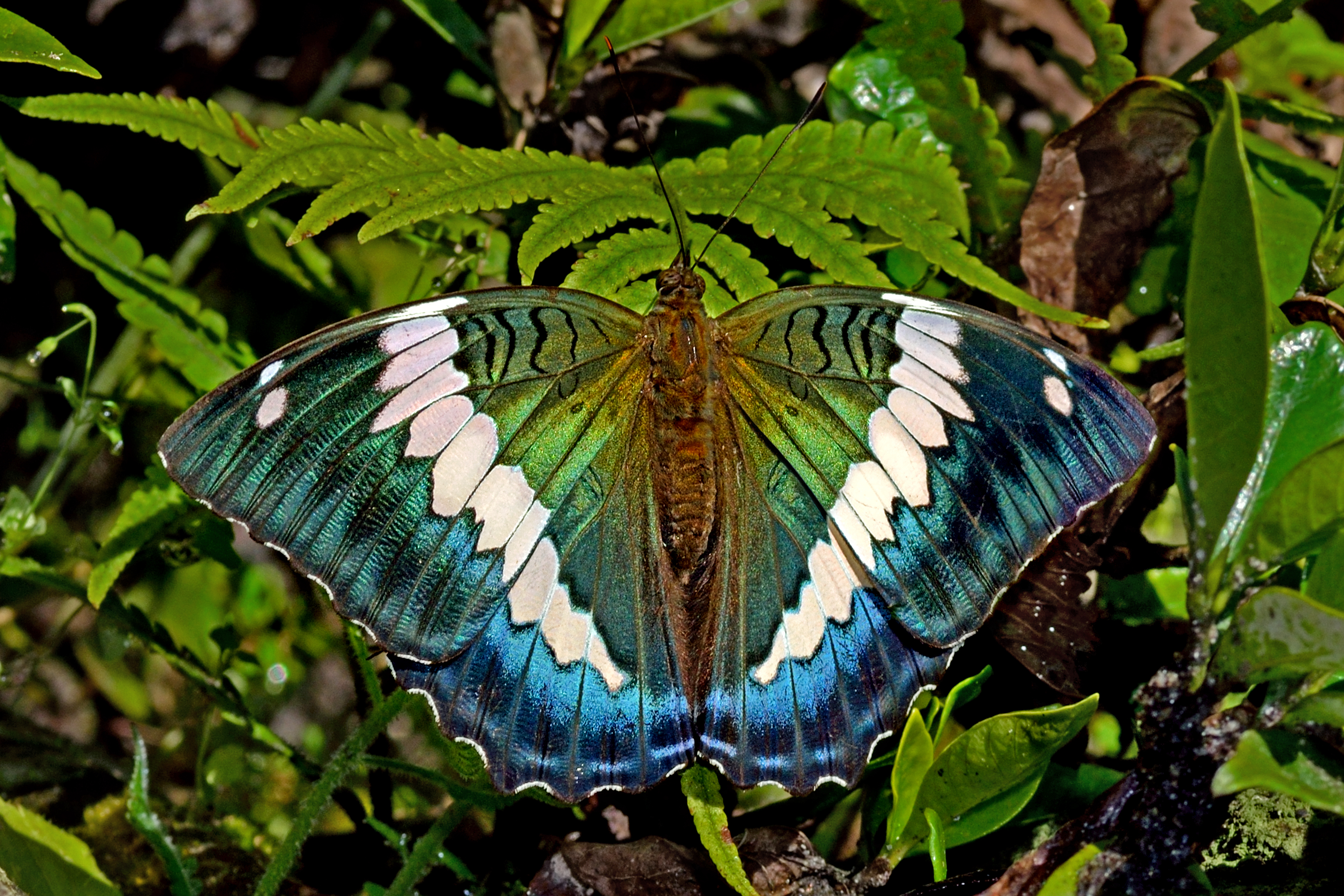
Dorsal view

===== Species: Tanaecia julii (common earl) =====
Subspecies: Tanaecia julii appiades (changeable common earl)

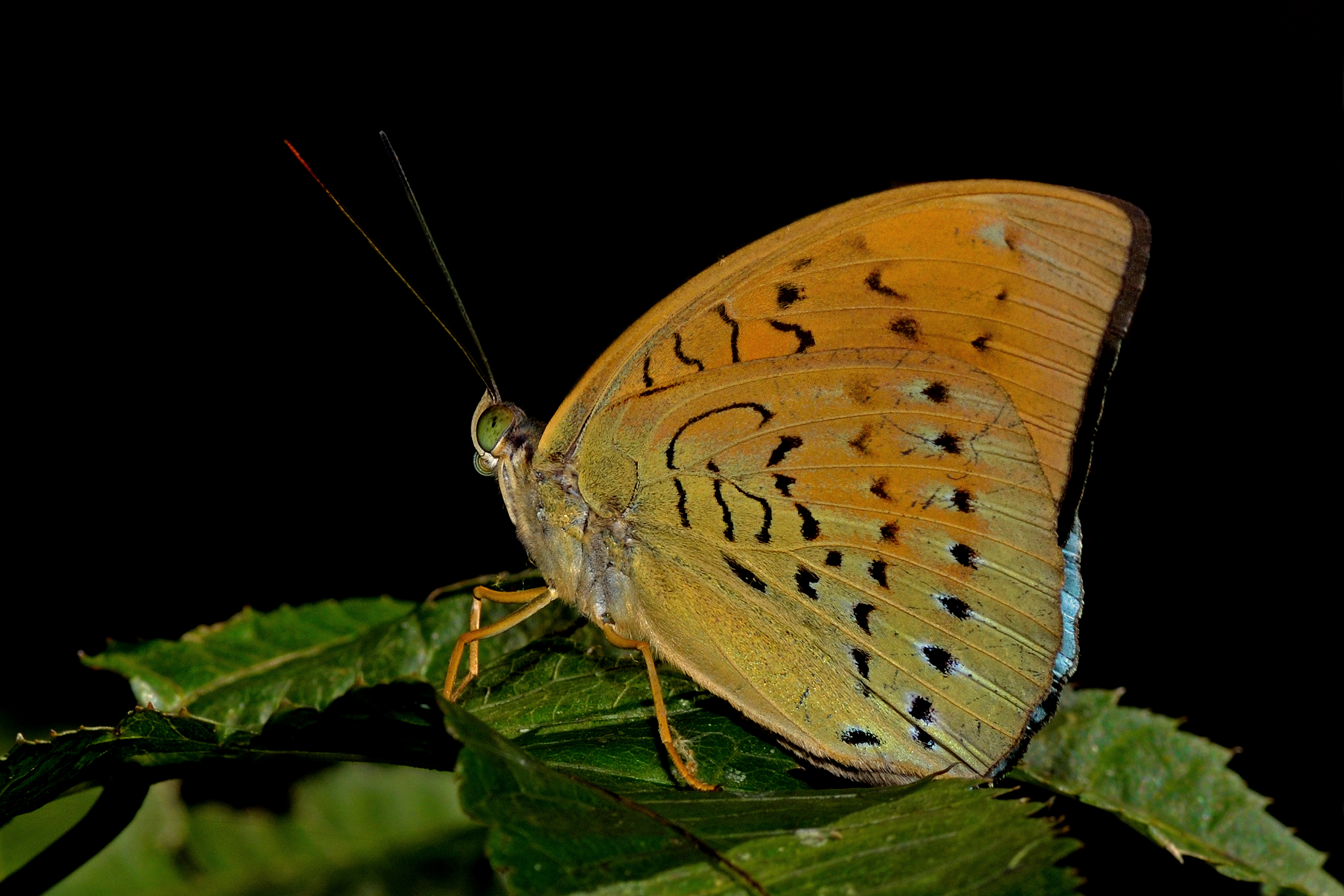
Ventral view

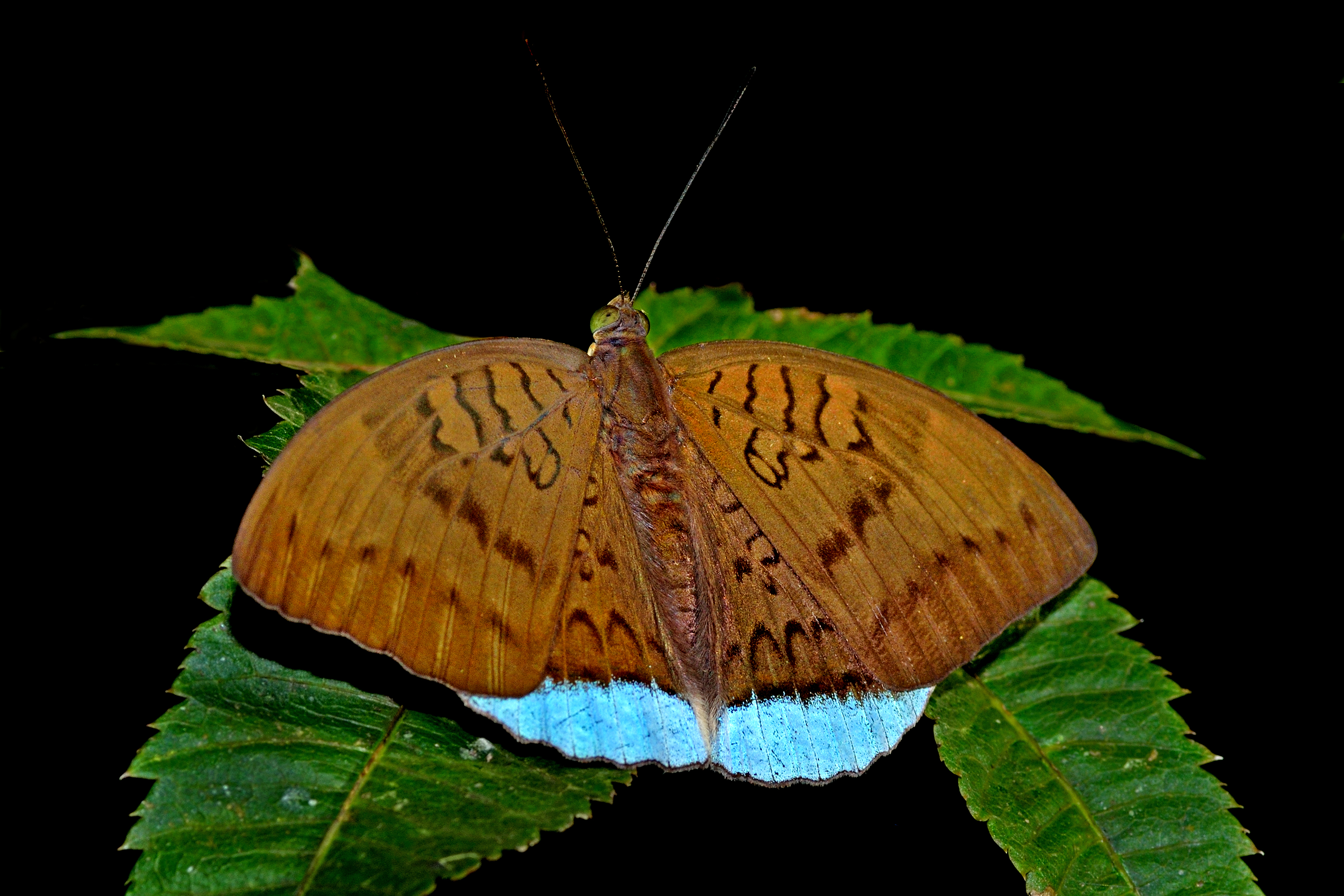
Dorsal view

Tribe: Limenitidini

==== Genus: Athyma ====
===== Species: Athyma jina (Bhutan sergeant) =====
Subspecies: Athyma jina jina (sullied Bhutan sergeant)

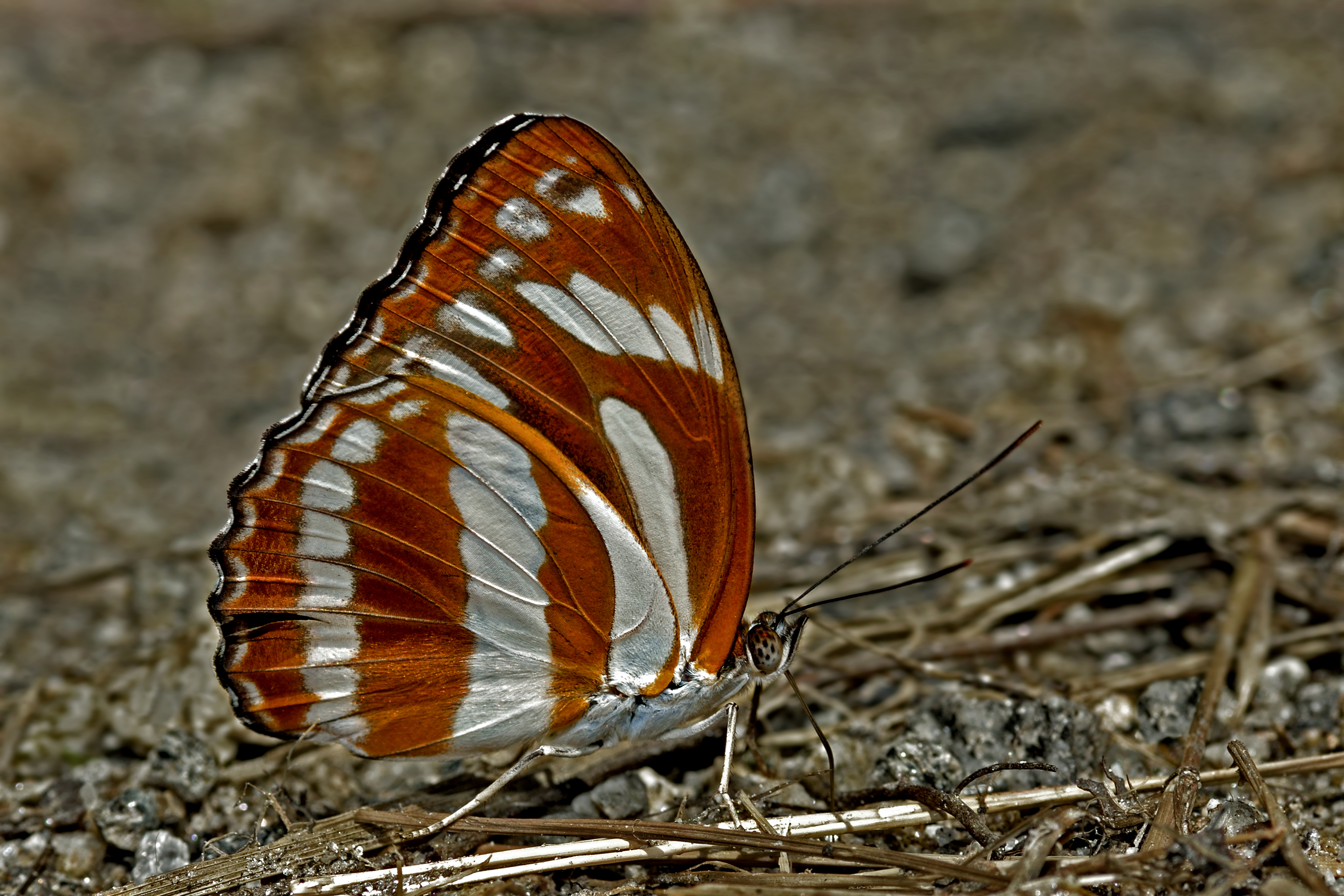
Ventral view

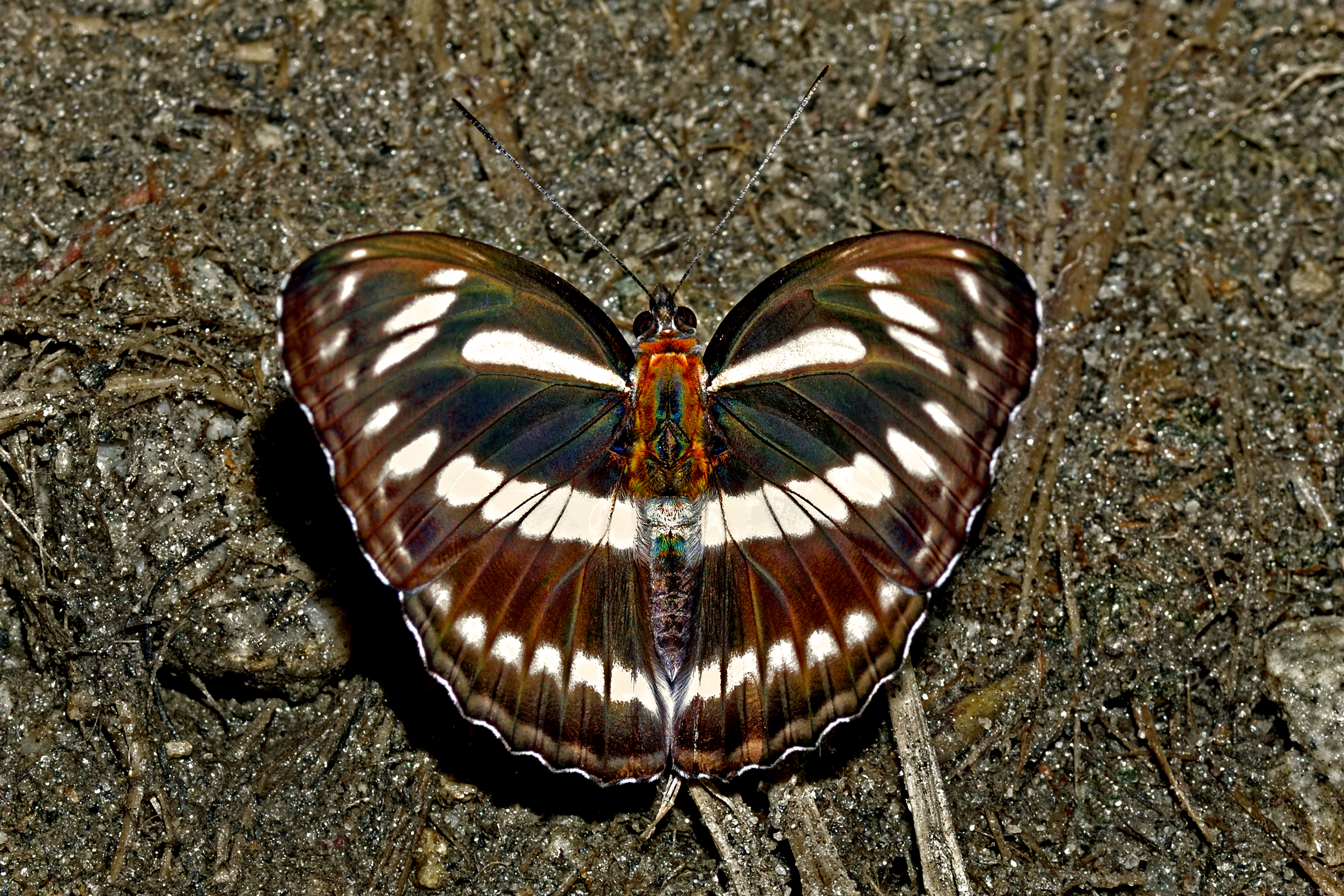
Dorsal view

=== Subfamily: Nymphalinae ===
Tribe: Junoniini

==== Genus: Junonia ====
===== Species: Junonia iphita (chocolate pansy) =====
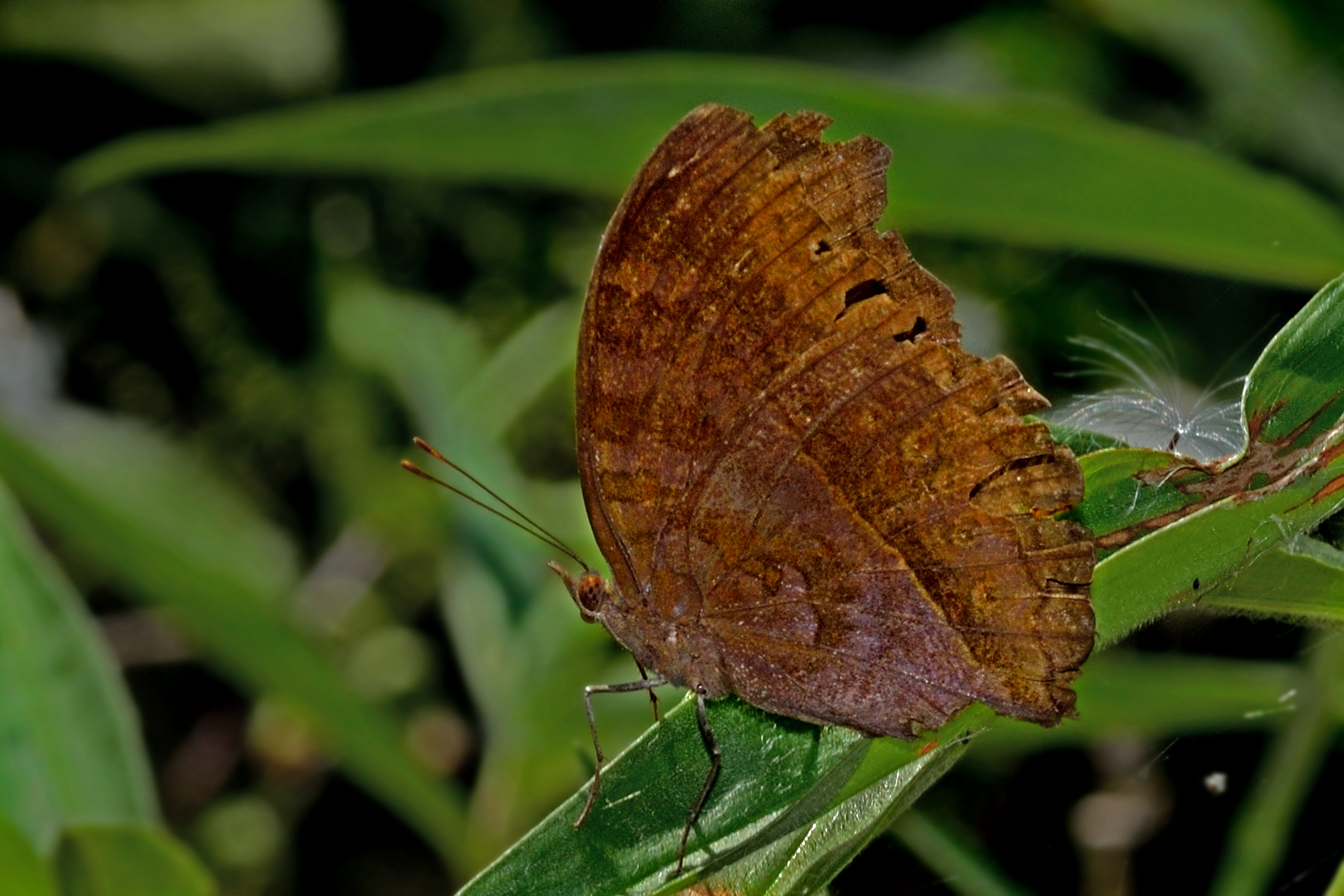
Ventral view

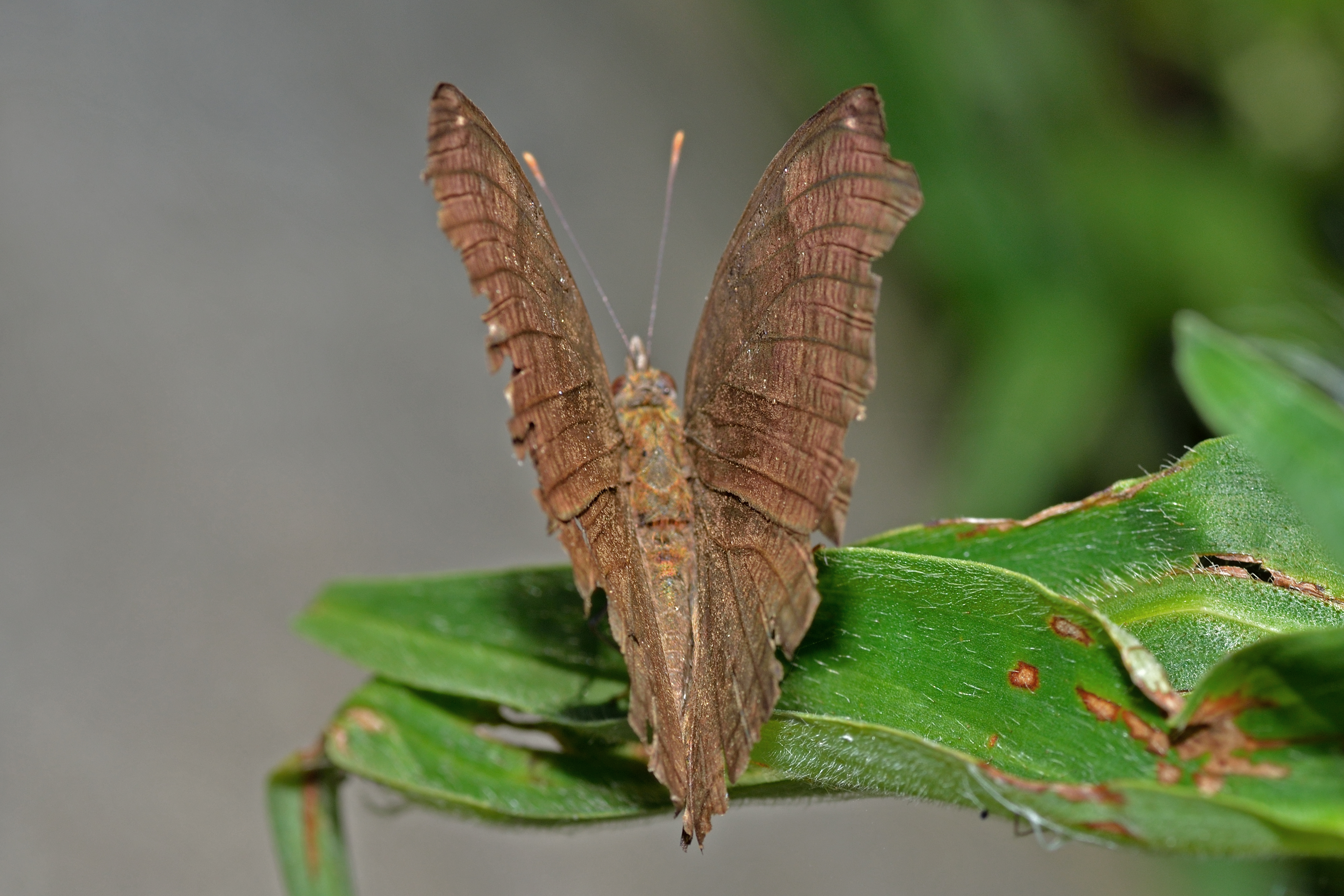
Dorsal view

Tribe: Nymphalini

==== Genus: Aglais ====
===== Species: Aglais caschmirensis (Indian tortoiseshell) =====
Subspecies: Aglais caschmirensis aesis (Himalayan tortoiseshell)

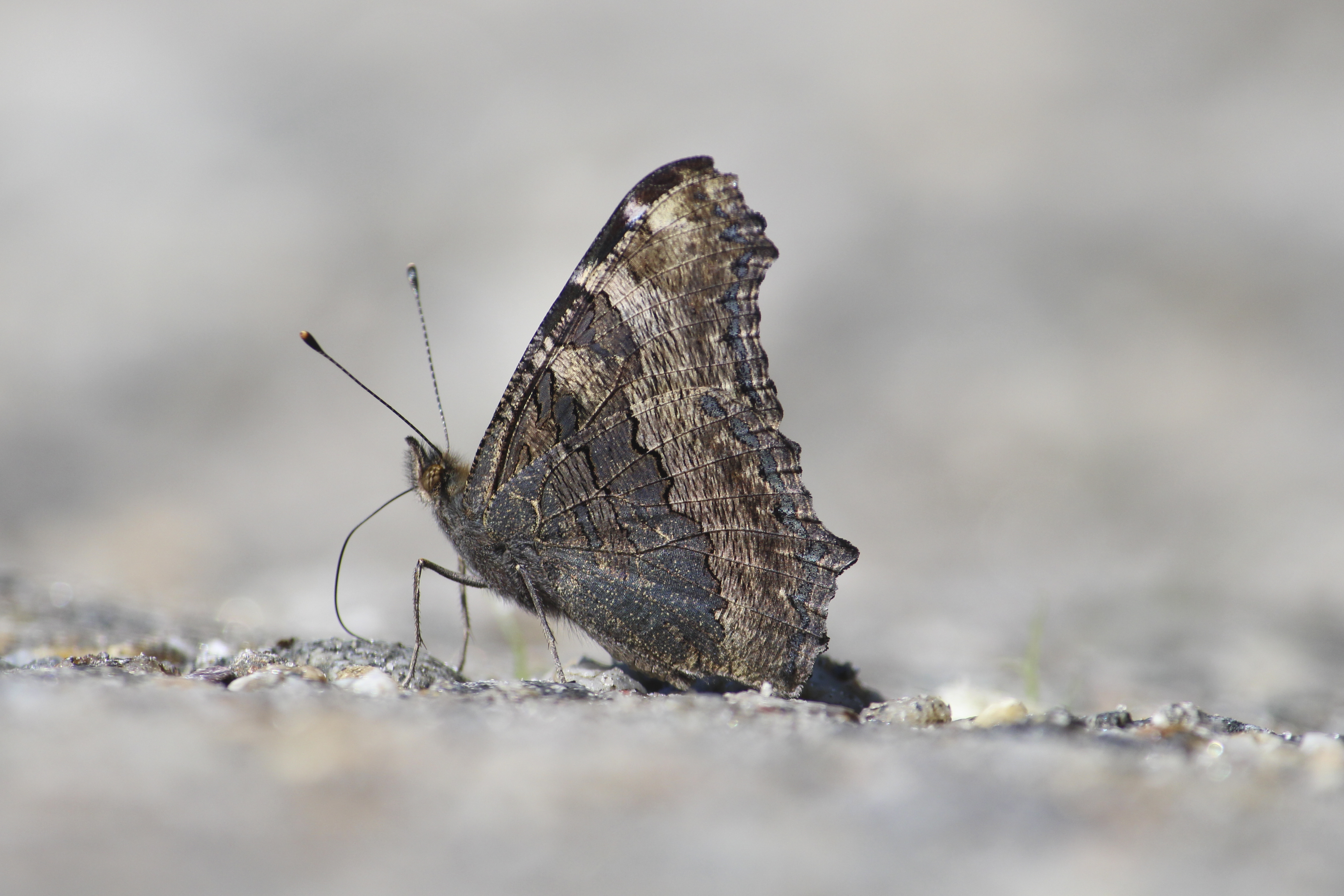
Ventral view

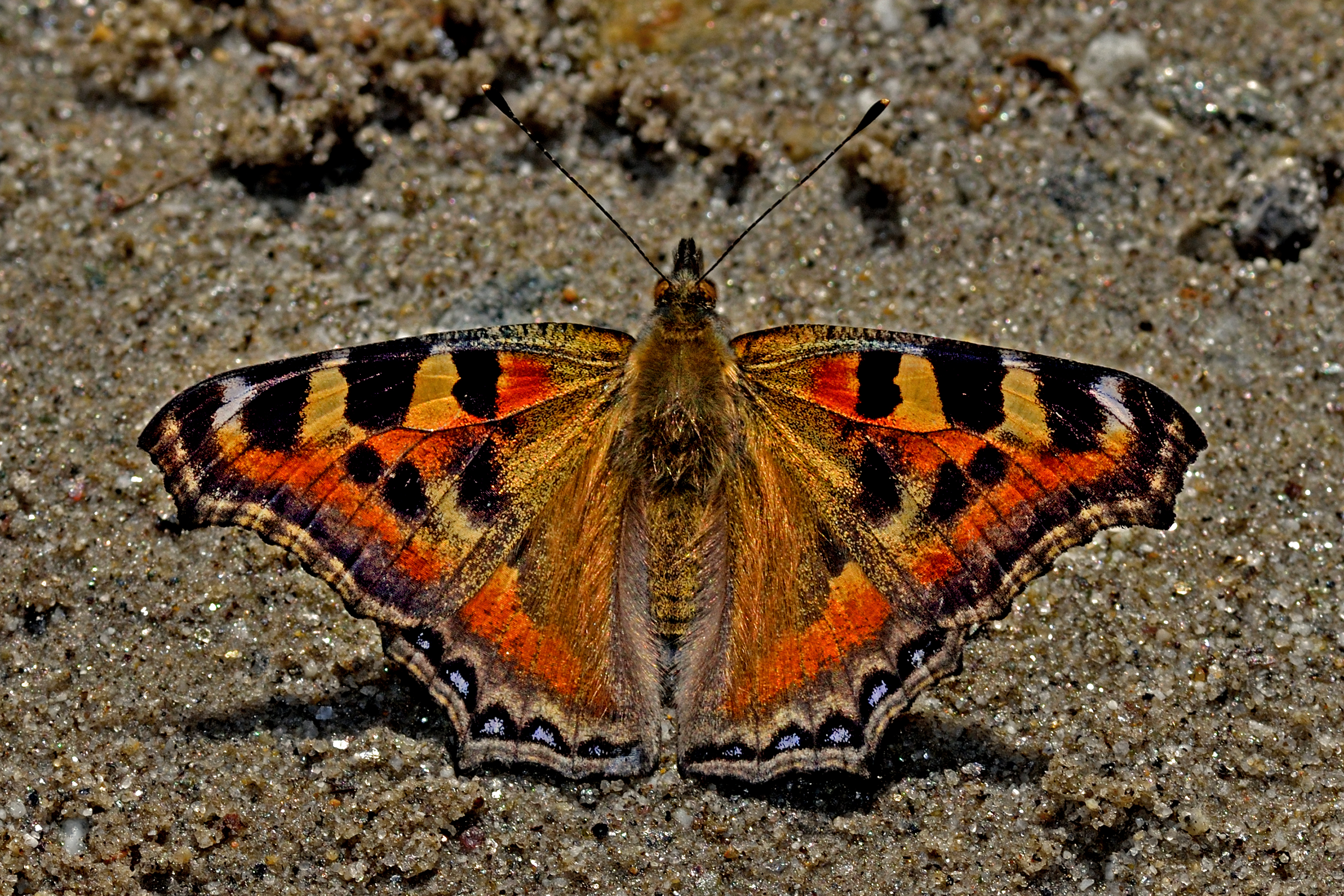
Dorsal view

=== Subfamily: Pseudergolinae ===
Tribe: Pseudergolini

==== Genus: Pseudergolis ====
===== Species: Pseudergolis wedah (tabby) =====
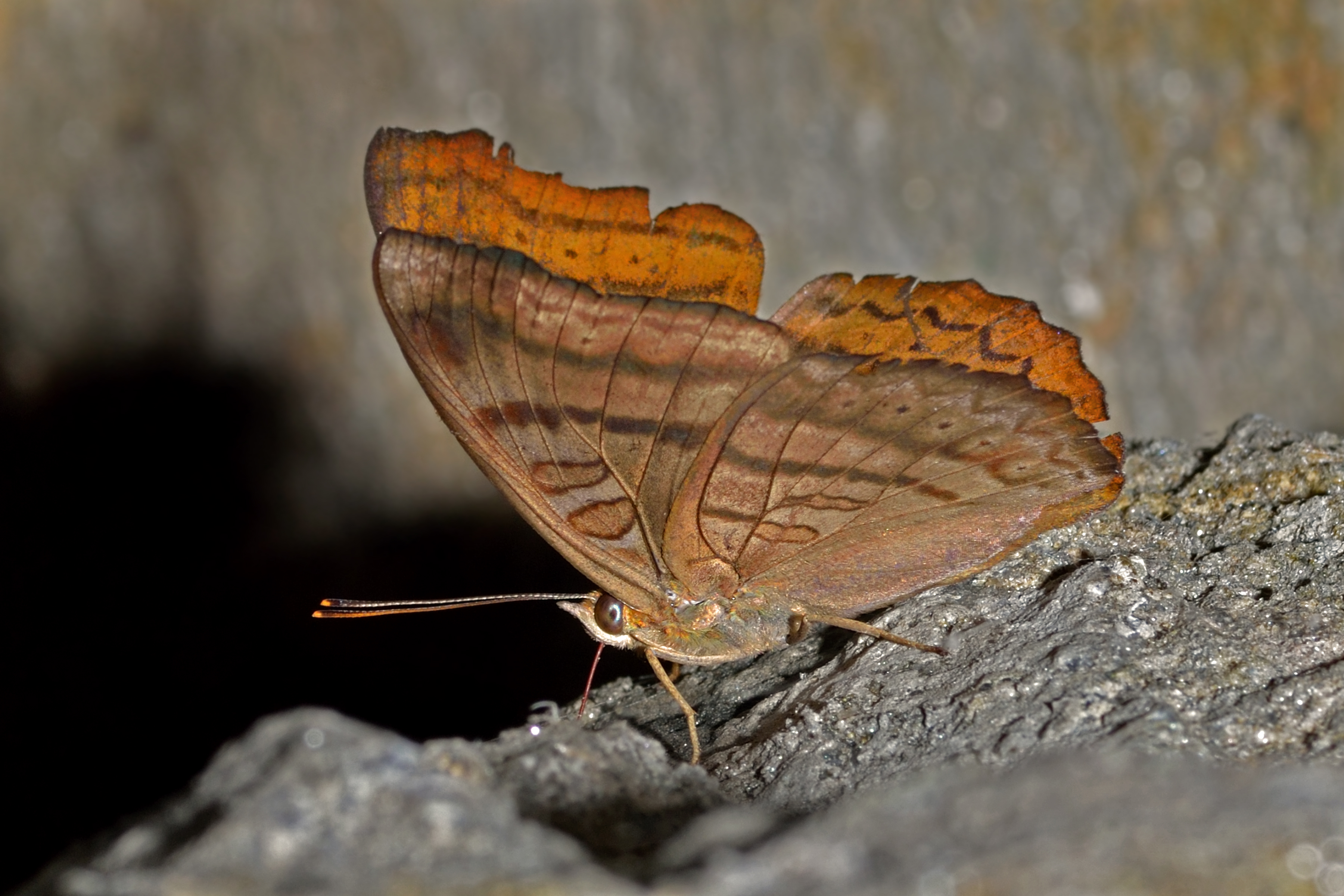
Ventral view

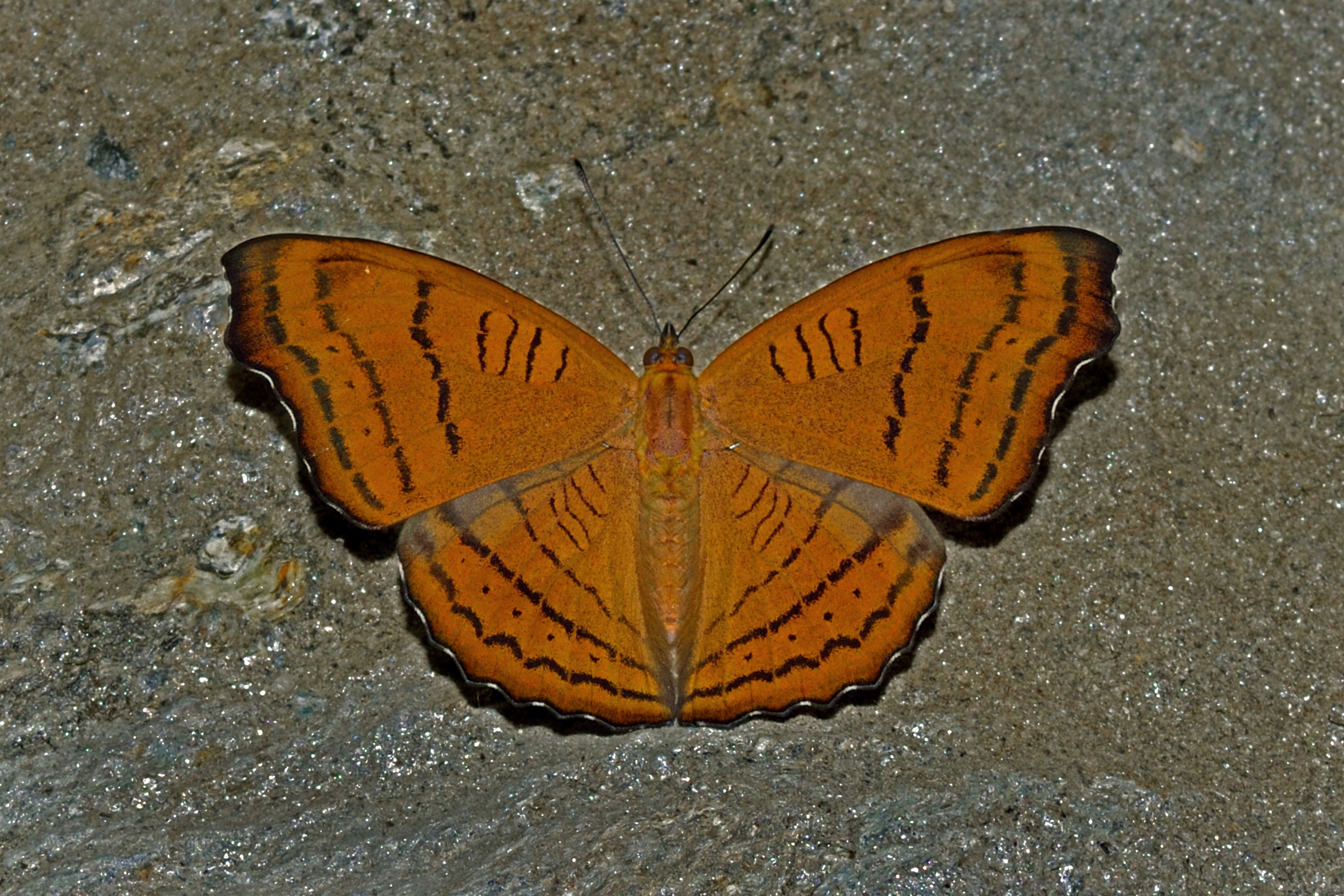
Dorsal view

==== Genus: Stibochiona ====
===== Species: Stibochiona nicea (popinjay) =====
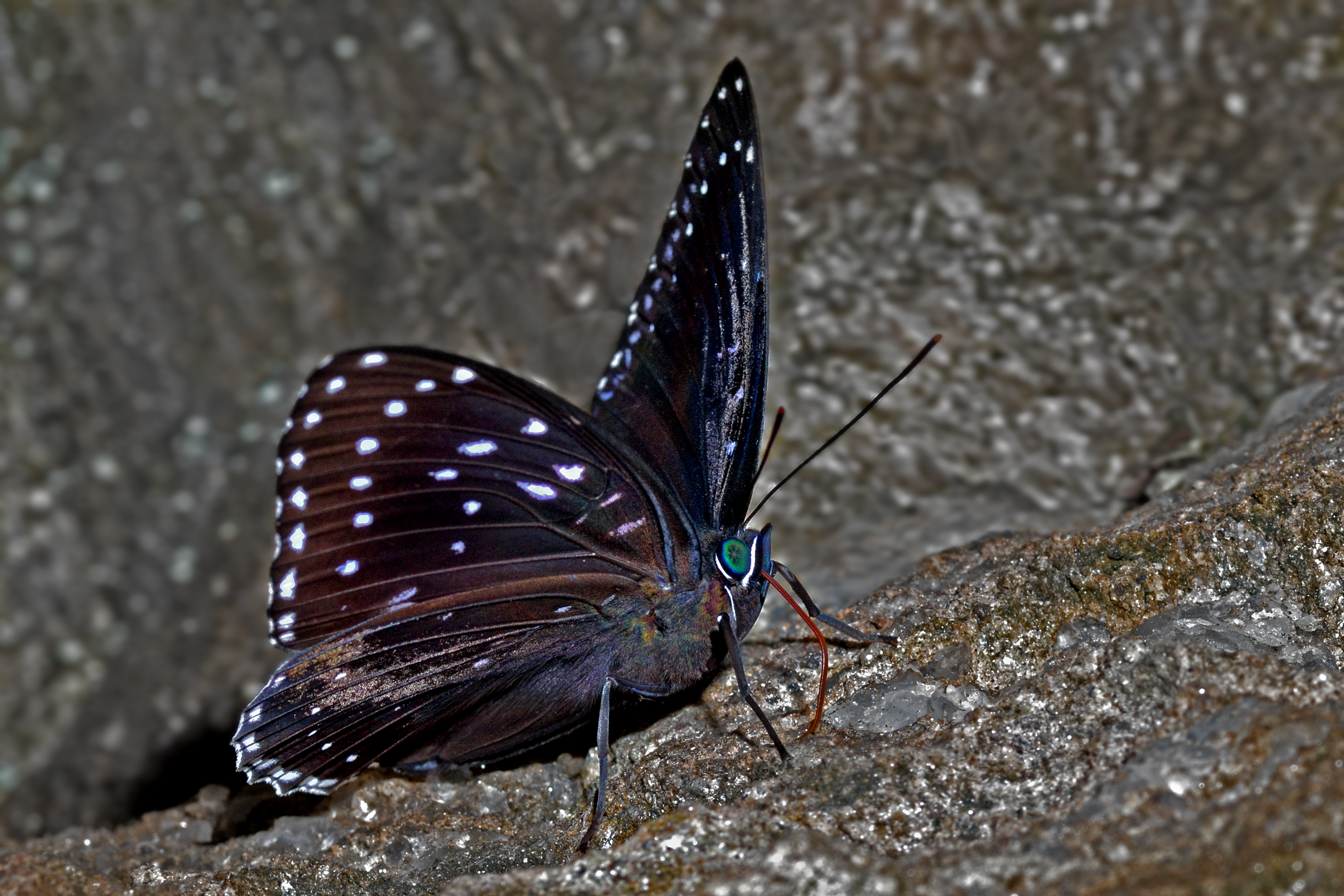
Ventral view

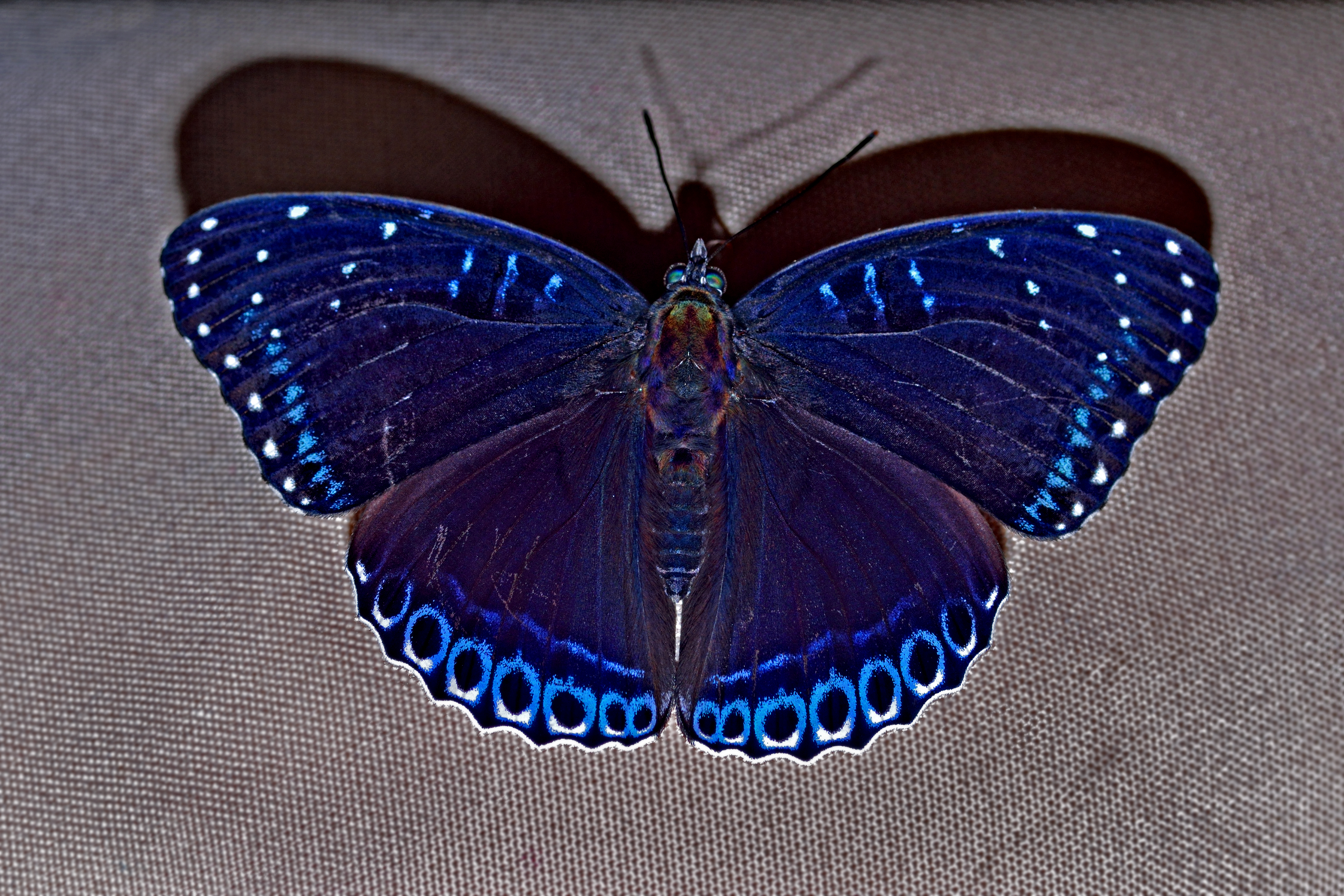
Dorsal view

=== Subfamily: Satyrinae ===
Tribe: Elymniini

==== Genus: Elymnias ====
===== Species: Elymnias malelas (spotted palmfly) =====
Subspecies: Elymnias malelas malelas (Bengal spotted palmfly)

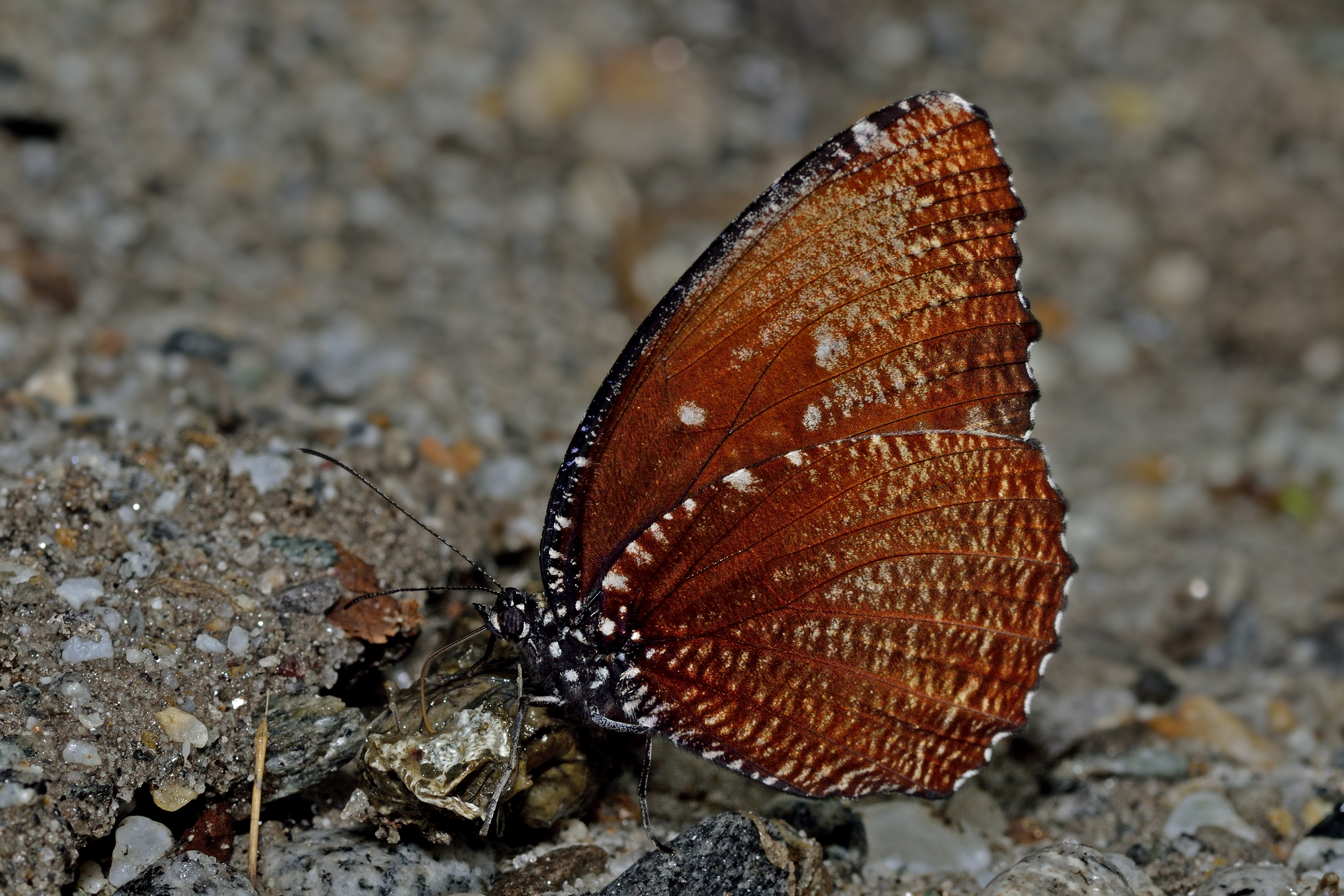
Ventral view

Tribe: Satyrini

==== Genus: Lethe ====
===== Species: Lethe verma (straight-banded treebrown) =====
Subspecies: Lethe verma sintica (east Himalayan straight-banded treebrown)

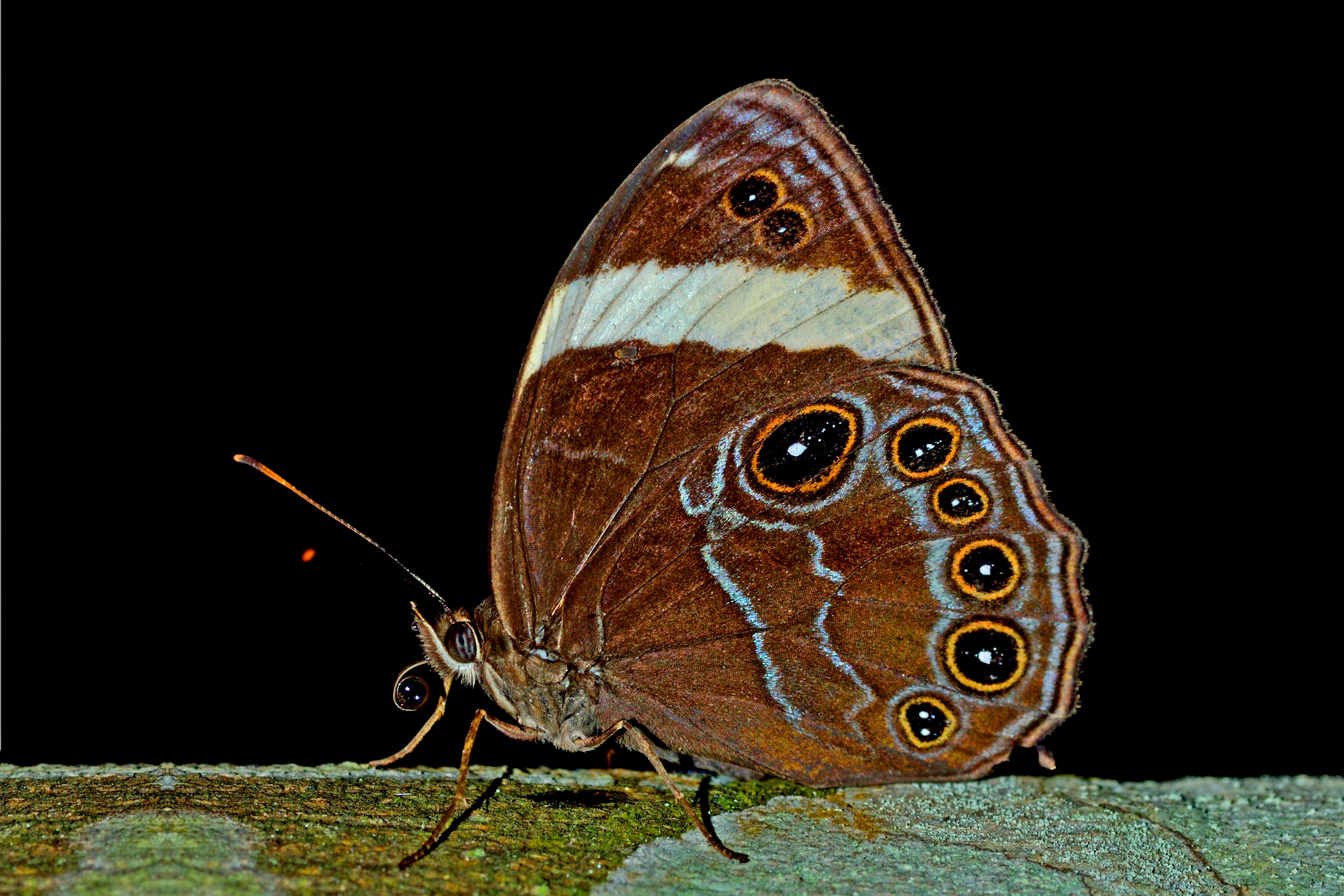
Ventral view

==== Genus: Mycalesis ====
===== Species: Mycalesis visala (long-branded bushbrown) =====
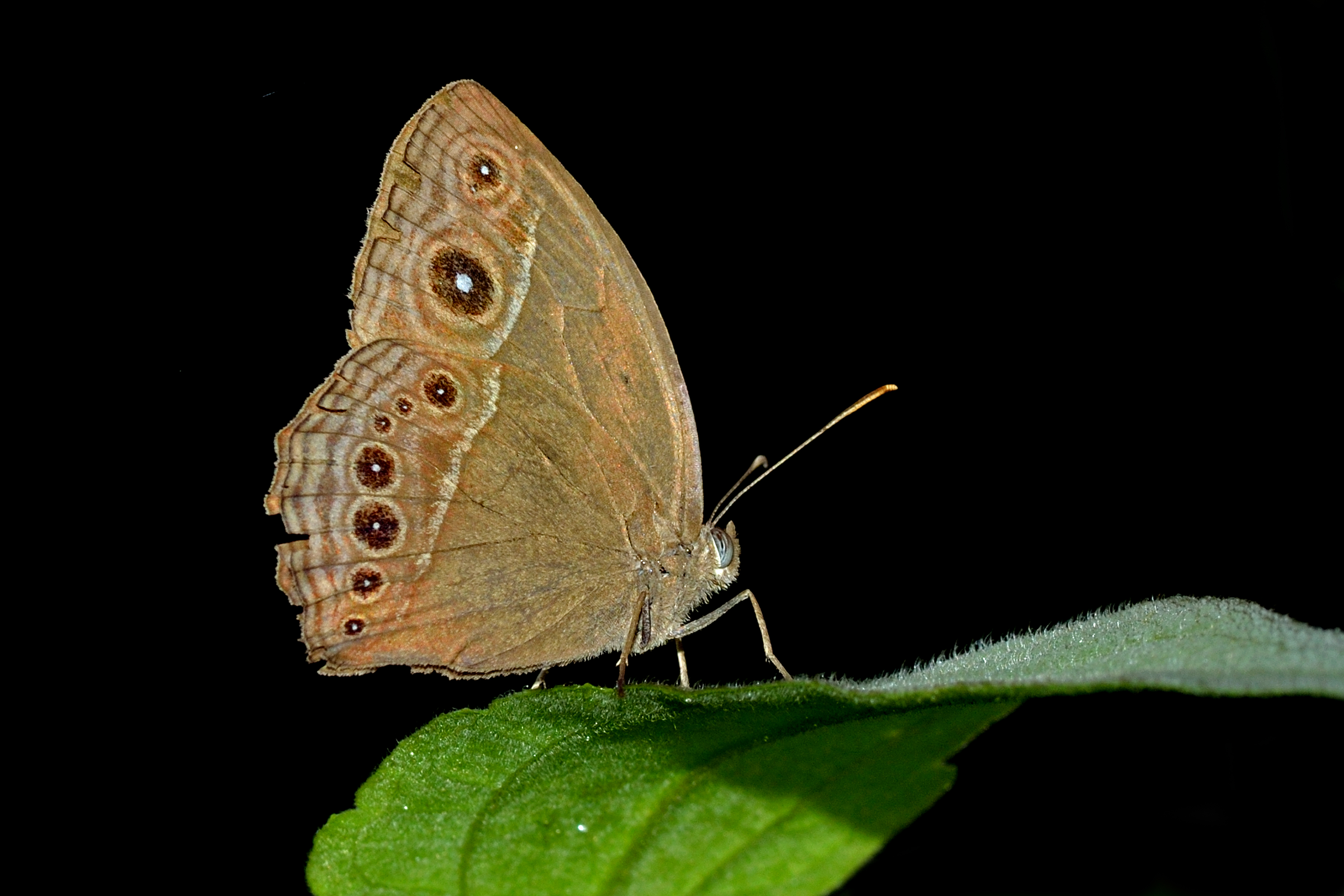
Ventral view

== Family: Riodinidae ==
=== Subfamily: Nemeobiinae ===
Tribe: Abisarini

==== Genus: Abisara ====
===== Species: Abisara chela (spot Judy) =====
Subspecies: Abisara chela chela (Sikkim spot Judy)

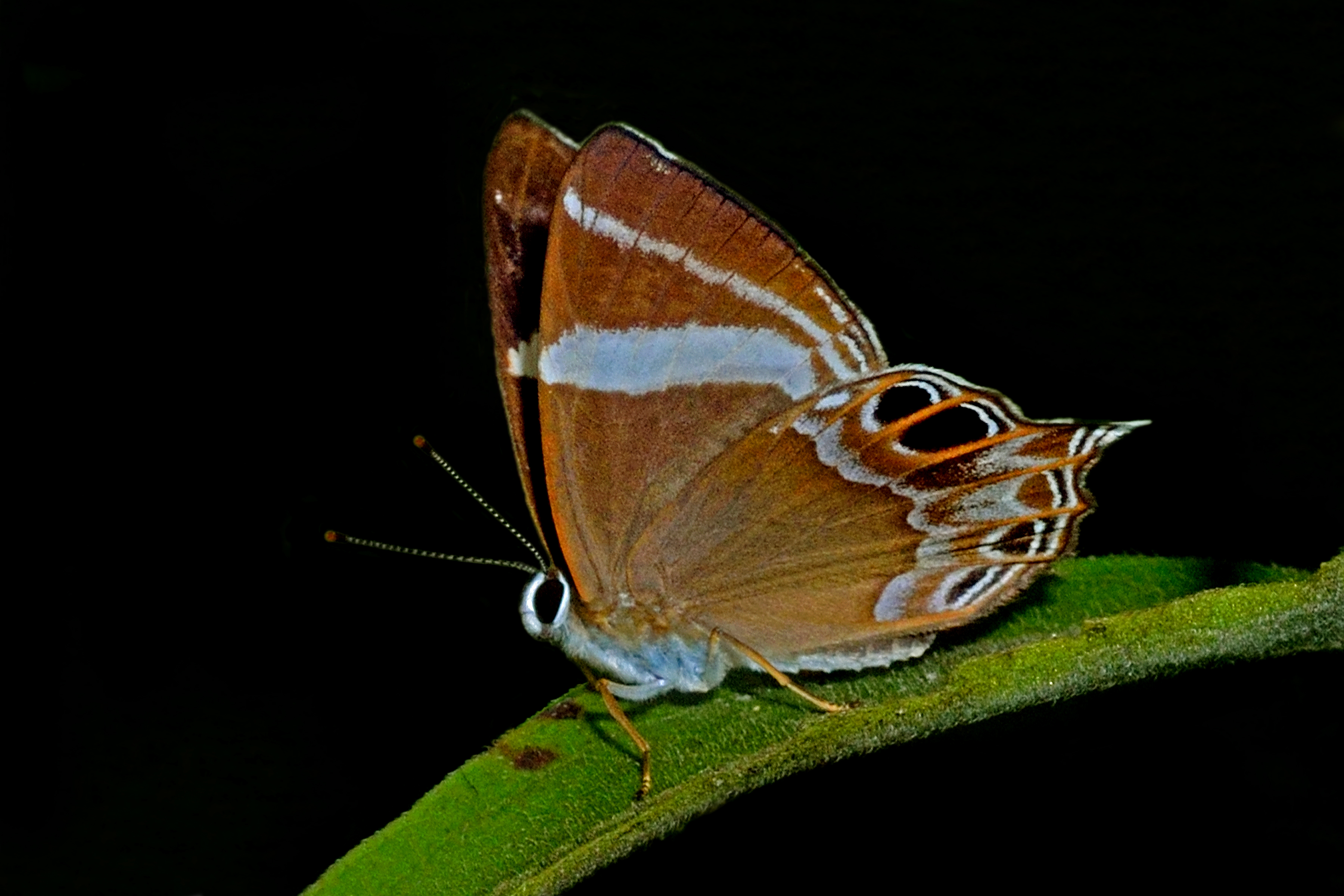
Ventral view

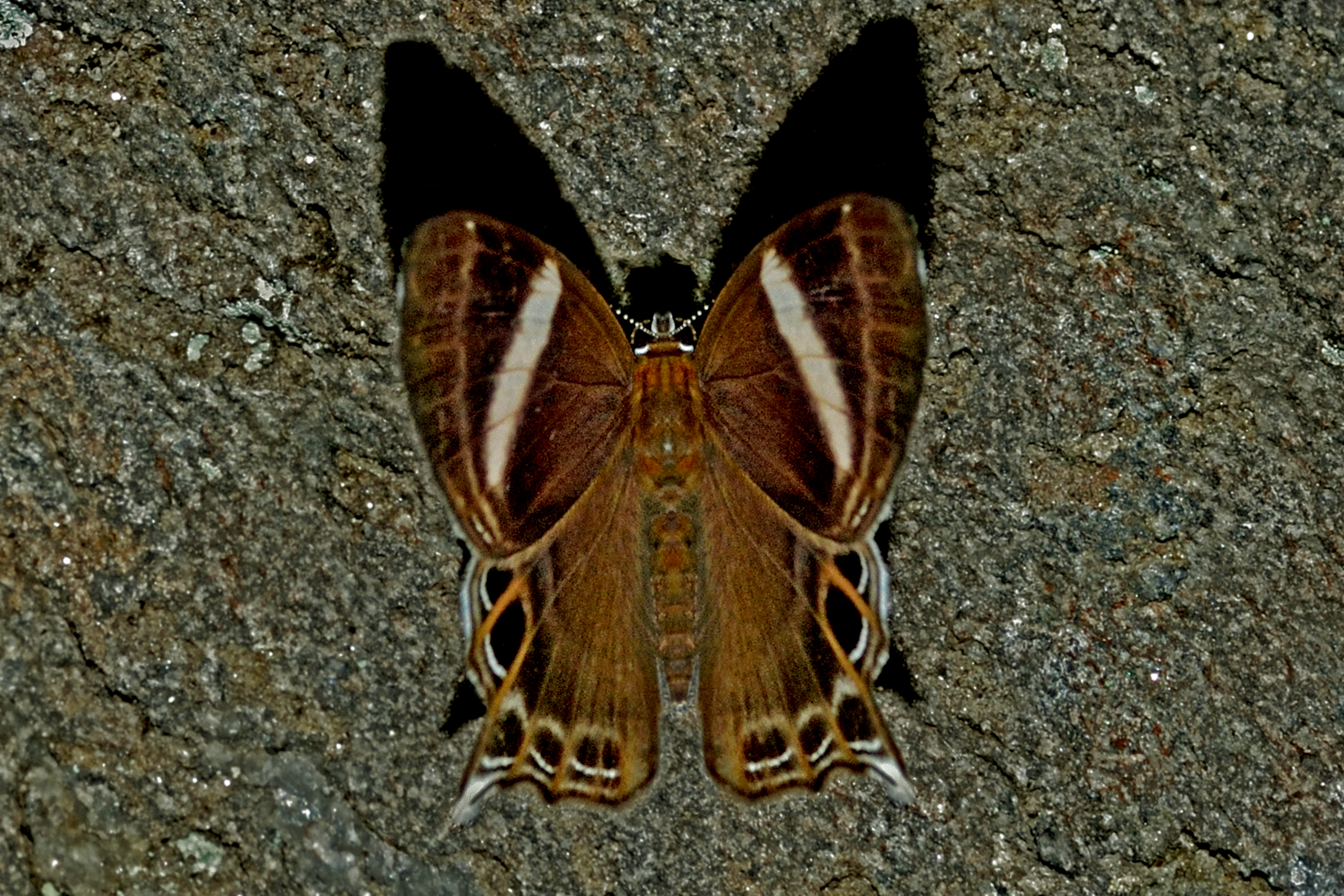
Dorsal view

Tribe: Nemeobiini

==== Genus: Zemeros ====
===== Species: Zemeros flegyas (Punchinello) =====
Subspecies: Zemeros flegyas flegyas (Himalayan Punchinello)

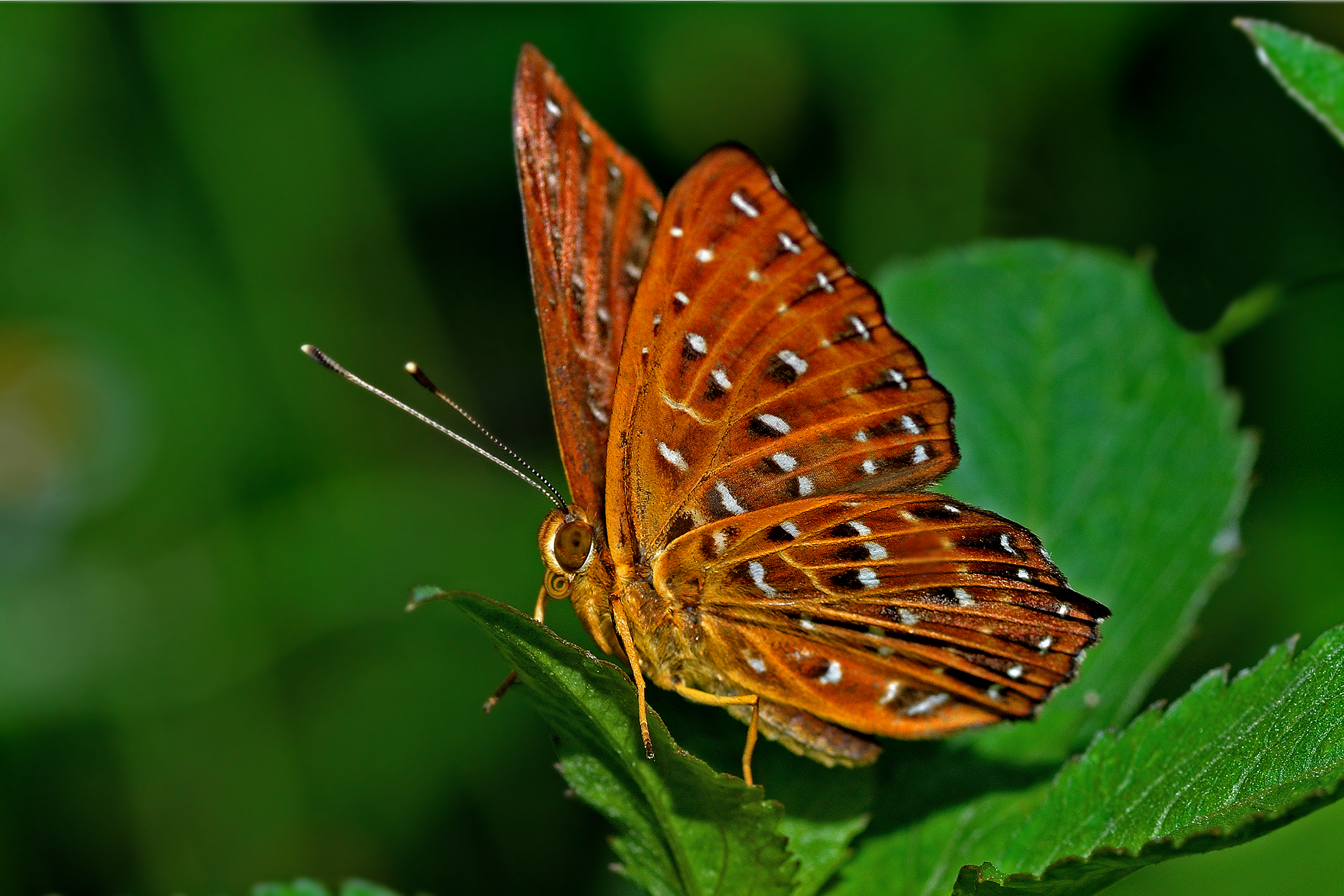
Ventral view

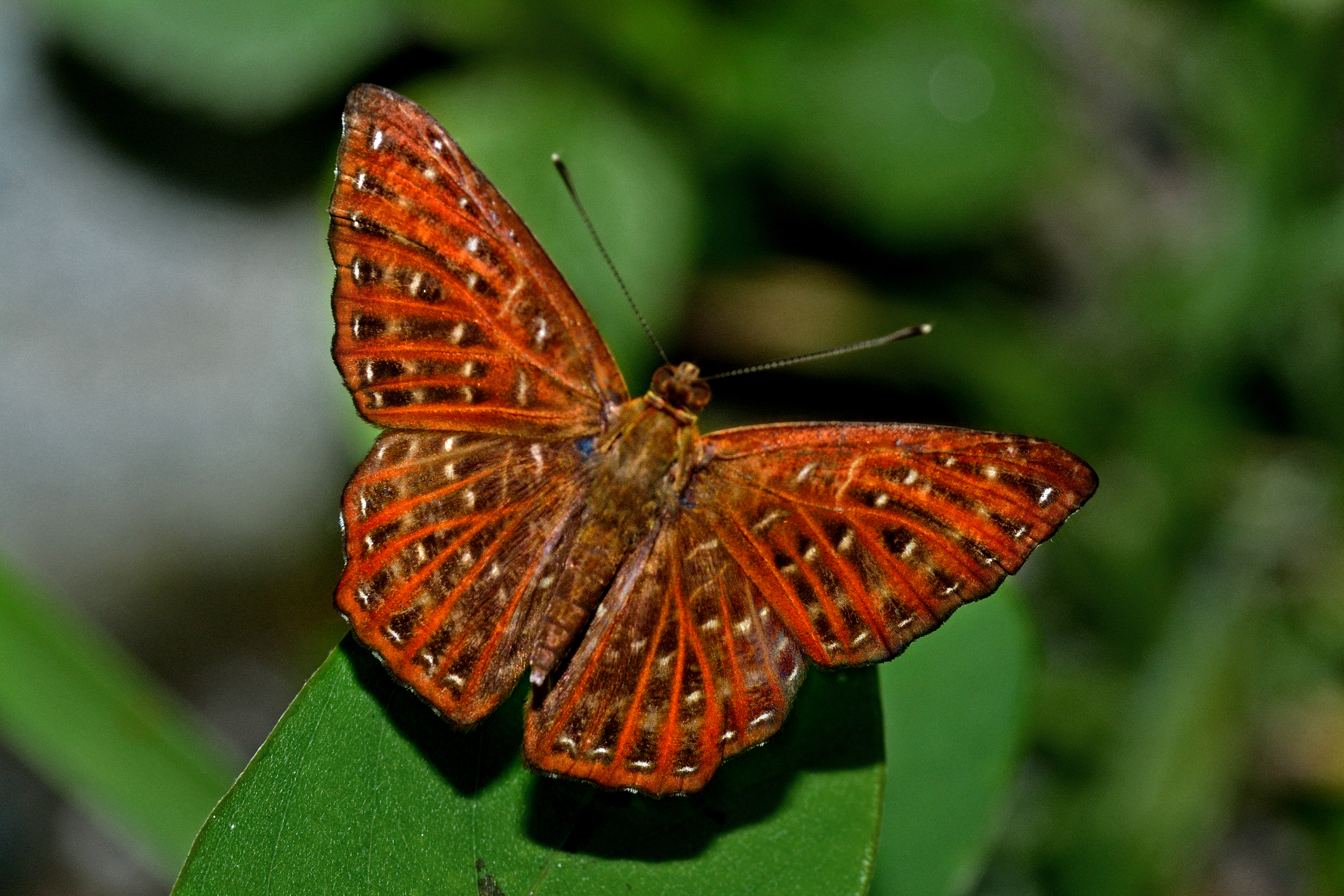
Dorsal view

== Family: Hesperiidae ==
=== Subfamily: Hesperiinae ===
Tribe: Aeromachini

==== Genus: Aeromachus ====
===== Species: Aeromachus stigmata (veined scrub hopper) =====
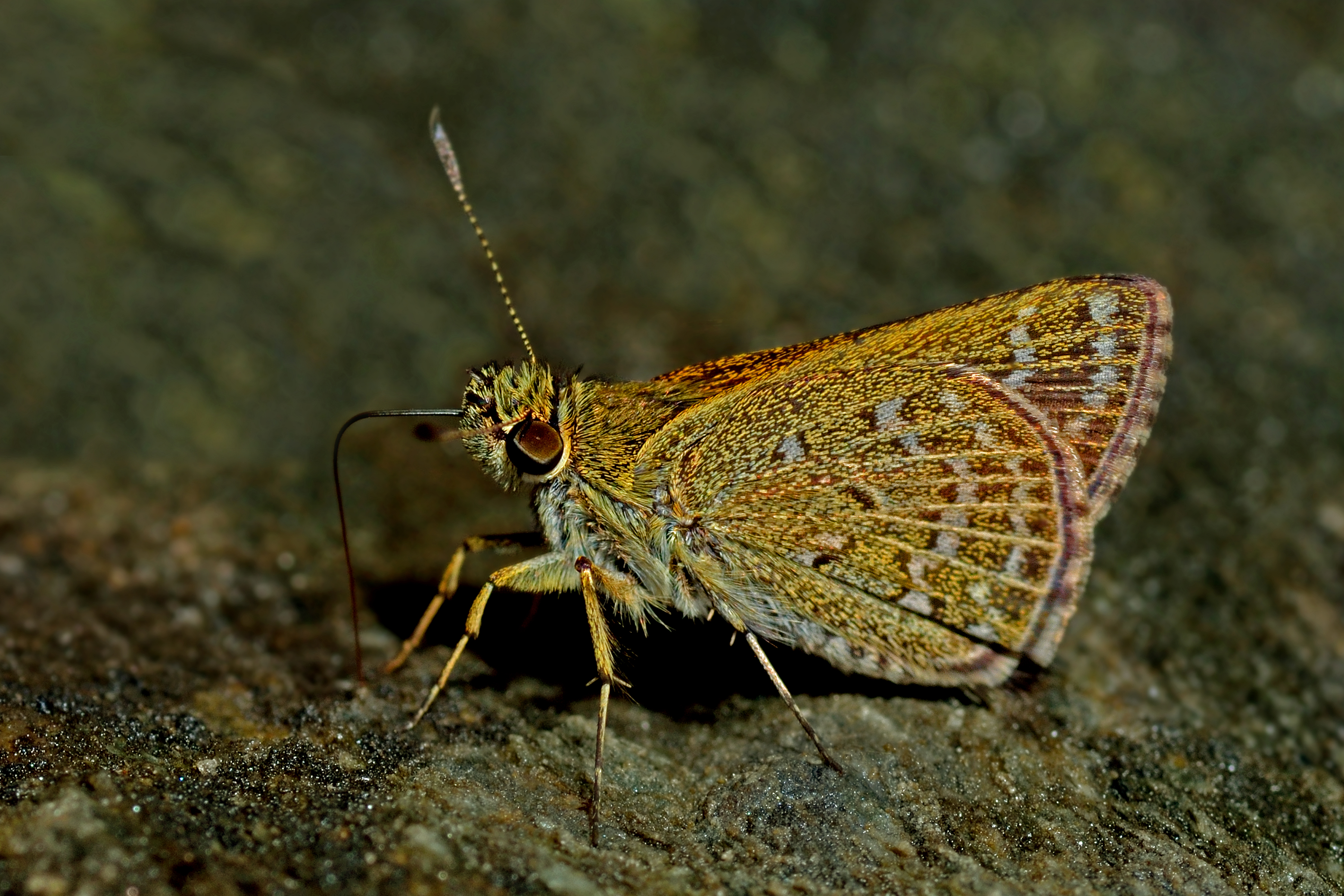
Ventral view

==== Genus: Ancistroides ====
===== Species: Ancistroides nigrita (chocolate demon) =====
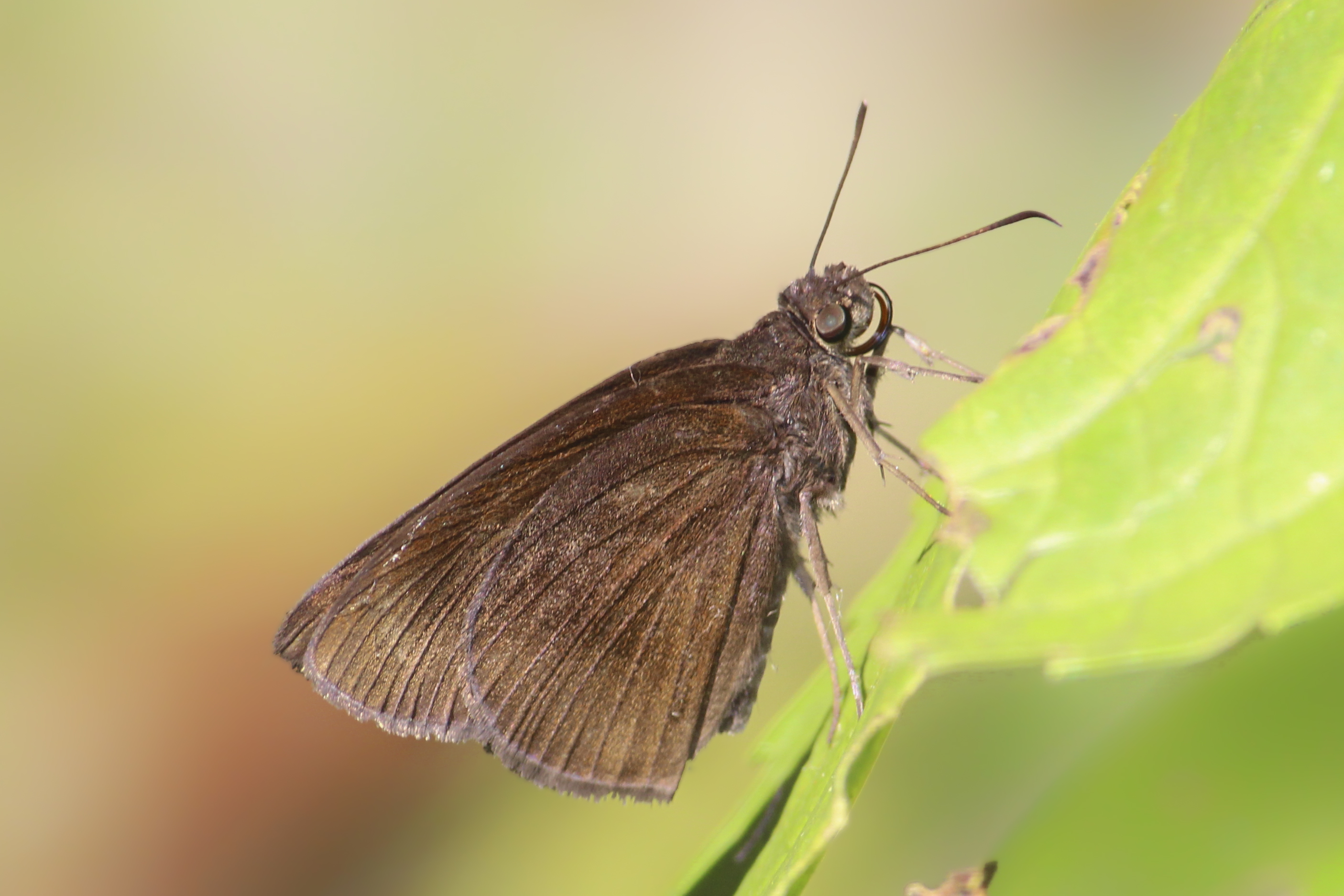
Ventral view

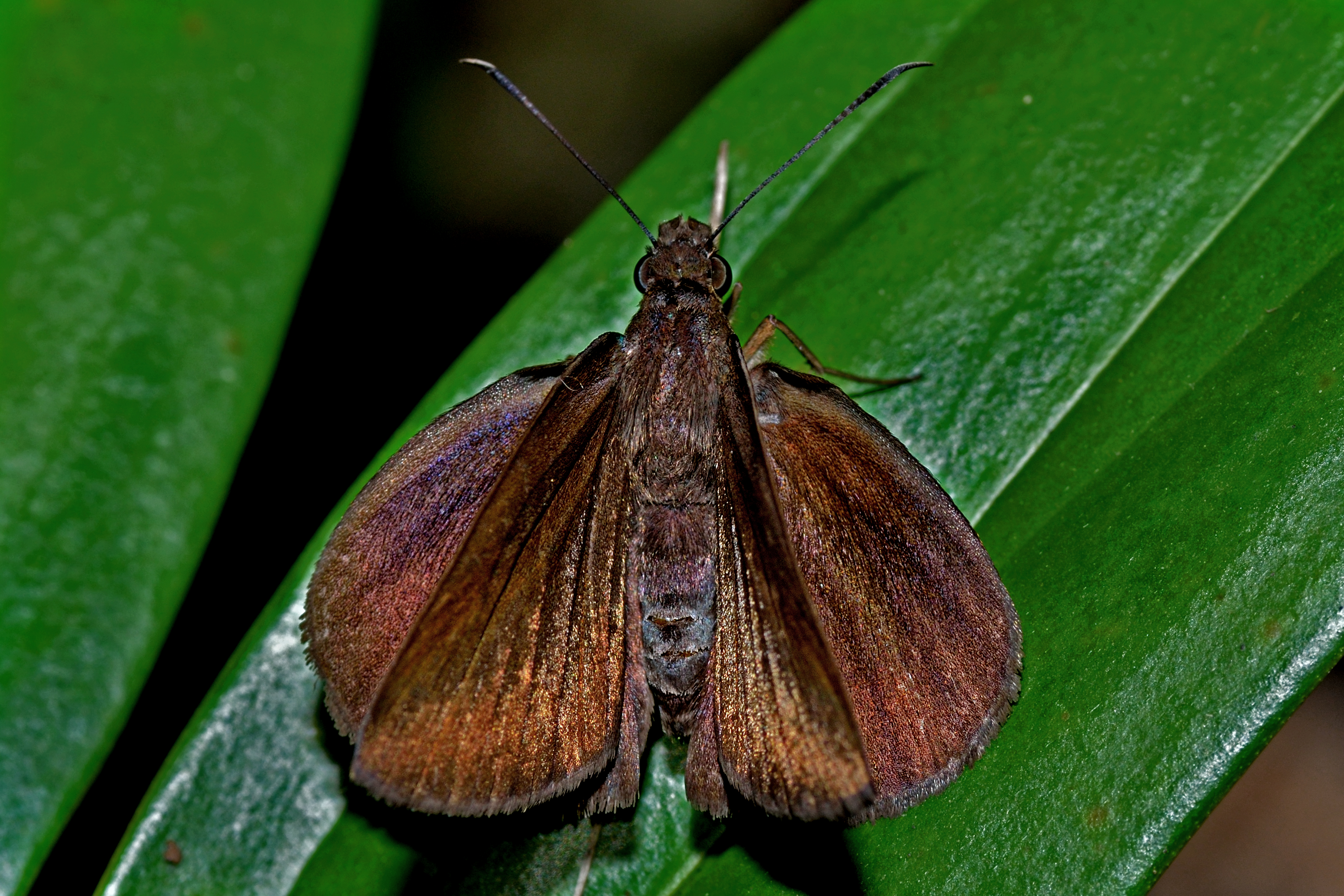
Dorsal view

==== Genus: Pedesta ====
===== Species: Pedesta pandita (brown bush bob) =====
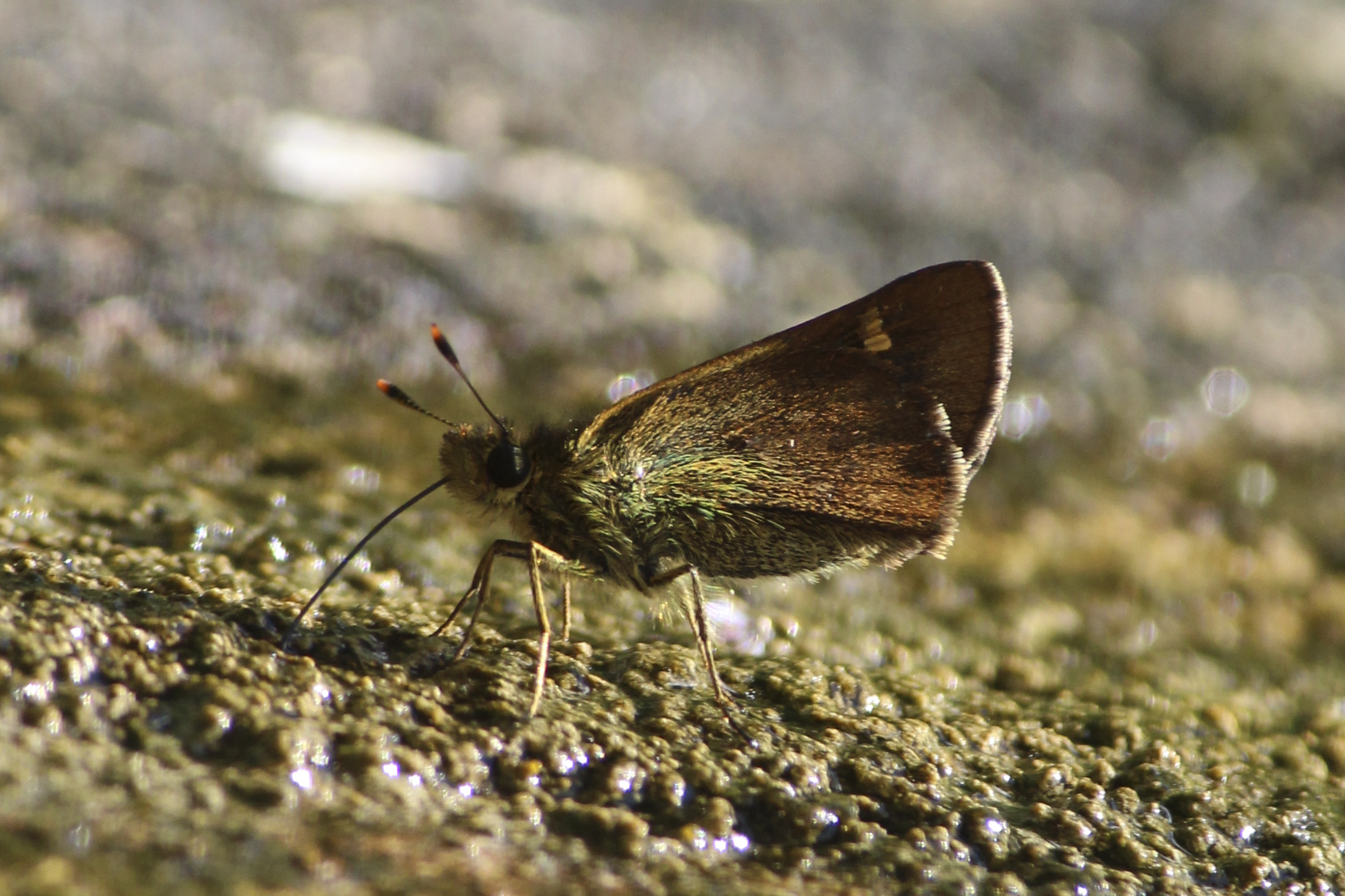
Ventral view

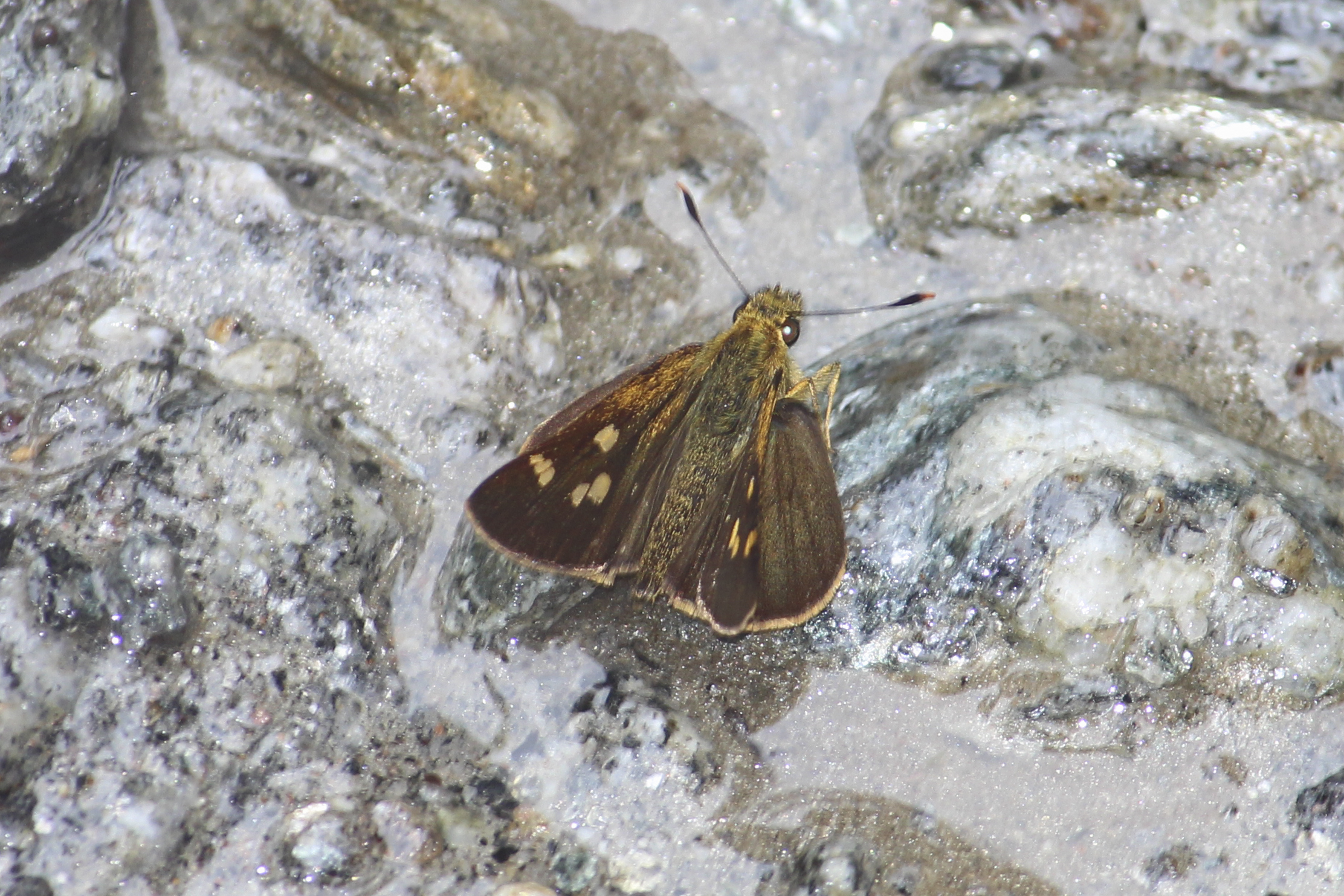
Dorsal view

==== Genus: Sebastonyma ====
===== Species: Sebastonyma dolopia (tufted ace) =====
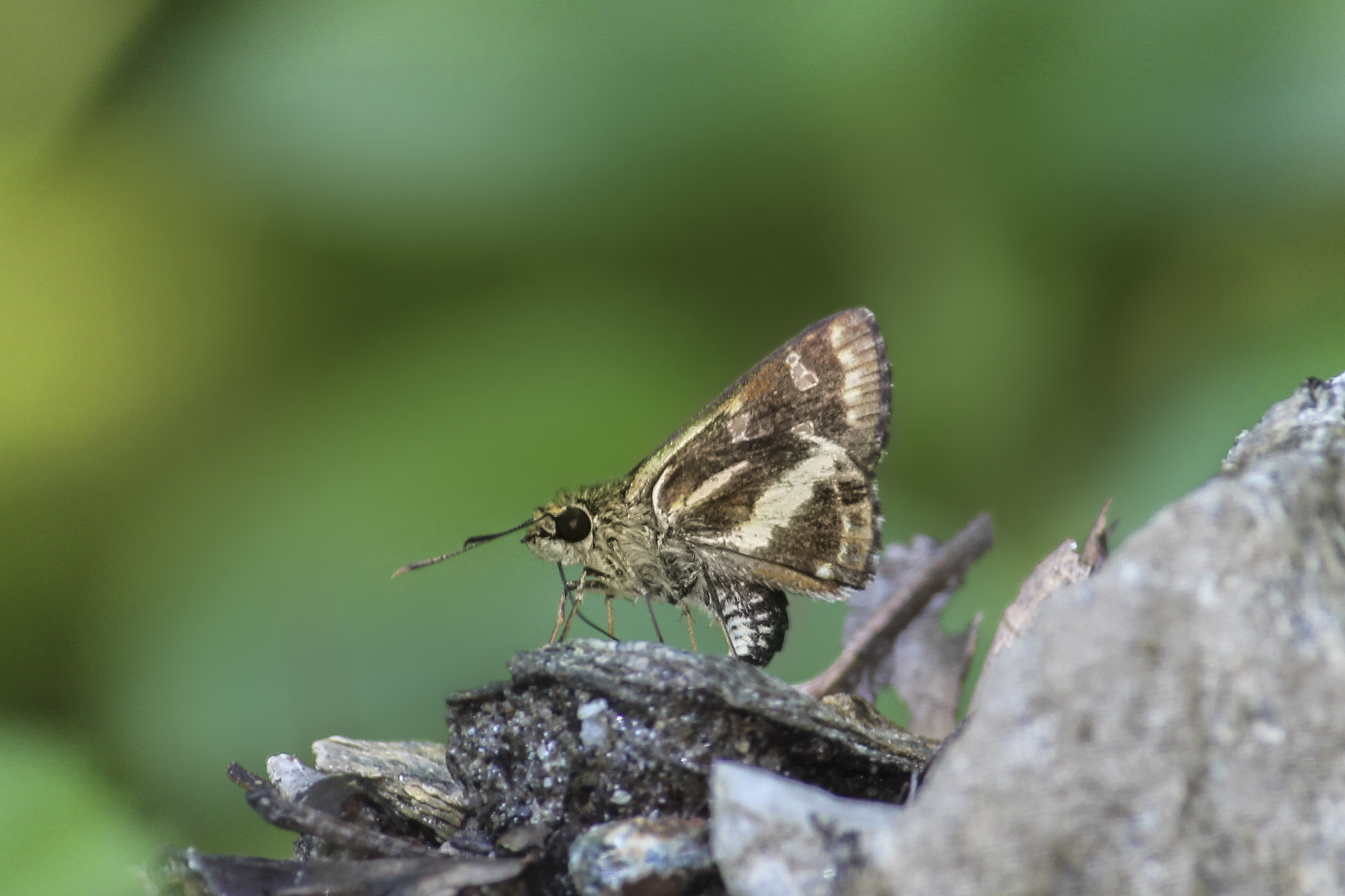
Ventral view

==== Genus: Zographetus ====
===== Species: Zographetus ogygia (purple-spotted flitter) =====
Subspecies: Zographetus ogygia ogygia (continental purple-spotted flitter)

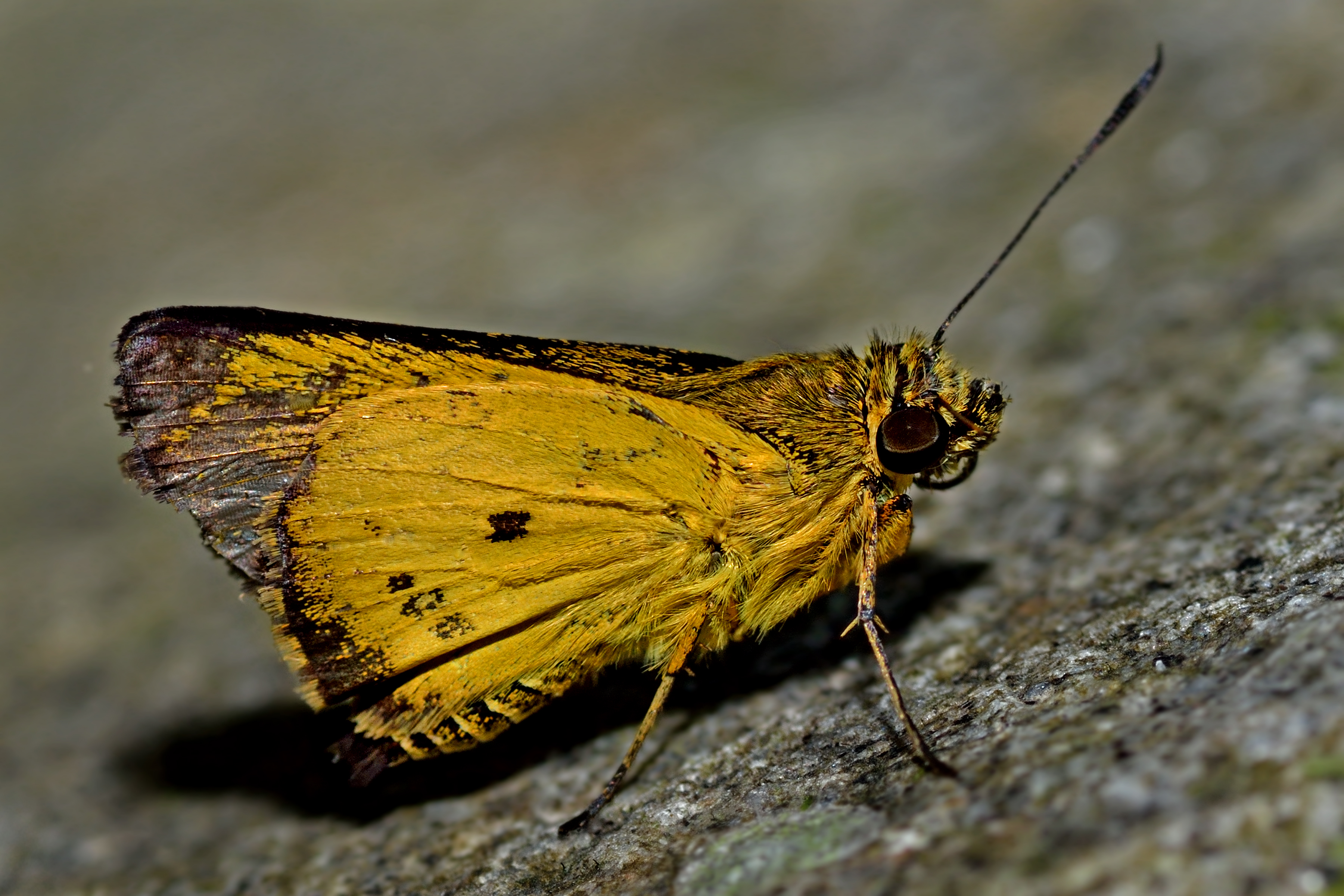
Ventral view

Tribe: Baorini

==== Genus: Pelopidas ====
===== Species: Pelopidas assamensis (great swift) =====
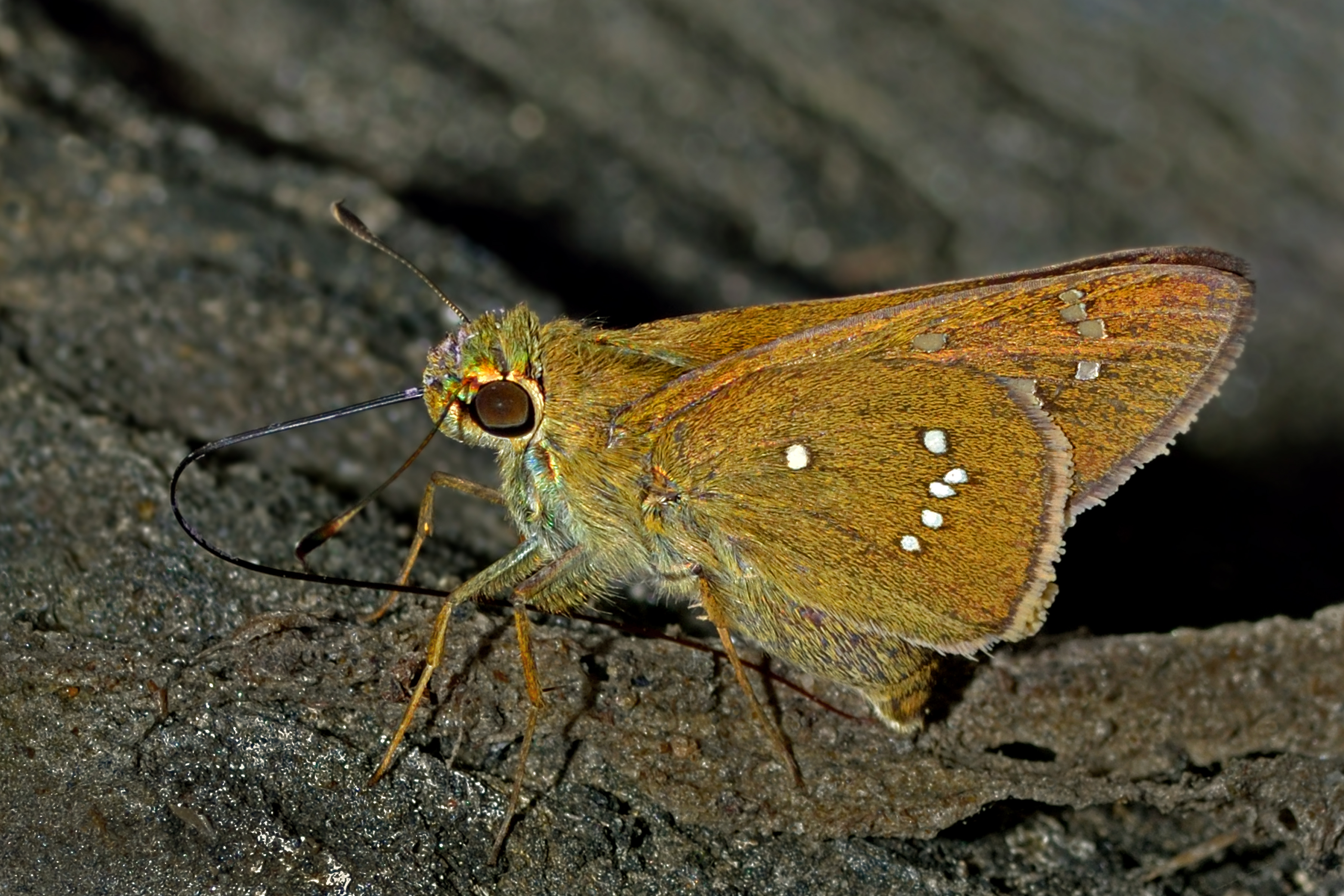
Ventral view

==== Genus: Polytremis ====
===== Species: Polytremis eltola (yellow-spot swift) =====
Subspecies: Polytremis eltola eltola (Darjeeling yellow-spot swift)

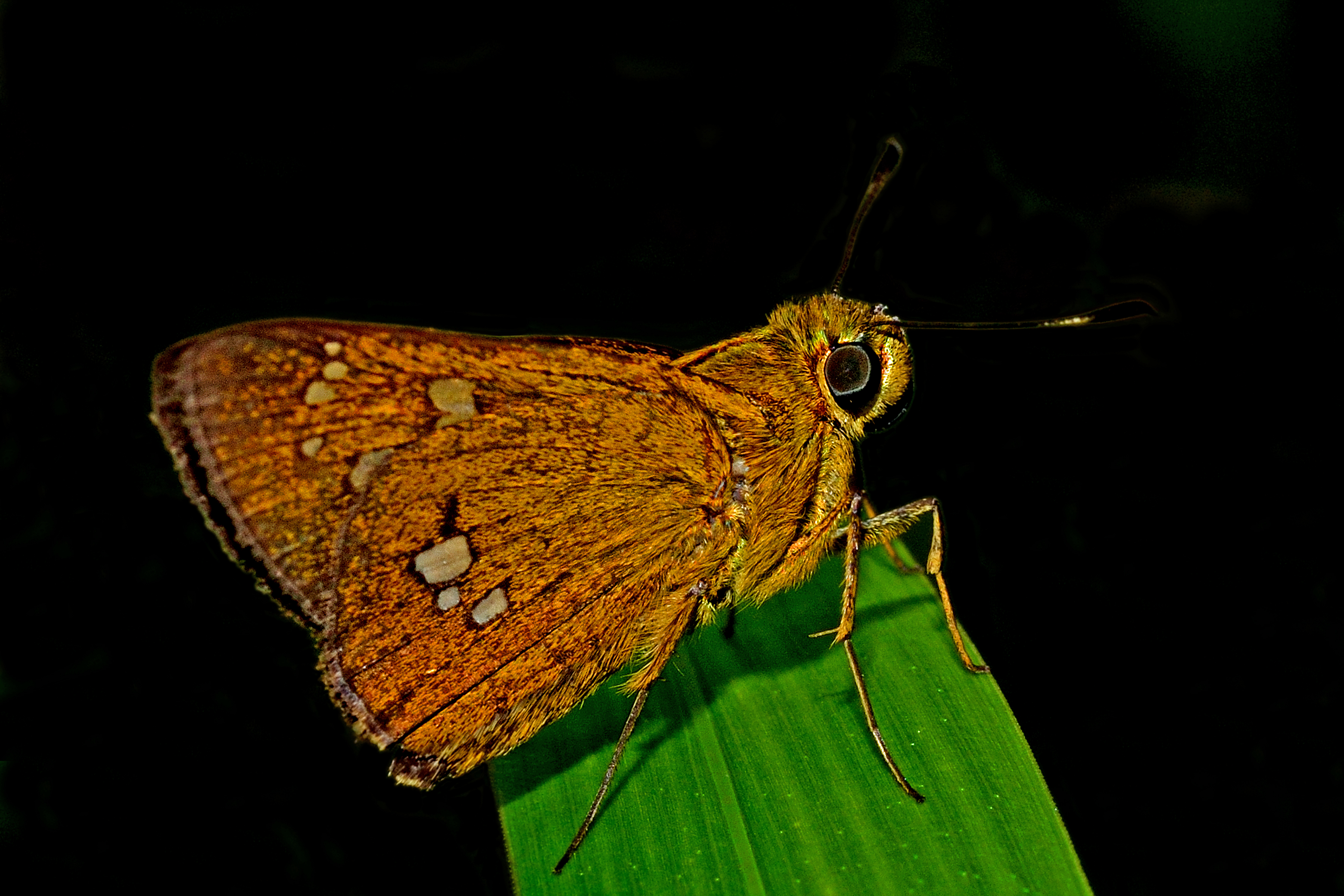
Ventral view

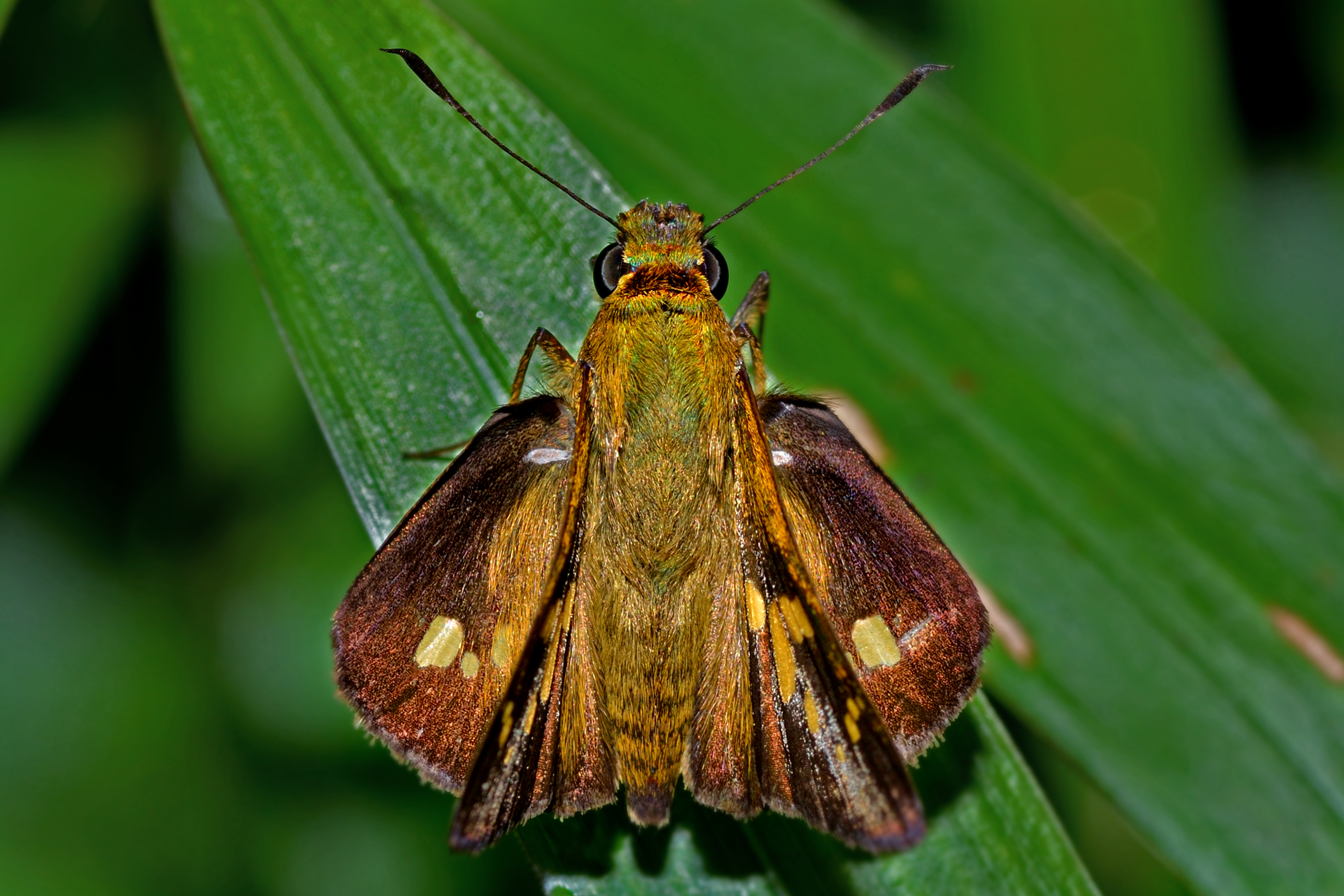
Dorsal view

Tribe: Taractrocerini

==== Genus: Telicota ====
===== Species: Telicota bambusae (dark palm-dart) =====
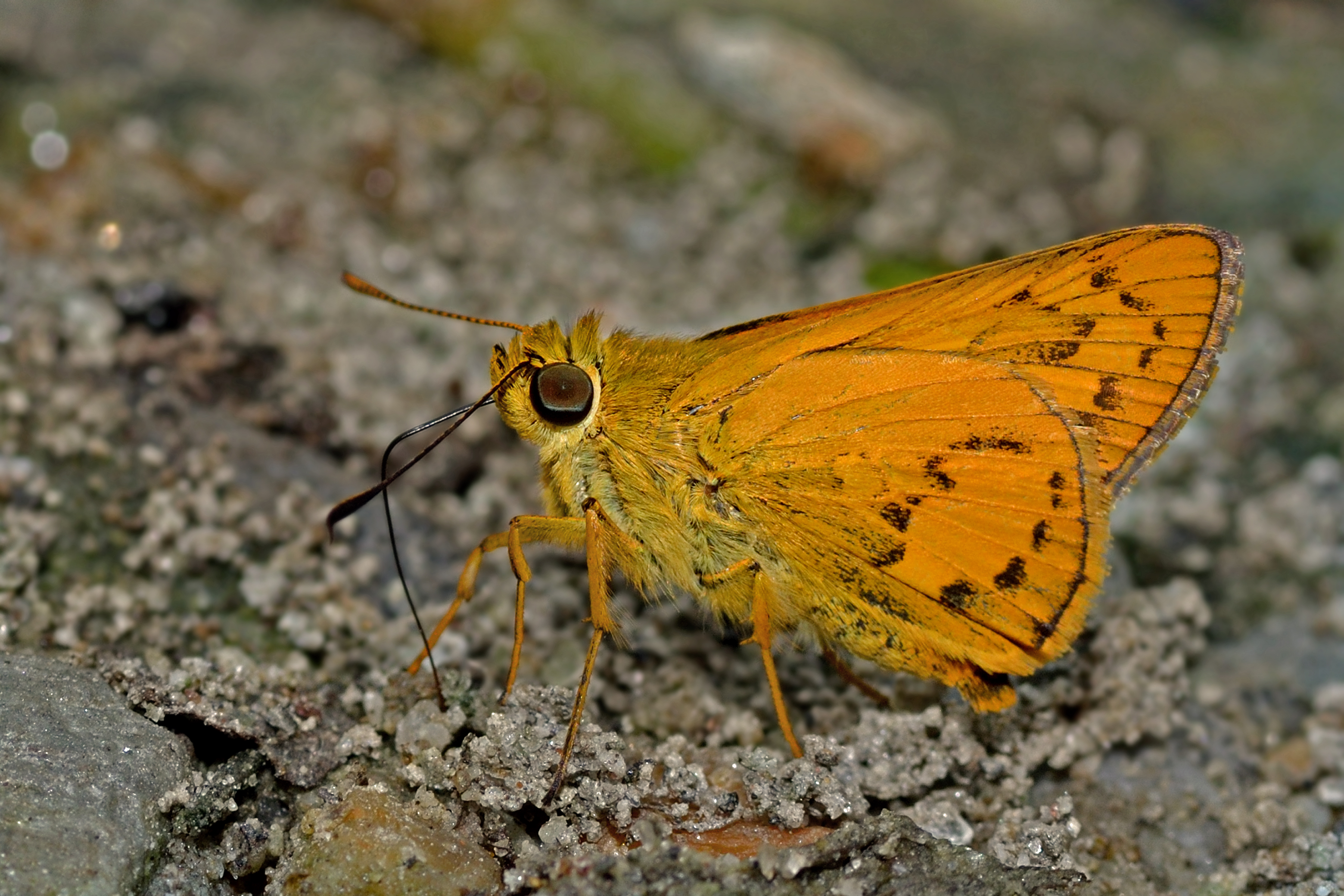
Ventral view

=== Subfamily: Pyrginae ===
Tribe: Tagiadini

==== Genus: Coladenia ====
===== Species: Coladenia indrani (tricolor pied flat) =====
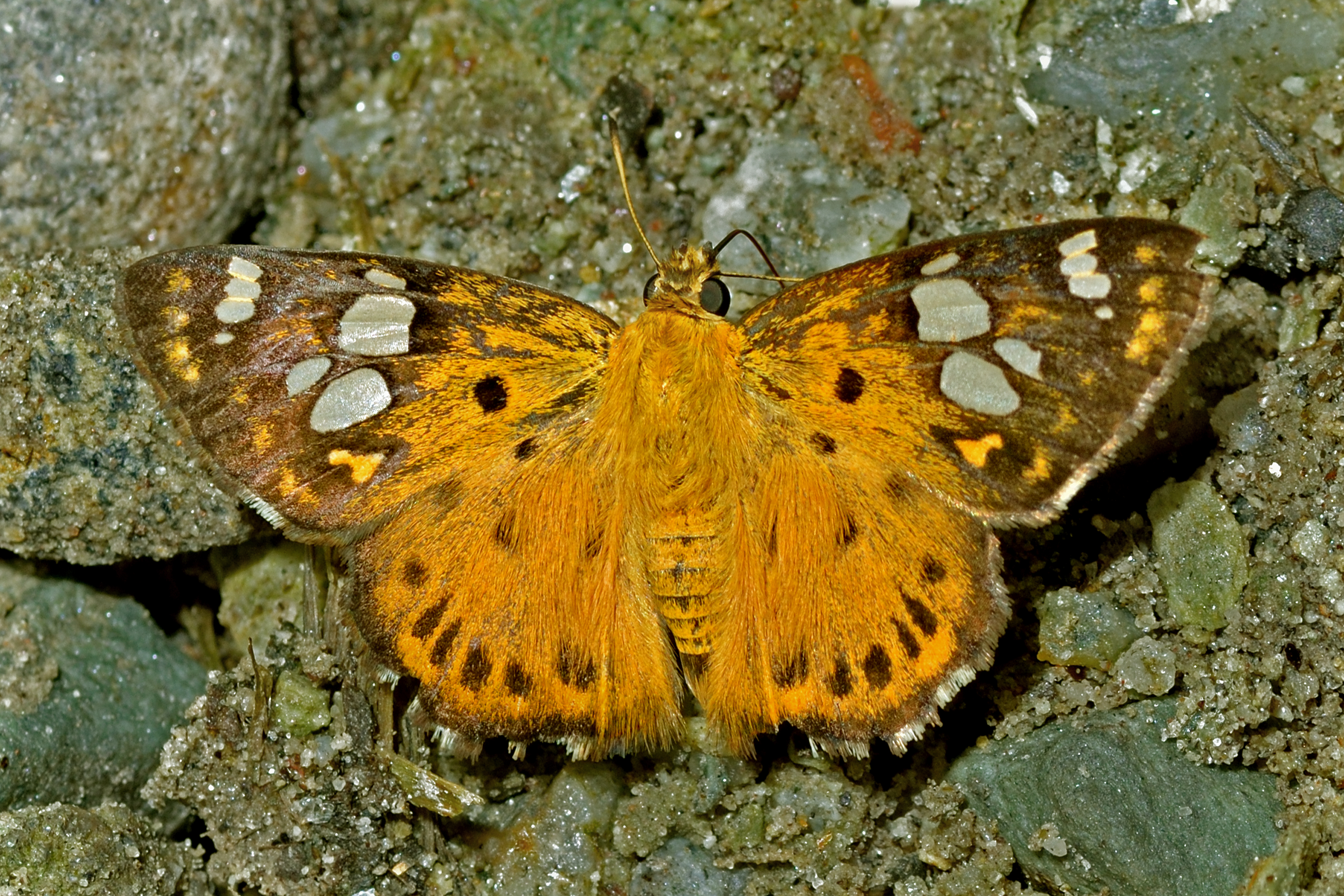
Dorsal view

==== Genus: Mooreana ====
===== Species: Mooreana trichoneura (yellow flat) =====
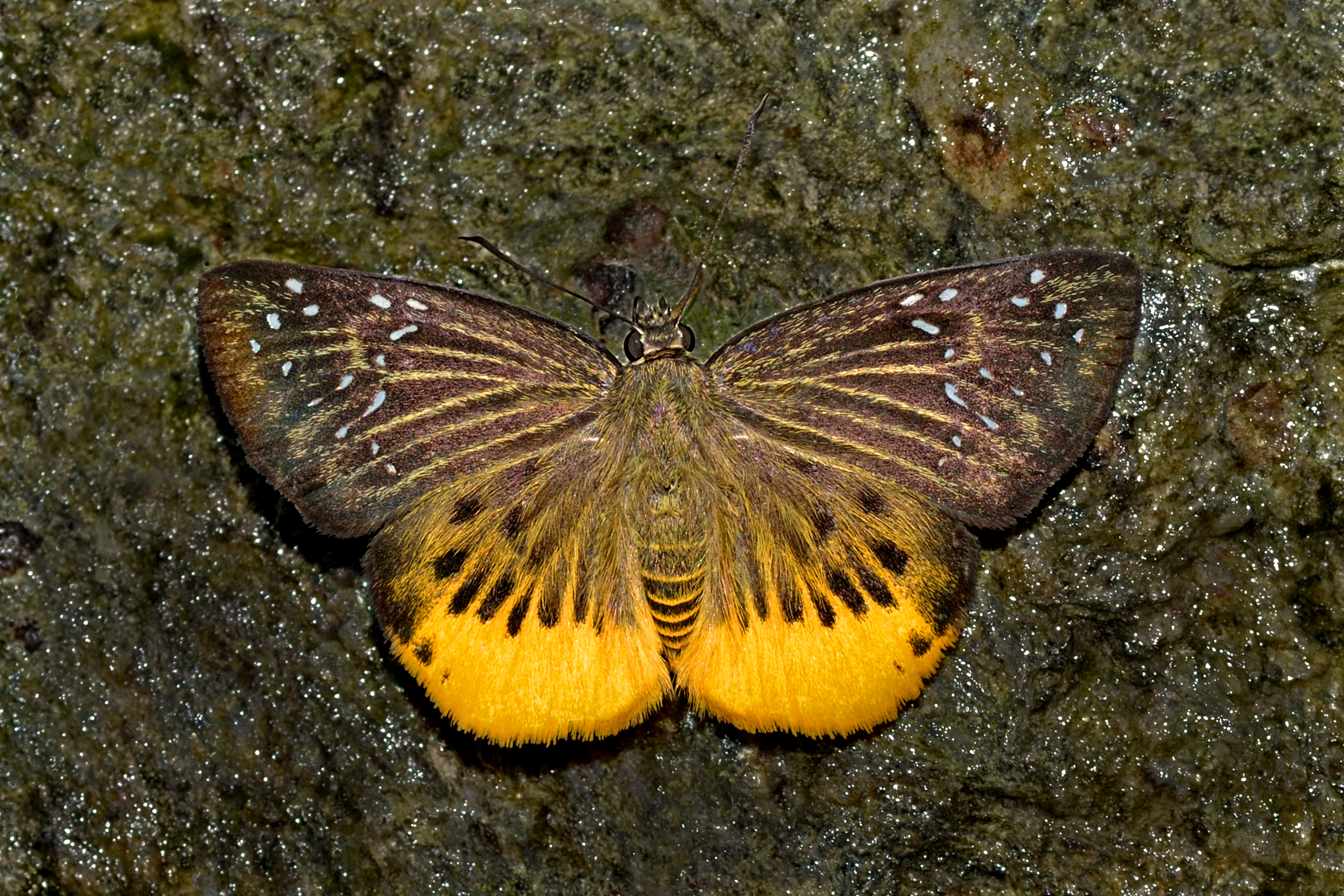
Dorsal view

==== Genus: Tagiades ====
===== Species: Tagiades menaka (spotted snow flat) =====
Subspecies: Tagiades menaka menaka (Bengal spotted snow flat)

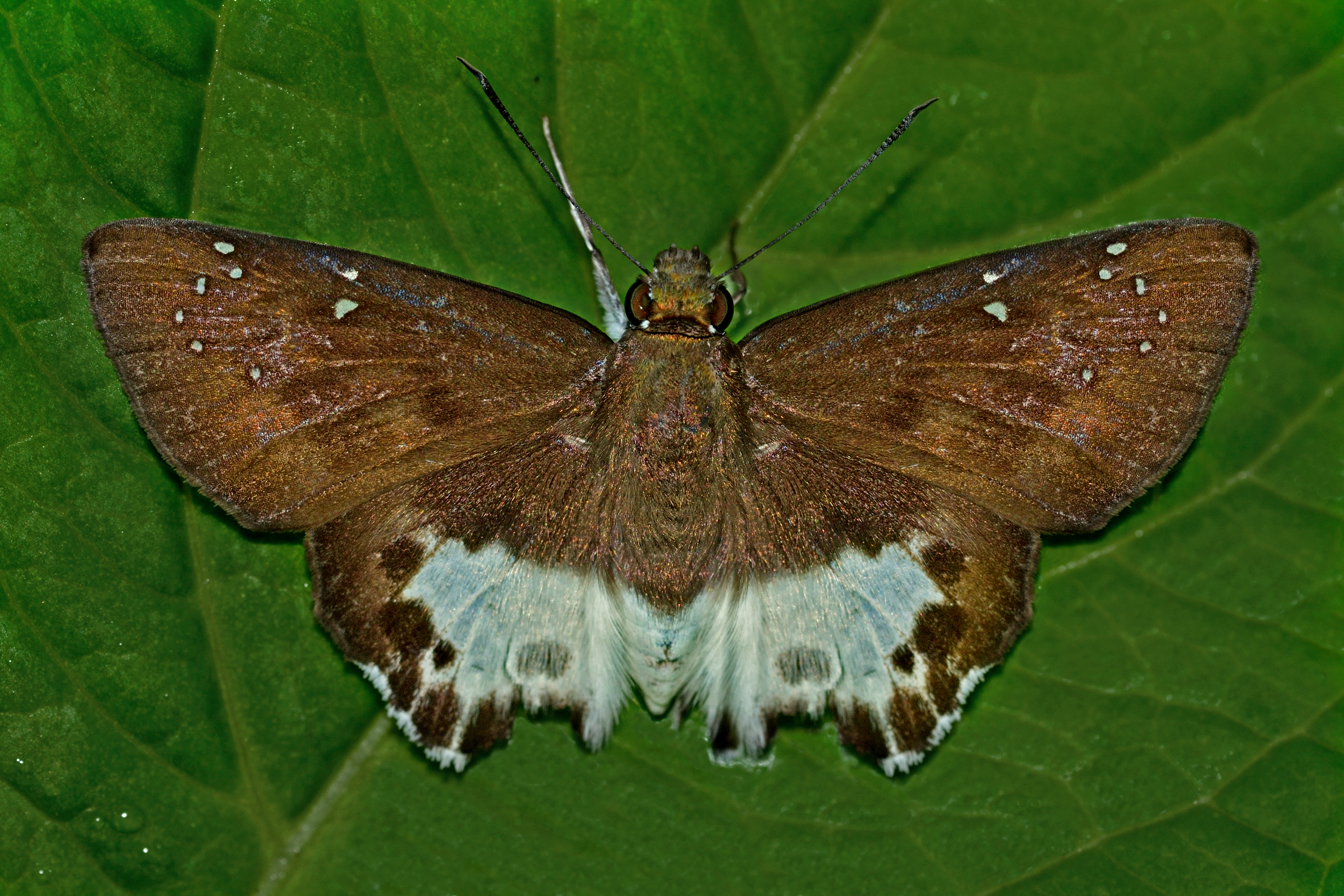
Dorsal view
