= Mimia =

Mimia or some variant thereof may refer to:

- Mimia (butterfly), a living genus of butterflies of the family Hesperiidae
- Mimia (fish), a fossil genus of fish of the class Actinopterygii
- Minister for Immigration, Citizenship and Multicultural Affairs (MIMIA), an agency in Australia
