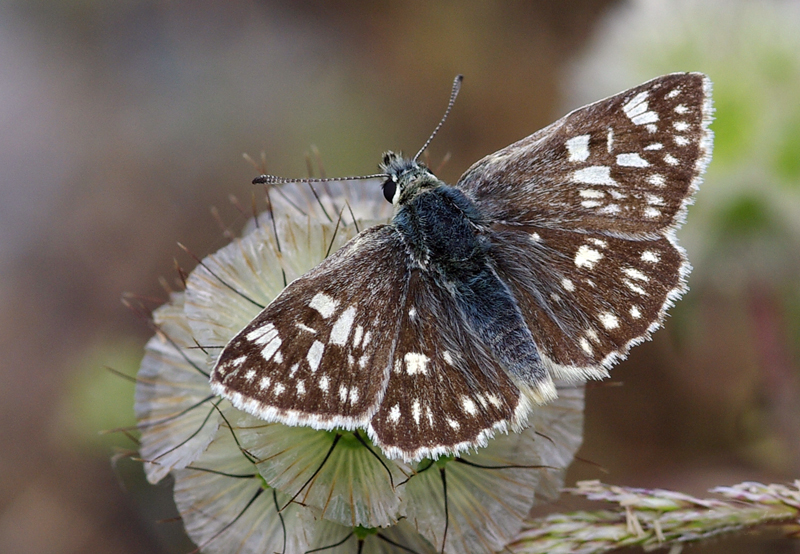
- Muschampia tessellum, Tessellated Skipper, Turkey

Scientific classification
- Kingdom: Animalia
- Phylum: Arthropoda
- Class: Insecta
- Order: Lepidoptera
- Family: Hesperiidae
- Subfamily: Pyrginae
- Tribe: Carcharodini; Verity, 1940

Diversity
- 37 genera

= Carcharodini =

Tribe of butterflies

The Carcharodini are a tribe in the skipper butterfly subfamily Pyrginae. They are a very diverse but quite plesiomorphic and inconspicuous group distributed throughout the tropics.

Formerly, when only four tribes of Pyrginae were recognized, they were included in the Pyrgini, which at that time contained a massive number of genera. But the Pyrginae have since been reorganized to make them and their tribes monophyletic, leading most modern authors to treat the Carcharodini as distinct tribe. However, the old circumscription of the Pyrgini was by and large just as correct from a phylogenetic perspective.

The tribe of the Pyrgini sensu lato most closely related to the Pyrgini sensu stricto are the strikingly different Achlyodidini. As many consider it desirable to treat this lineage as a distinct tribe, the Carcharodini naturally need to be considered distinct too.

== Genera ==
These genera belong to the tribe Carcharodini:

- Agyllia Grishin, 2020
- Arteurotia Butler & H. Druce, 1872
- Austinus Mielke & Casagrande, 2016
- Bolla Mabille, 1903
- Burca Bell & Comstock, 1948
- Carcharodus Hübner, [1819]
- Clytius Grishin, 2019
- Conognathus Felder & Felder, 1862
- Cyclosemia Mabille, 1878 (eyed skippers)
- Ernsta Grishin, 2020
- Favria Tutt, 1906
- Fuscocimex Austin, 2008
- Gomalia Moore, 1879 (marbled or African mallow skippers)
- Gorgopas Godman & Salvin, 1894
- Hesperopsis Dyar, 1905 (sootywings)
- Iliana Bell, 1937
- Incisus Grishin, 2019
- Jera Lindsey, 1925
- Mictris Evans, 1955
- Mimia Evans, 1953
- Morvina Evans, 1953
- Muschampia Tutt, 1906
- Myrinia Evans, 1953
- Nisoniades Hübner, 1819
- Noctuana E. Bell, 1937
- Ocella Evans, 1953
- Pachyneuria Mabille, 1888
- Pellicia Herrich-Schaffer, 1870
- Perus Grishin, 2019
- Pholisora Scudder, 1872 (sootywings)
- Polyctor Evans, 1953
- Sophista Plötz, 1879
- Spialia Swinhoe, 1912 (grizzled skippers & sandmen)
- Staphylus Godman & Salvin, 1896 (scallopwings)
- Viola Evans, 1953 (Viola skippers)
- Viuria Grishin, 2019
- Windia H. Freeman, 1969
- Xispia Lindsey, 1925
