= Gorgopas =

Gorgopas can refer to:

- Gorgopas (4th century BC), Spartan commander in the Corinthian War
- Gorgopas (2nd century BC), Spartan commander in the Roman-Spartan War
- Gorgopas (butterfly), a skipper butterfly genus
