= Coladenia similis =

Scientific classification
- Kingdom: Animalia
- Phylum: Arthropoda
- Class: Insecta
- Order: Lepidoptera
- Family: Hesperiidae
- Genus: Coladenia
- Species: C. similis

Binomial name
- Coladenia similis de Jong & Treadaway, 1992

Synonyms
- Tapena laxmi Semper, 1892 (in partim); Coladenia semperi Chiba et al, 1991 (in partim)

Species of butterfly

Coladenia similis is a species of spread-winged skipper butterflies endemic to the Philippines.
