= Ocilla =

Ocilla may refer to:

- Ocilla, Georgia, a town in the United States
- Aucilla River, earlier also known as Ocilla, a river in Georgia and Florida, United States
- OCILLA, the Online Copyright Infringement Liability Limitation Act

== See also ==
- Ocella
