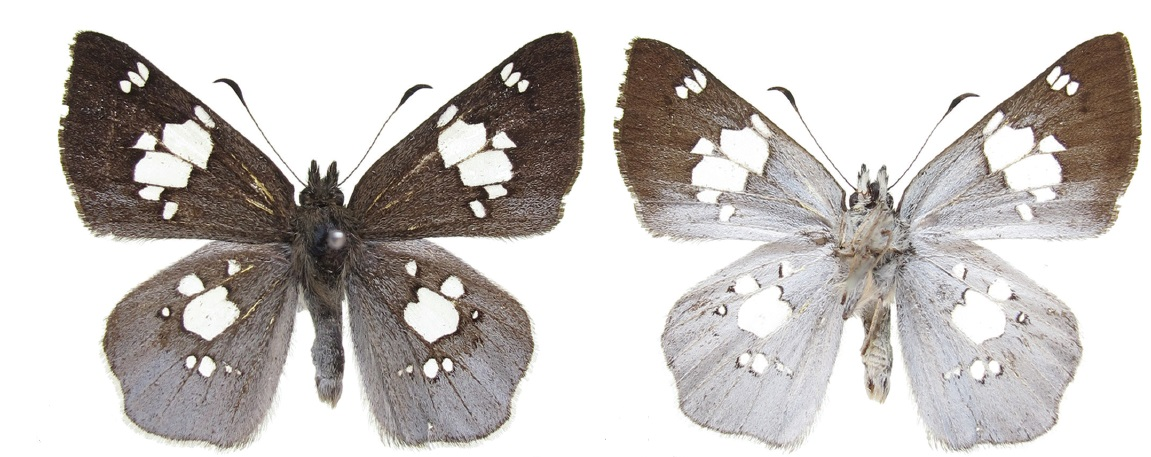

Scientific classification
- Kingdom: Animalia
- Phylum: Arthropoda
- Class: Insecta
- Order: Lepidoptera
- Family: Hesperiidae
- Genus: Coladenia
- Species: C. maeniata

Binomial name
- Coladenia maeniata Oberthür, 1896

Synonyms
- Coladenia neomaeniata Fan & Wang, 2006

= Coladenia maeniata =

Species of butterfly

Coladenia maeniata is a species of spread-winged skipper butterflies. It is found in China (north-western Yunnan and western Sichuan).
