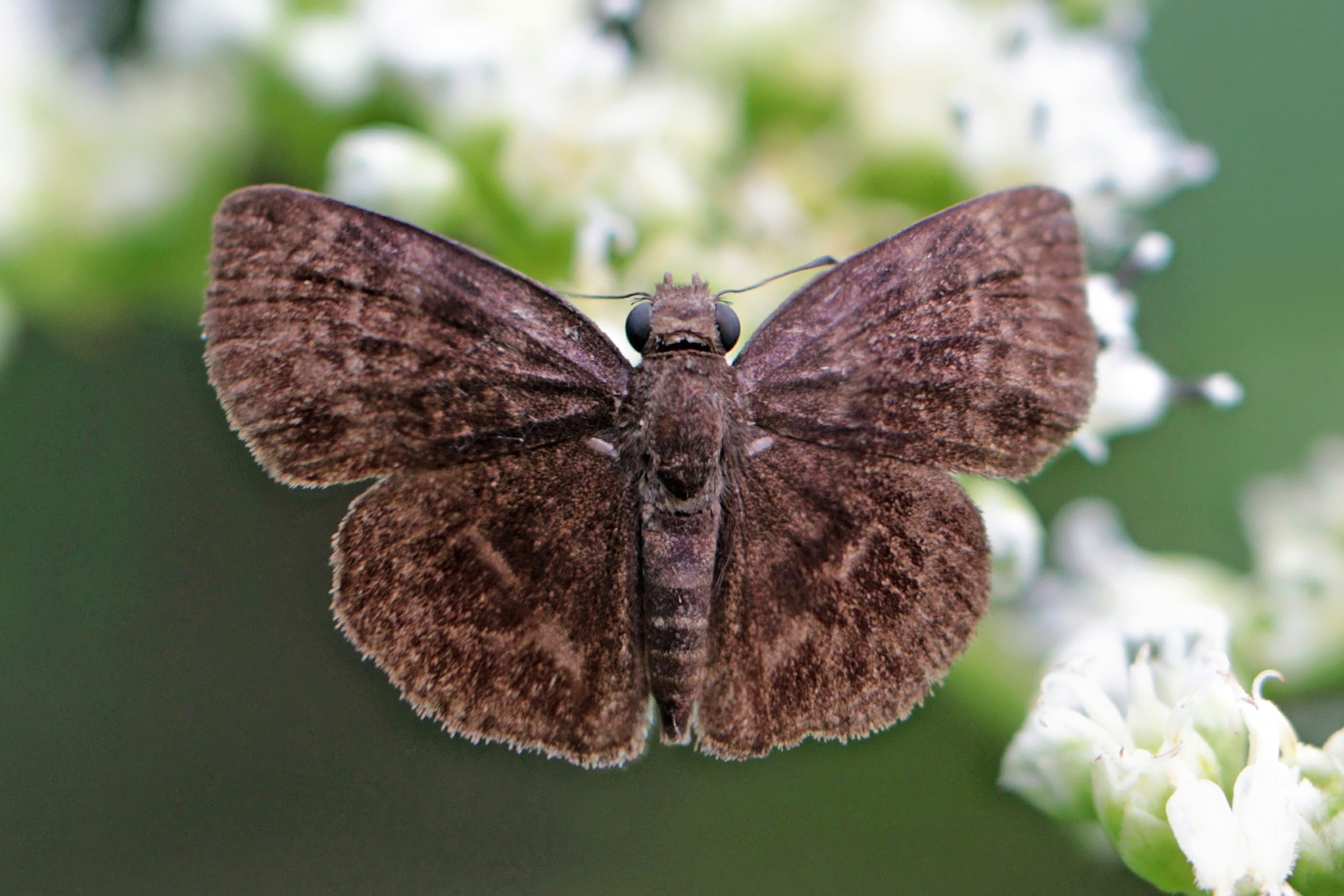
- Obscure sooty wing (B. brennus), Panama

Scientific classification
- Kingdom: Animalia
- Phylum: Arthropoda
- Class: Insecta
- Order: Lepidoptera
- Family: Hesperiidae
- Tribe: Carcharodini
- Genus: Bolla; Mabille, 1903

Species
- See text

= Bolla (butterfly) =

Genus of butterflies

Bolla is a genus of spread-winged skippers found from Mexico to South America.

== Species ==
Listed alphabetically.

- Bolla antha Evans, 1953
- Bolla atahuallpai (Lindsey, 1925) – Atahuallpa bolla
- Bolla boliviensis (Bell, 1937) – Bolivian bolla
- Bolla brennus (Godman & Salvin, [1896]) – obscure sooty wing or obscure bolla
- Bolla catharina (Bell, 1937)
- Bolla cupreiceps (Mabille, 1891) – gold-headed bolla, golden-headed bolla
- Bolla cybele Evans, 1953 – Veracruz bolla
- Bolla cyclops (Mabille, 1877) – cyclops bolla
- Bolla cylindus (Godman & Salvin, [1896]) – green bolla
- Bolla dorsolaciniae Steinhauser, 1989
- Bolla eusebius (Plötz, 1884) – spatulate sootywing, mauve bolla
- Bolla evippe (Godman & Salvin, [1896]) – Salvin's bolla
- Bolla fenestra Steinhauser, 1991 – Oaxacan bolla
- Bolla giselus (Mabille, 1883) – variable bolla
- Bolla imbras (Godman & Salvin, [1896])
- Bolla mancoi (Lindsey, 1925)
- Bolla morona (Bell, 1940)
- Bolla nigerrima Mabille & Boullet, 1917
- Bolla oiclus (Mabille, 1889) – rounded bolla
- Bolla orsines (Godman & Salvin, [1896]) – Goodman's bolla
- Bolla phylo Mabille, 1903
- Bolla saletas (Godman & Salvin, [1896]) – coppery bolla
- Bolla solitaria Steinhauser, 1991 – solitary bolla
- Bolla sonda Evans, 1953 – Evans' bolla
- Bolla subapicatus (Schaus, 1902) – pine-oak bolla
- Bolla zora Evans, 1953
- Bolla zorilla (Plötz, 1886) – shining bolla

=== Former species ===
- Bolla clytius (Godman & Salvin, [1897]) - transferred to Clytius clytius (Godman & Salvin, [1897])
- Bolla litus (Dyar, 1912) - transferred to Pholisora litus (Dyar, 1912)
