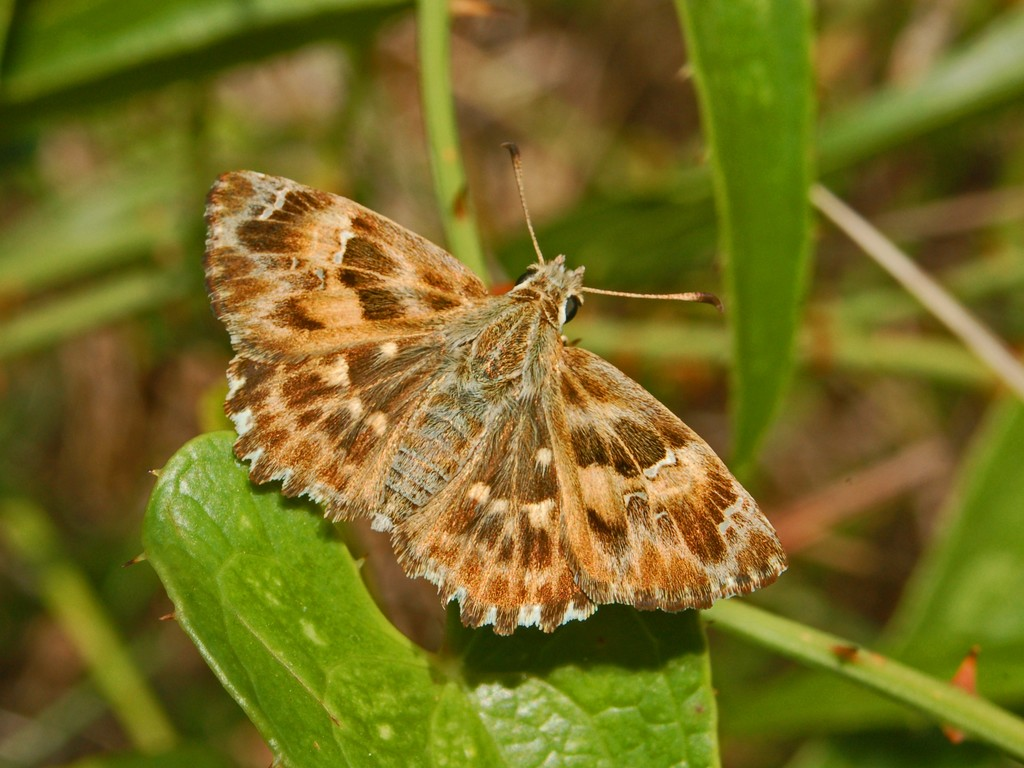
- Carcharodus alceae, mallow skipper, Italy

Scientific classification
- Kingdom: Animalia
- Phylum: Arthropoda
- Class: Insecta
- Order: Lepidoptera
- Family: Hesperiidae
- Subfamily: Pyrginae
- Tribe: Carcharodini
- Subtribe: Carcharodina
- Genus: Carcharodus; Hübner, [1819]

Synonyms
- Spilothyrus Duponchel, 1835; Reverdinus Ragusa, 1919; Lavatheria Verity, 1940

= Carcharodus =

Genus of butterflies

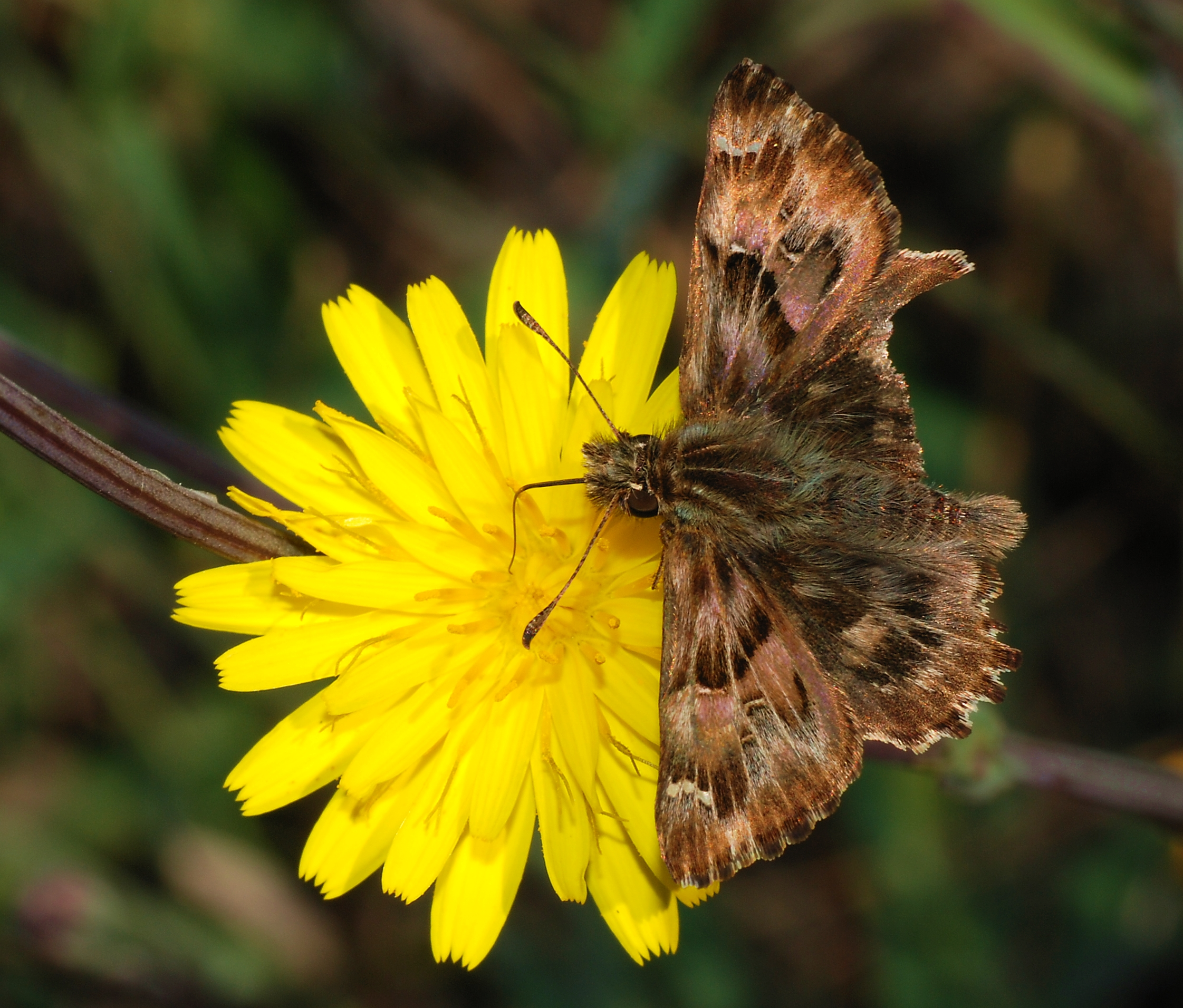
Carcharodus tripolina, false mallow skipper, Portugal

Carcharodus is a Palearctic genus of skippers in the family Hesperiidae.

In genomic research published in 2020, it was determined that six of the eight species in Carcharodus were more closely related to those in the genus Muschampia, and were transferred to that genus. This left only two species in Carcharodus.

== Description ==
This genus includes medium-sized, brown spotted skippers.

== Distribution and habitat ==
They are widespread in central and southern Europe, North Africa, and in temperate Asia from northern India to southern Siberia.

These skippers can be found in meadows, trails and other sunny, warm locations. They fly in the sunshine and often visit flowers to drink nectar. The larvae feed on various herbs of several different plant families, including Malvaceae and Lamiaceae.

== Species ==
These species belong to the genus Carcharodus:

- Carcharodus alceae (Esper, 1780) (mallow skipper)
- Carcharodus tripolina (Verity, 1925) (false mallow skipper)
