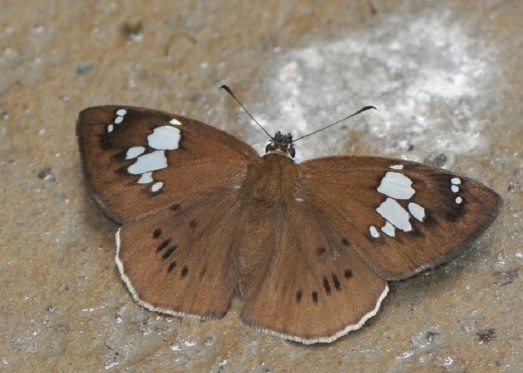
- Coladenia buchananii separafasciata

Scientific classification
- Kingdom: Animalia
- Phylum: Arthropoda
- Clade: Pancrustacea
- Class: Insecta
- Order: Lepidoptera
- Family: Hesperiidae
- Genus: Coladenia
- Species: C. buchananii

Binomial name
- Coladenia buchananii (de Nicéville, 1889)

Synonyms
- Celaenorrhinus buchananii de Nicéville, 1889

= Coladenia buchananii =

Species of butterfly

Coladenia buchananii is a species of spread-winged skipper butterflies. It is found in Myanmar, Thailand, Laos and China.

The length of the forewings is 22.5 mm for both males and females. The forewings are dark brown with white spots. The hindwings are dark brown, the basal area covered with hairs and the discal area with a series of black spots.

== Subspecies ==
- Coladenia buchananii buchananii (Myanmar, Thailand, Laos, China: north-western Yunnan)
- Coladenia buchananii separafasciata Xue, Inayoshi & Hu, 2015 (southern Jiangxi, western Fujian)

== Gallery ==
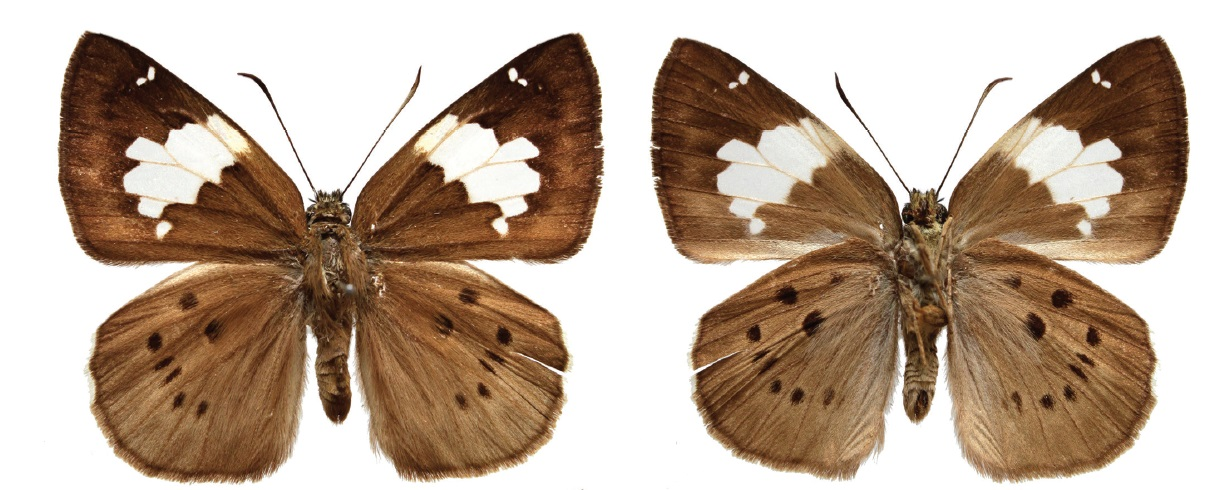
Coladenia buchananii buchananii male

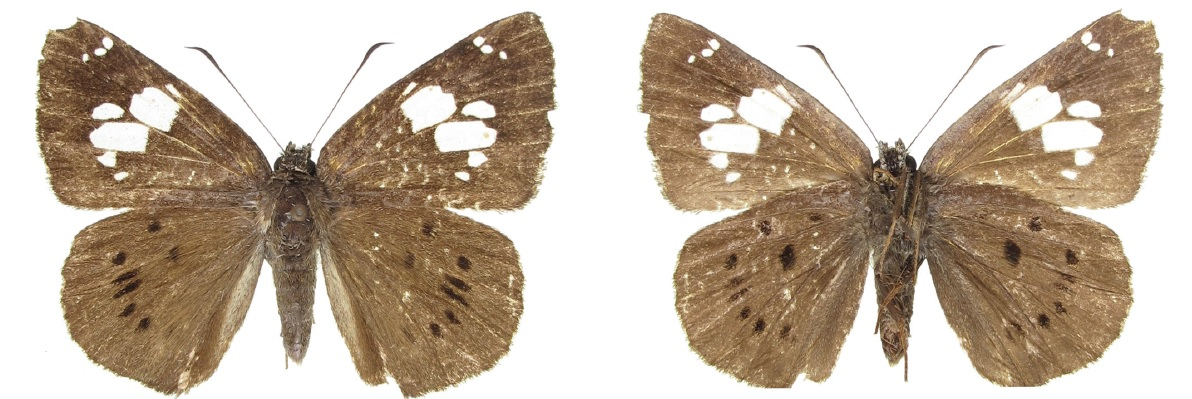
Coladenia buchananii separafasciata male

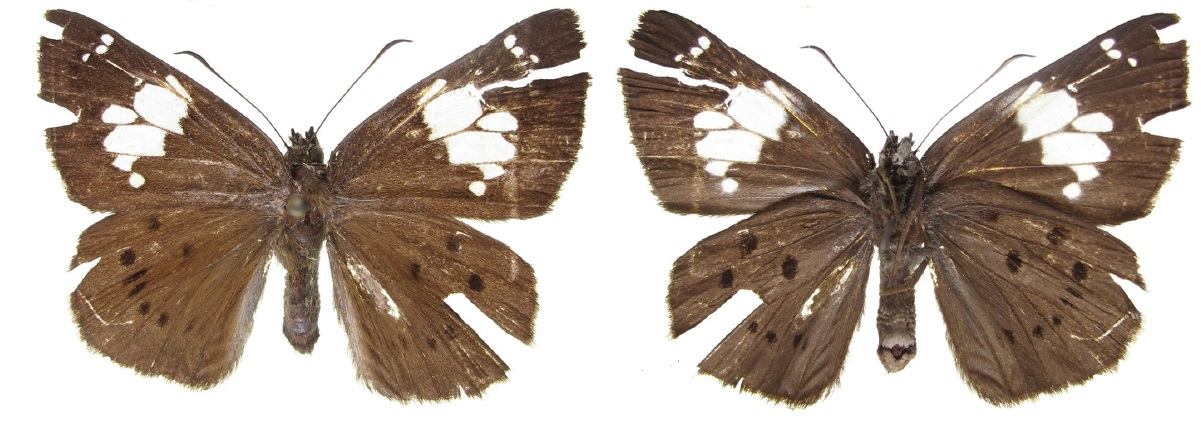
Coladenia buchananii separafasciata female
