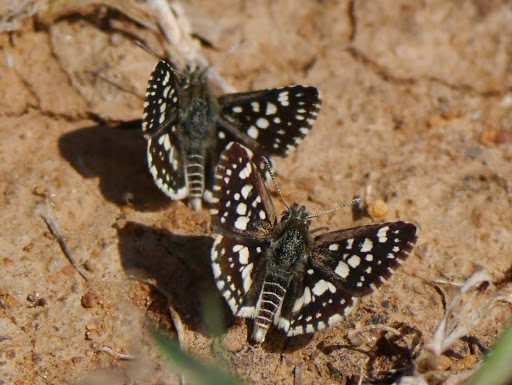
- Ernsta colotes, South Africa

Scientific classification
- Kingdom: Animalia
- Phylum: Arthropoda
- Class: Insecta
- Order: Lepidoptera
- Family: Hesperiidae
- Subfamily: Pyrginae
- Tribe: Carcharodini
- Subtribe: Carcharodina
- Genus: Ernsta; Grishin, 2020

Subgenera
- Delaga Grishin, 2020 Ernsta Grishin, 2020

= Ernsta =

Genus of butterflies

Ernsta is a genus of spread-wing skippers in the butterfly family Hesperiidae. There are about 14 described species in Ernsta, found mainly in Africa. These species were formerly members of the genus Spialia.

== Species ==
These species belong to the genus Ernsta:

- Ernsta bifida (Higgins, 1924)
- Ernsta colotes (Druce, 1875) - Bushveld Sandman
- Ernsta confusa (Higgins, 1924) - Confusing Sandman
- Ernsta delagoae (Trimen, 1898) - Delagoa Sandman
- Ernsta depauperata (Strand, 1911) - Wandering Sandman
- Ernsta dromus (Plötz, 1884) - Forest Sandman
- Ernsta mangana (Rebel, 1899) - Arabian Grizzled Skipper
- Ernsta nanus (Trimen, 1889) - Dwarf Sandman
- Ernsta paula (Higgins, 1924) - Mite Sandman
- Ernsta ploetzi (Aurivillius, 1891) - Forest Grizzled Skipper
- Ernsta sataspes (Trimen, 1864) - Boland Sandman
- Ernsta secessus (Trimen, 1891) - Wolkberg Sandman
- Ernsta wrefordi (Evans, 1951) - Wreford's Grizzled Skipper
- Ernsta zebra (Butler, 1888) - Zebra Grizzled Skipper
