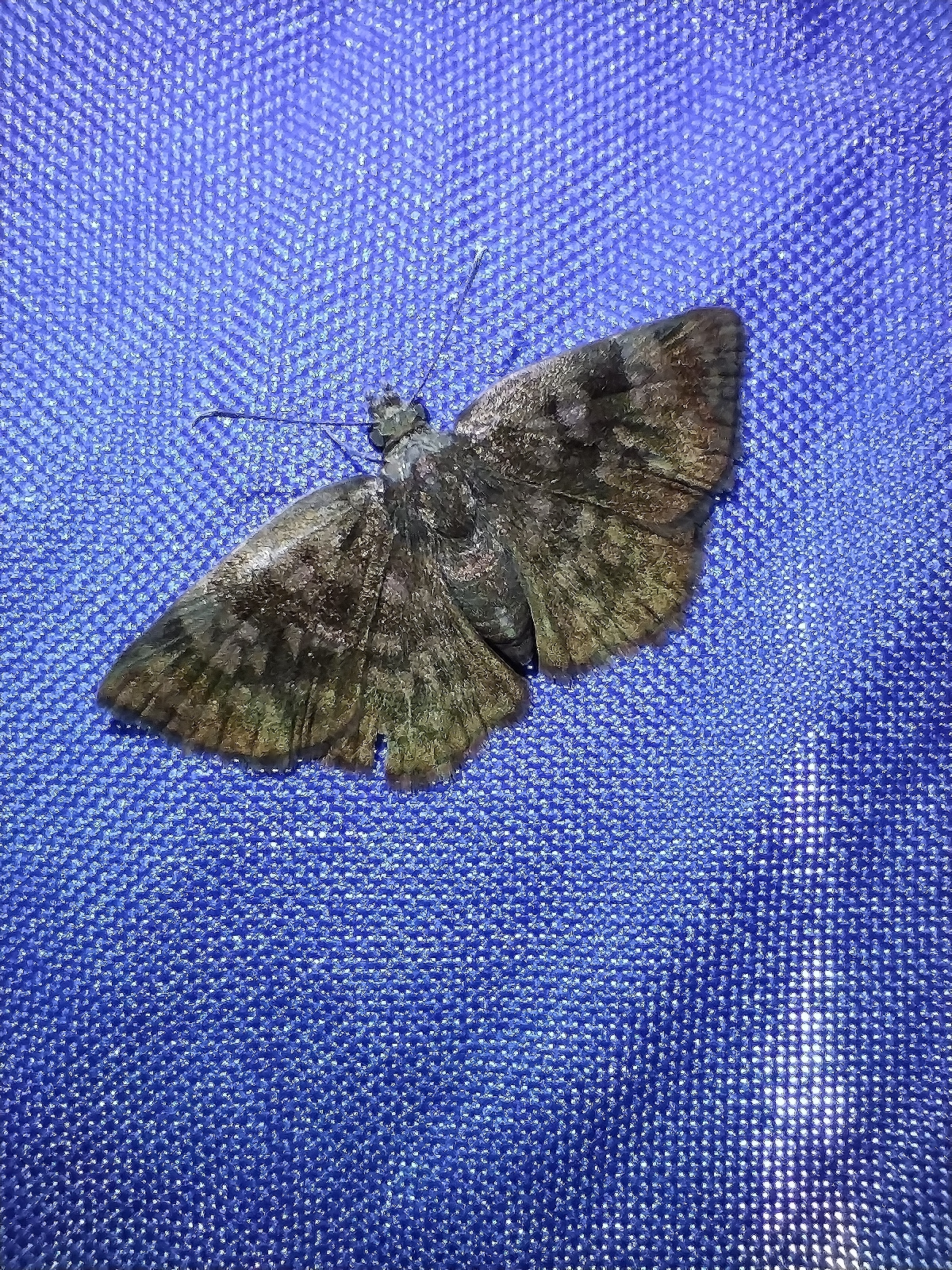
- Viola violella

Scientific classification
- Kingdom: Animalia
- Phylum: Arthropoda
- Class: Insecta
- Order: Lepidoptera
- Family: Hesperiidae
- Subfamily: Pyrginae
- Tribe: Carcharodini
- Genus: Viola; Evans, 1953

= Viola (butterfly) =

Genus of butterflies

Viola is a genus of skippers in the family Hesperiidae.
