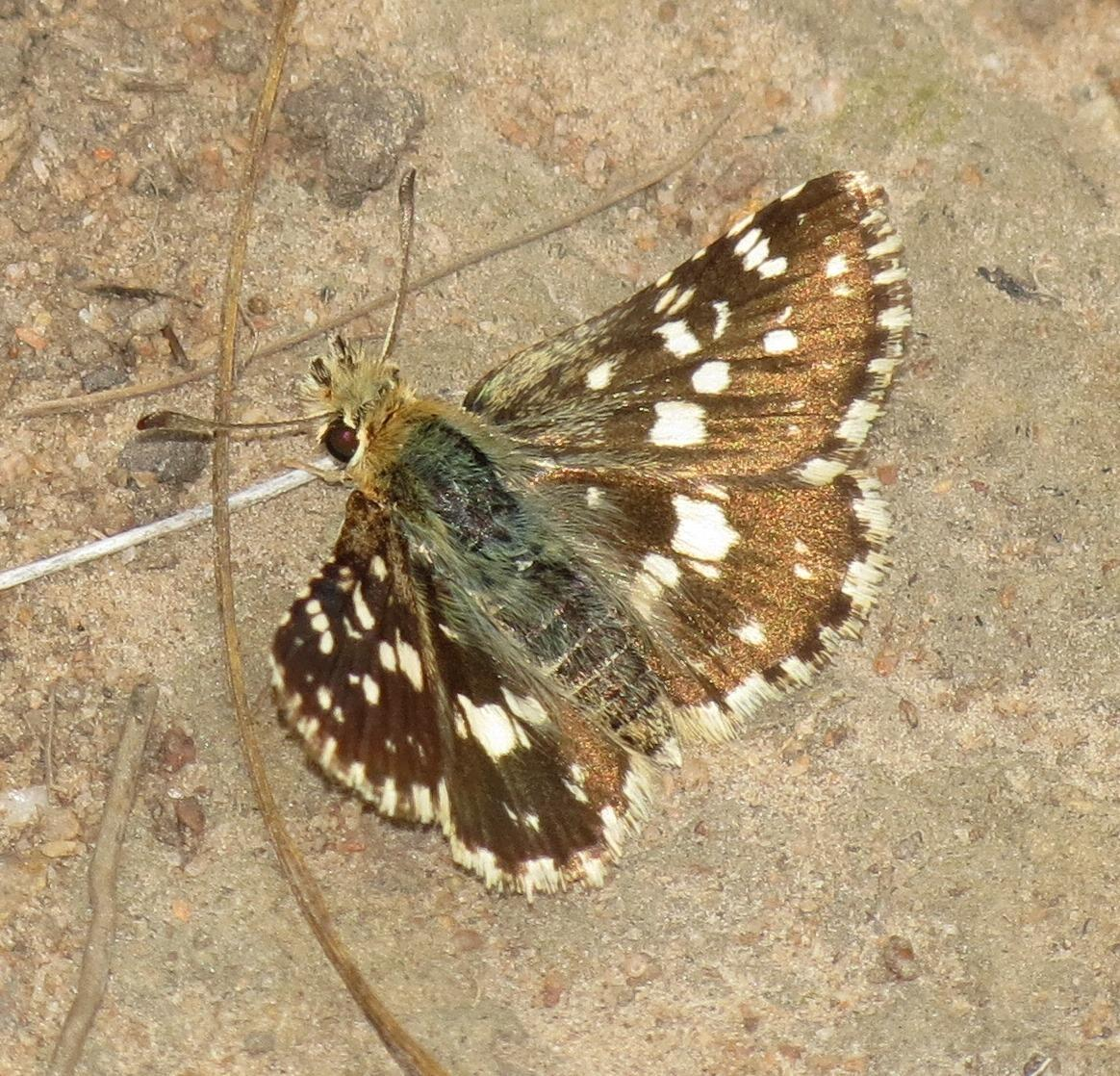
- Agyllia asterodia, South Africa

Scientific classification
- Kingdom: Animalia
- Phylum: Arthropoda
- Class: Insecta
- Order: Lepidoptera
- Family: Hesperiidae
- Subfamily: Pyrginae
- Tribe: Carcharodini
- Subtribe: Carcharodina
- Genus: Agyllia; Grishin, 2020

= Agyllia =

Genus of butterflies

Agyllia is a genus of spread-wing skippers in the butterfly family Hesperiidae, erected in 2020. There are at least three described species in Agyllia, all found in Africa. These species were formerly members of the genus Spialia.

== Species ==
These species belong to the genus Agyllia:

- Agyllia agylla (Trimen, 1889)
- Agyllia asterodia (Trimen, 1864)
- Agyllia kituina (Karsch, 1896)
