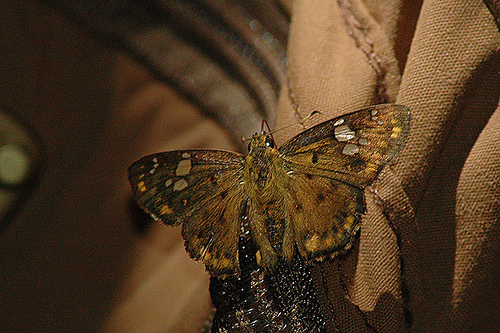
- Coladenia indrani from Kerala, India

Scientific classification
- Kingdom: Animalia
- Phylum: Arthropoda
- Class: Insecta
- Order: Lepidoptera
- Family: Hesperiidae
- Tribe: Tagiadini
- Genus: Coladenia; Moore, 1881

= Coladenia =

Genus of butterflies

Coladenia is an Oriental genus of spread-winged skippers in the family Hesperiidae. They are found throughout most of Southern, Southeastern, and Eastern Asia.

== Species ==
The genus contains the following fifteen species:

- Coladenia agni (de Nicéville, [1884])

- Coladenia agni agni (de Nicéville, [1884]) - found in Sikkim, Burma, Thailand, and Hainan
- Coladenia agni sundae de Jong & Treadaway, 1992 - found in Sumatra

- Coladenia agnioides Elwes & Edwards, 1897 - found in Assam, Nepal, Burma, Laos, Langkawi, the Malay Peninsula, and possibly southern China
- Coladenia buchananii (de Nicéville, 1889)
- Coladenia hoenei Evans, 1939 - found in northern Thailand
- Coladenia igna (Semper, 1892)

- Coladenia igna igna (Semper, 1892) - found in the Philippines, Borneo, Sumatra, Java, Bali, Taiwan, and the Malay Peninsula
- Coladenia igna marinda de Jong & Treadaway, 1992 - found in Marinduque, Philippines

- Coladenia indrani (Moore, [1866]) - found in southern India to Bengal, Mussoorie to Sikkim, and Burma

- Coladenia indrani tissa Moore, [1881] - found in Sri Lanka
- Coladenia indrani uposatha Fruhstorfer, 1910 - found in Burma, Thailand, and Laos

- Coladenia kehelatha (Hewitson, 1878) - found in Sulawesi and the Sula Islands of Indonesia
- Coladenia laxmi (de Nicéville, [1889])

- Coladenia laxmi laxmi - found in Burma and northern Thailand
- Coladenia laxmi sobrina Elwes & Edwards, 1897 - found in southern Burma, Thailand, Laos, the Malay Peninsula, Sumatra, Tioman, Sumatra, and Hainan

- Coladenia maeniata Oberthür, 1896 - found in Yunnan, China
- Coladenia minor Chiba, 1991 - endemic to the Philippines
- Coladenia nankoshana (Shimonoya & Murayama, 1976) - found in Taiwan
- Coladenia ochracea de Jong & Treadaway, 1992 - endemic to the Philippines
- Coladenia palawana (Staudinger, 1889) - found in Sumatra, Bali, Borneo, and Palawan. Possibly also to the rest of the Philippines but probably misidentification with C. similis
- Coladenia semperi Elwes & Edwards, 1897 - endemic to the Philippines
- Coladenia sheila Evans, 1939 - found in China
- Coladenia similis de Jong & Treadaway, 1992 - endemic to the Philippines
- Coladenia tanya Devyatkin, 2002 - found in central Vietnam
- Coladenia uemurai Huang, 2003 - found in Yunnan
- Coladenia vitrea (Leech, 1894) - found in China: Sichuan, Shaanxi

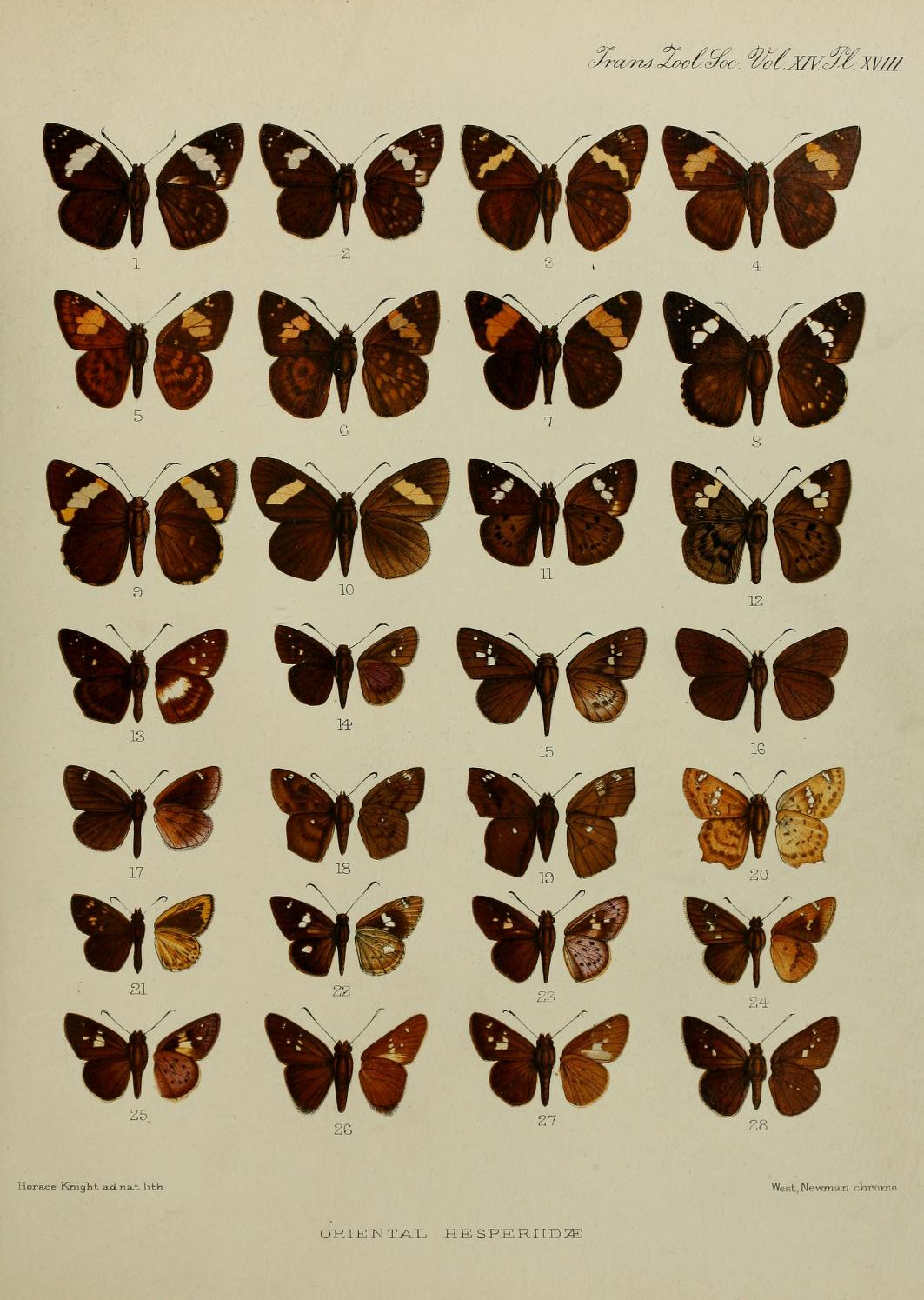
Coladenia dan fulvescens Elwes & Edwards, 1897, Coladenia agnioides Elwes & Edwards, 1897 and Coladenia laxmi sobrina in Elwes & Edwards, 1897 A Revision of the Oriental Hesperiidae

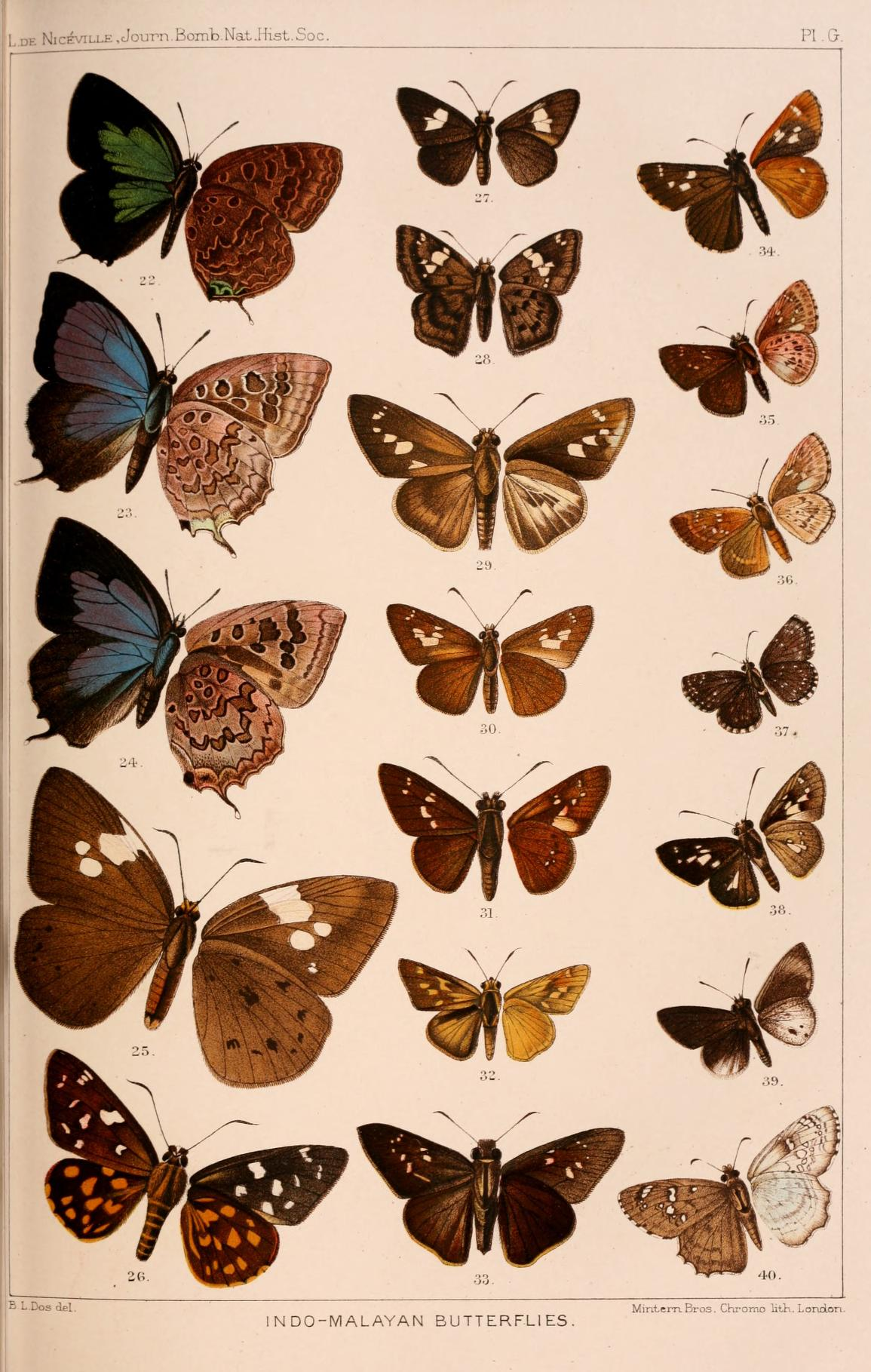
Coladenia laxmi (de Nicéville, [1889]) in Lionel de Nicéville, 1891 On new and little-known butterflies from the Indo-Malayan region

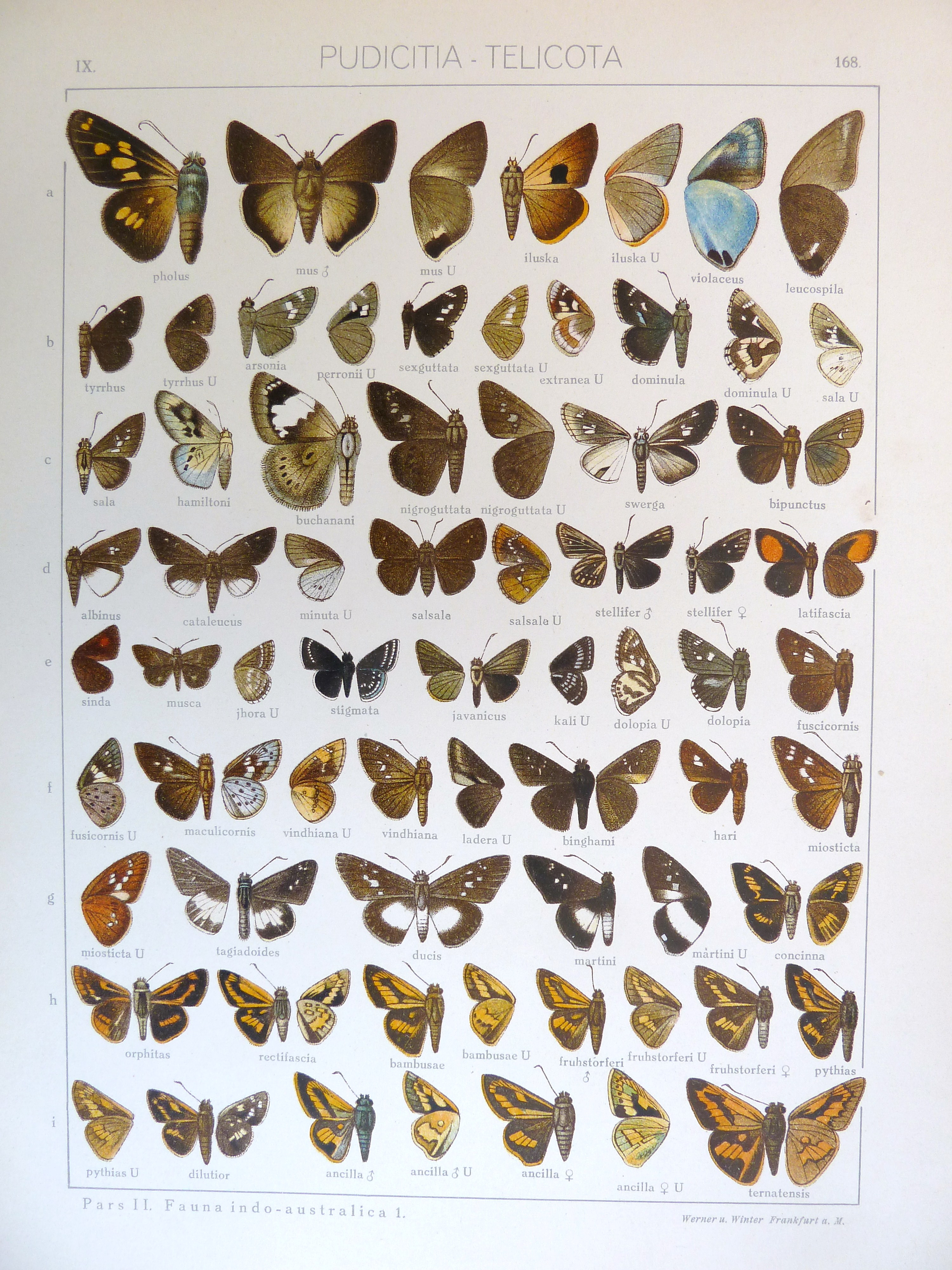
Coladenia buchananii in Seitz
