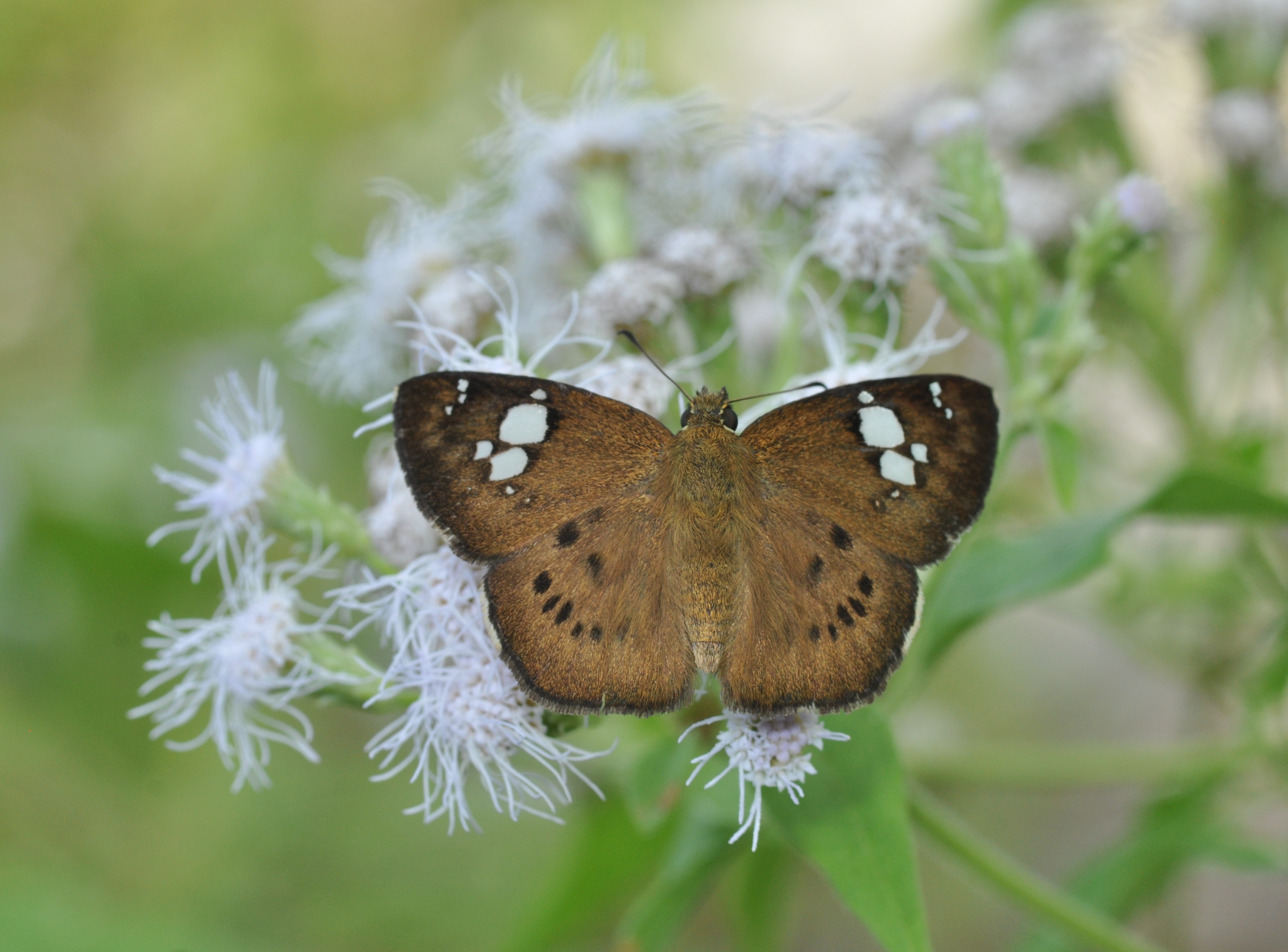

Scientific classification
- Kingdom: Animalia
- Phylum: Arthropoda
- Class: Insecta
- Order: Lepidoptera
- Family: Hesperiidae
- Genus: Coladenia
- Species: C. agni

Binomial name
- Coladenia agni (de Niceville, 1884)

Synonyms
- Plesioneura agni de Nicéville, [1884]

= Coladenia agni =

Species of butterfly

Coladenia agni is a species of spread-winged skipper butterflies. It is commonly found in Myanmar, Thailand, Laos and the Indian state of Sikkim.

== Subspecies ==
- Coladenia agni agni (Sikkim to Burma, Thailand, Laos and China: Hainan)
- Coladenia agni sundae de Jong & Treadaway, 1992 (Sumatra)
