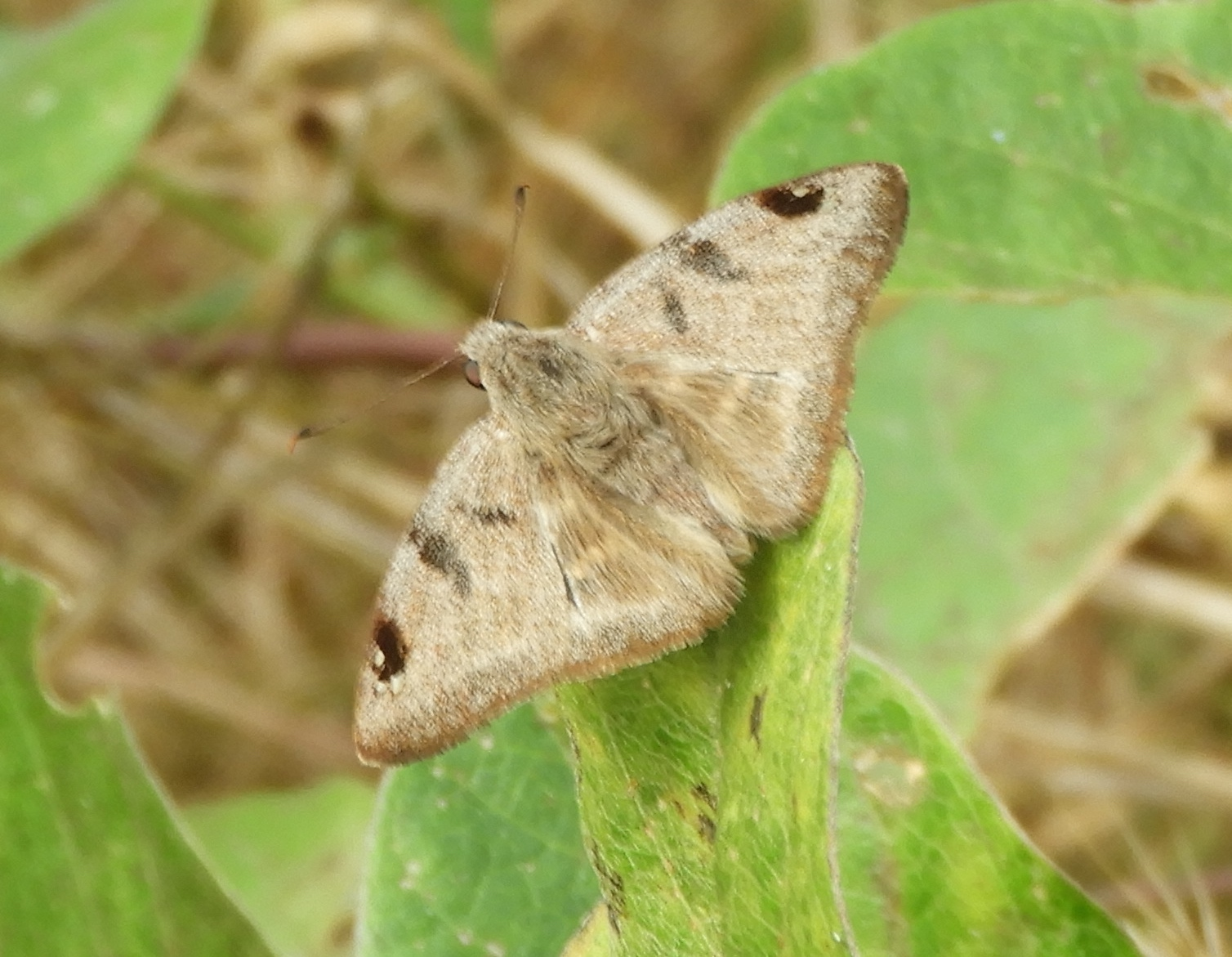
- Arteurotia tractipennis

Scientific classification
- Kingdom: Animalia
- Phylum: Arthropoda
- Class: Insecta
- Order: Lepidoptera
- Family: Hesperiidae
- Tribe: Carcharodini
- Genus: Arteurotia; Butler & H. Druce, 1872

= Arteurotia =

Genus of butterflies

Arteurotia is a genus of skipper butterflies genus in the family Hesperiidae.

== Species ==
Two species are recognised in the genus Arteurotia:

- Arteurotia celendris Hewitson, 1878
- Arteurotia tractipennis Butler & Druce, 1872 - starred skipper - Mexico, Costa Rica and Panama
