= Myrinia =

Scientific classification
- Kingdom: Animalia
- Phylum: Arthropoda
- Clade: Pancrustacea
- Class: Insecta
- Order: Lepidoptera
- Family: Hesperiidae
- Tribe: Carcharodini
- Genus: Myrinia; Evans, 1953

Genus of butterflies

Myrinia is a genus of skippers in the family Hesperiidae. They occur in the Americas, from Mexico to southern Brazil.

== Species ==
There are six recognized species:

- Myrinia binoculus (Möschler, 1876)
- Myrinia catua Mielke, 1968
- Myrinia laddeyi (Bell, 1942)
- Myrinia myris (Mabille, 1897)
- Myrinia raymundo Freeman, 1979
- Myrinia santa Evans, 1953
