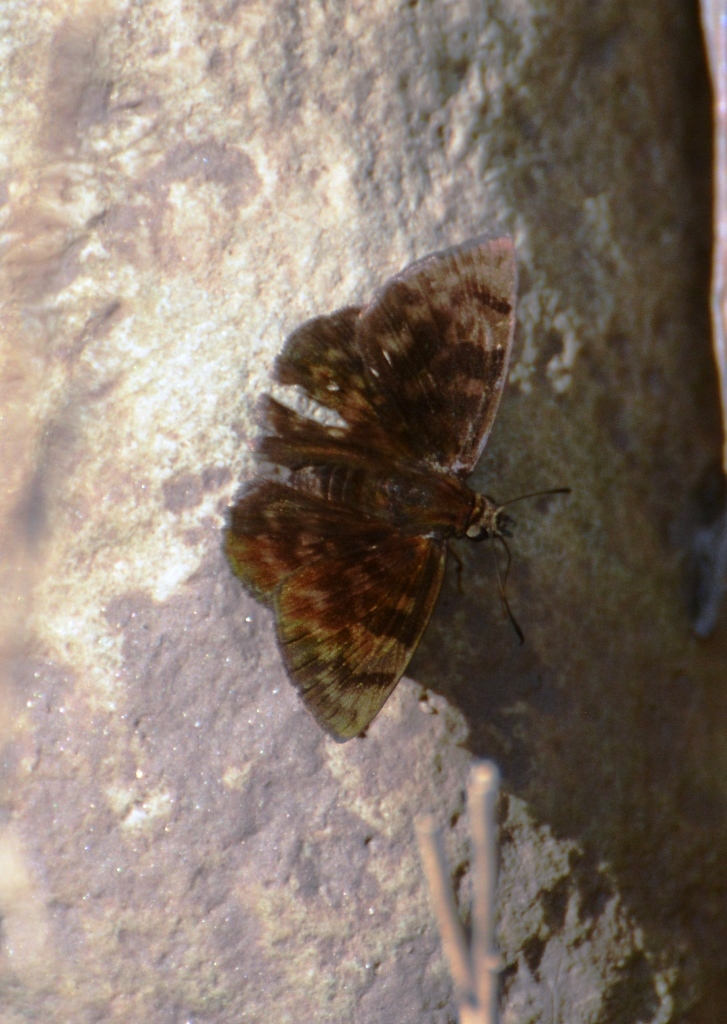
- Pachyneuria licisca

Scientific classification
- Kingdom: Animalia
- Phylum: Arthropoda
- Class: Insecta
- Order: Lepidoptera
- Family: Hesperiidae
- Tribe: Carcharodini
- Genus: Pachyneuria; Mabille, 1888

Species
- See text

= Pachyneuria =

Genus of butterflies

Pachyneuria is a genus of skippers in the family Hesperiidae found from Mexico to South America.

== Species ==
Listed alphabetically

- Pachyneuria damon (Bell, 1937)
- Pachyneuria duidae (Bell, 1932)
- Pachyneuria helena (Hayward, 1939)
- Pachyneuria inops (Mabille, 1877)
- Pachyneuria jaguar Evans, 1953
- Pachyneuria lineatopunctata (Mabille & Boullet, 1917)
- Pachyneuria milleri Steinhauser, 1989
- Pachyneuria obscura Mabille, 1888
