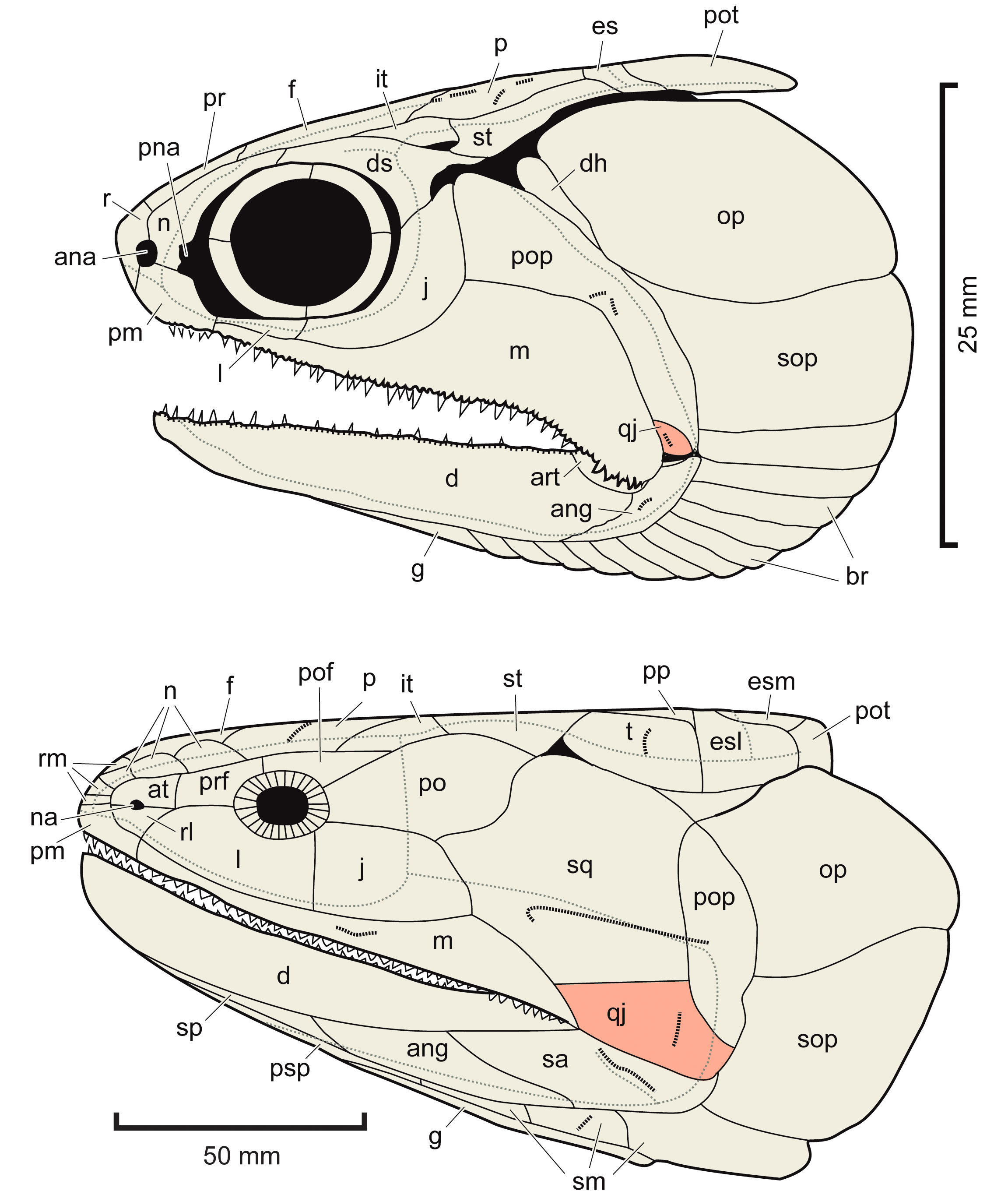
- Mimipiscis and Eusthenopteron skulls, quadratojugal highlighted

Scientific classification
- Domain: Eukaryota
- Kingdom: Animalia
- Phylum: Chordata
- Class: Actinopterygii
- Genus: †Mimipiscis; Choo, 2011

Type species
- †Mimipiscis toombsi (Gardiner & Bartram, 1977)

Other species
- †M. toombsi (Gardiner & Bartram, 1977); †M. bartrami Choo, 2011

Synonyms
- Mimia Gardiner & Bartram, 1977

= Mimipiscis =

Mimipiscis Temporal range: early Frasnian, Late Devonian, 385–380 Ma

Extinct genus of ray-finned fishes

Mimipiscis is a fossil genus of very primitive ray-finned fishes from the Upper Devonian Gneuda and Gogo formations of Western Australia.

The genus was initially described by Gardiner & Bartram as Mimia in 1977, a junior homonym of the skipper butterfly genus Mimia, which was already established by Evans in 1953. The name Mimipiscis derives from the Mimi dreamtime beings of Arnhem Land aboriginal folklore, and the Latin piscis, meaning fish.
