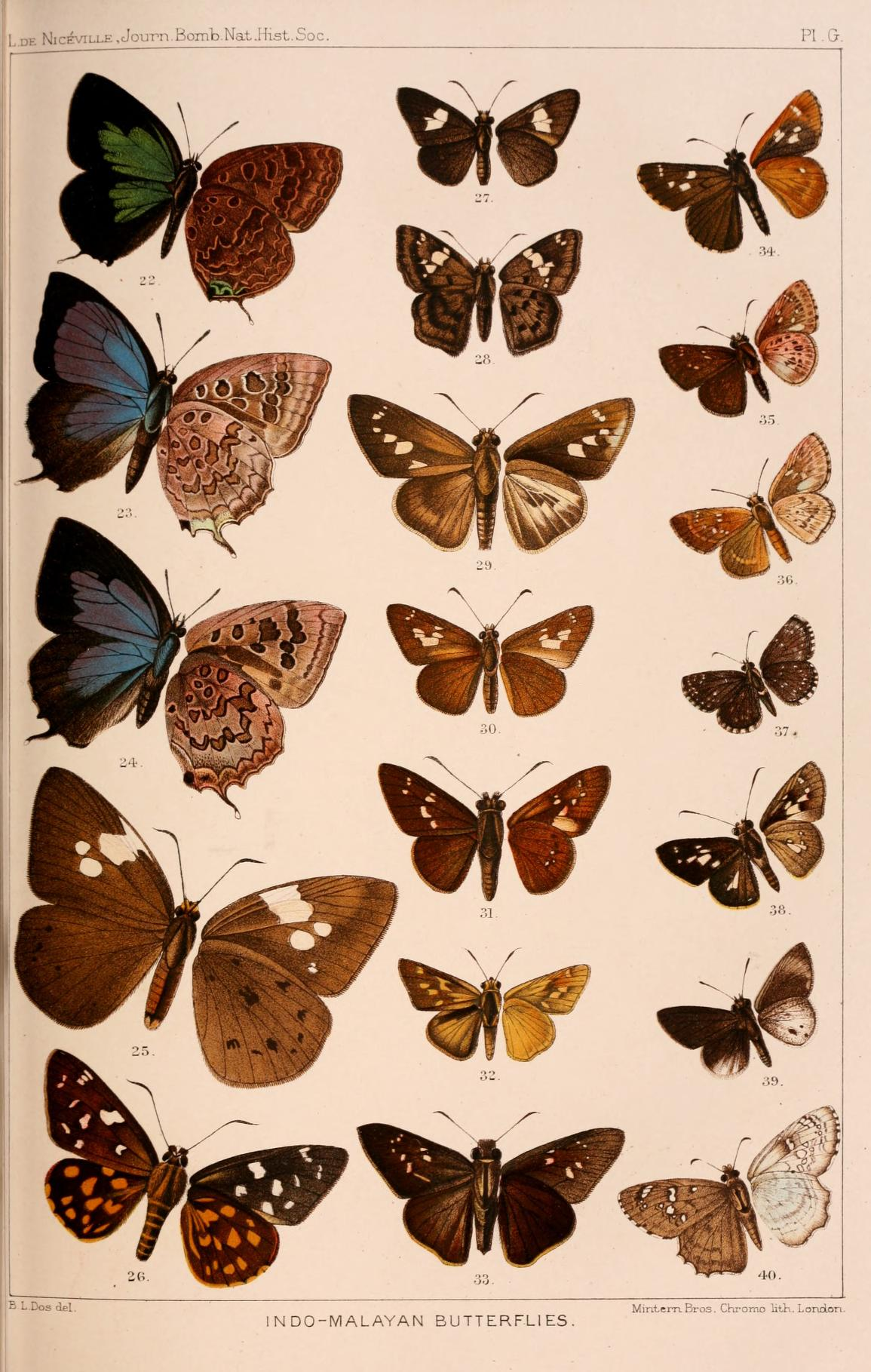
- Figure 28 in Lionel de Nicéville's 1891 "On New and Little-Known Butterflies from the Indo-Malayan Region"

Scientific classification
- Kingdom: Animalia
- Phylum: Arthropoda
- Class: Insecta
- Order: Lepidoptera
- Family: Hesperiidae
- Genus: Coladenia
- Species: C. laxmi

Binomial name
- Coladenia laxmi (de Nicéville, [1889])

Synonyms
- Plesioneura laxmi de Nicéville, [1889]; Coladenia sobrina Elwes & Edwards, 1897

= Coladenia laxmi =

Species of butterfly

Coladenia laxmi is a butterfly in the family Hesperiidae. It was described by Lionel de Nicéville in 1889. It is found in the Indomalayan realm.

== Subspecies ==
- C. l. laxmi (Burma, Thailand)
- C. l. sobrina Elwes & Edwards, 1897 (southern Burma, Thailand, Laos, Peninsular Malaysia, Tioman, Sumatra, Hainan)
