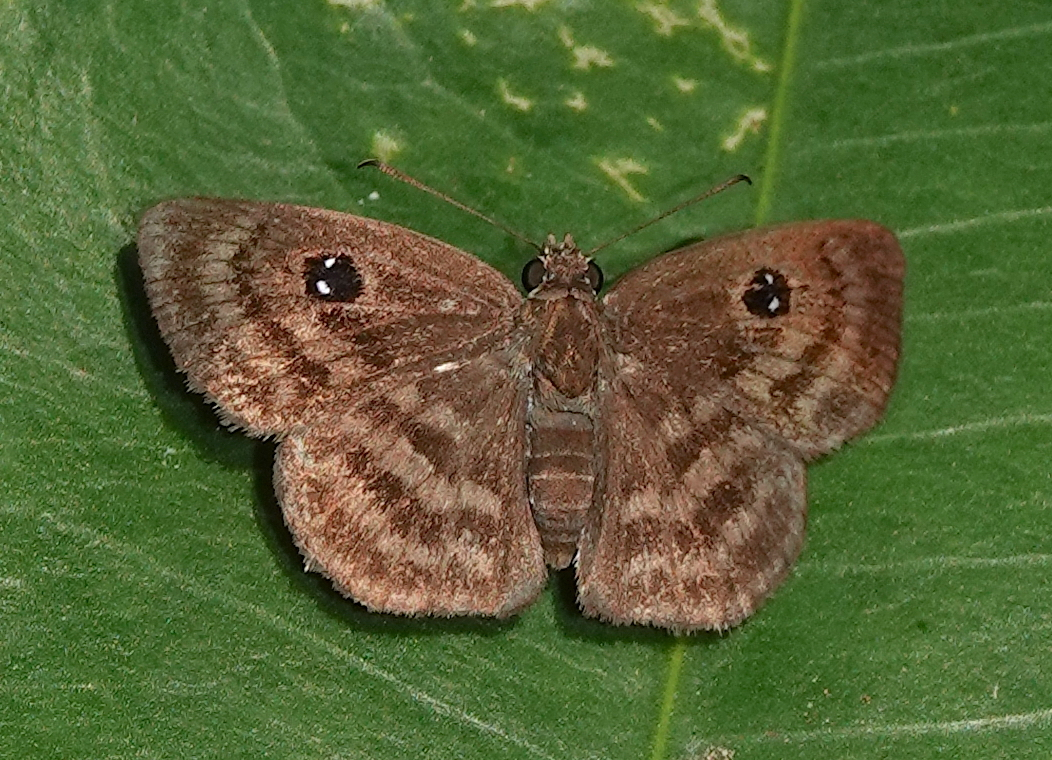
- Cyclosemia anastomosis

Scientific classification
- Kingdom: Animalia
- Phylum: Arthropoda
- Class: Insecta
- Order: Lepidoptera
- Family: Hesperiidae
- Tribe: Carcharodini
- Genus: Cyclosemia; Mabille, 1878

= Cyclosemia =

Genus of butterflies

Cyclosemia is a genus of skippers in the family Hesperiidae.

== Species ==
Recognised species in the genus Cyclosemia include:

- Cyclosemia herennius (Stoll, 1782)
