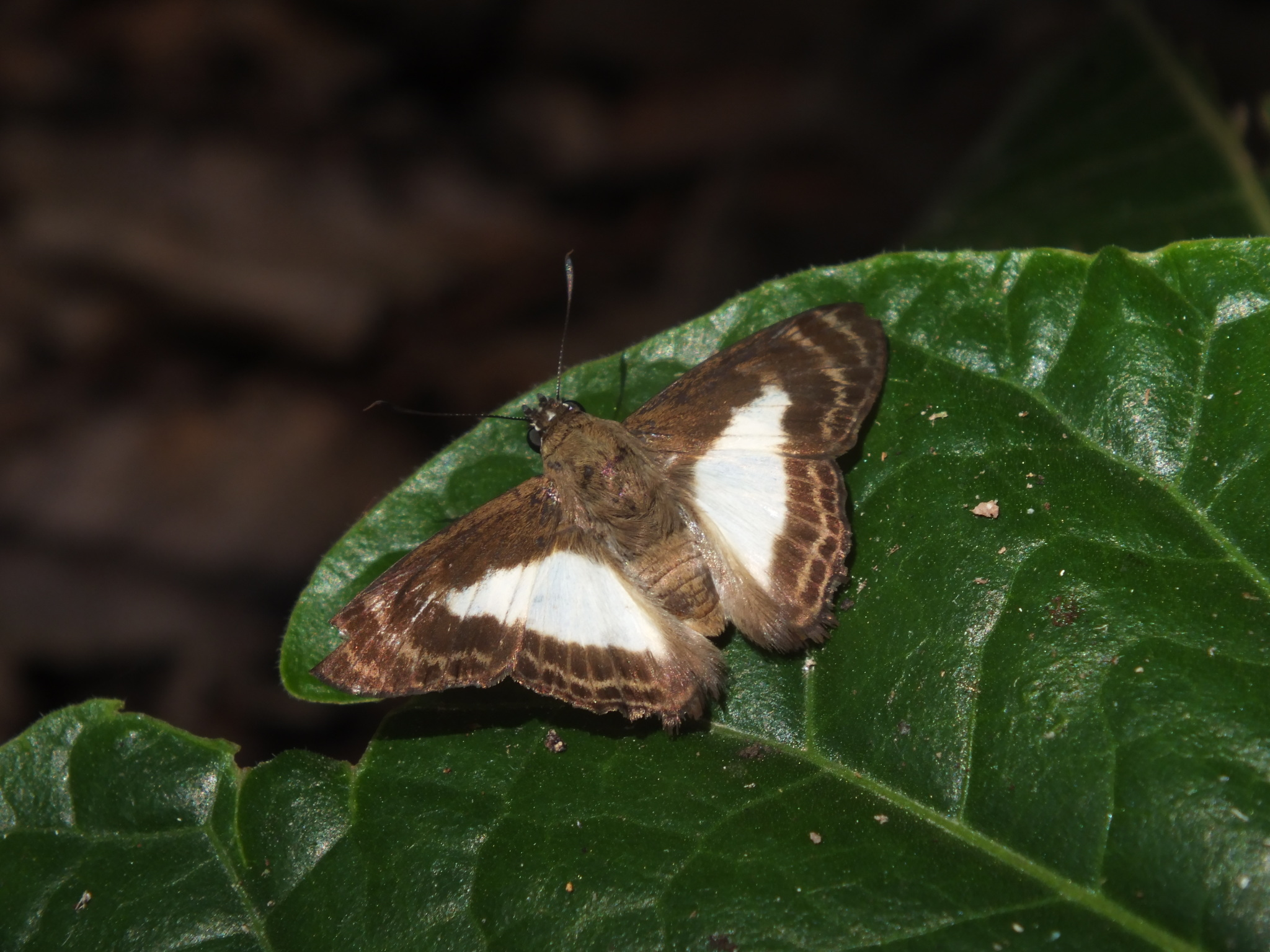
- Sophista aristoteles

Scientific classification
- Kingdom: Animalia
- Phylum: Arthropoda
- Class: Insecta
- Order: Lepidoptera
- Family: Hesperiidae
- Tribe: Carcharodini
- Genus: Sophista; Plötz, 1879

= Sophista =

Genus of butterflies

Sophista is a genus of skippers in the family Hesperiidae.
