= Xispia =

Scientific classification
- Kingdom: Animalia
- Phylum: Arthropoda
- Class: Insecta
- Order: Lepidoptera
- Family: Hesperiidae
- Tribe: Carcharodini
- Genus: Xispia; Lindsey, 1925

Genus of butterflies

Xispia is a genus of skippers in the family Hesperiidae.
