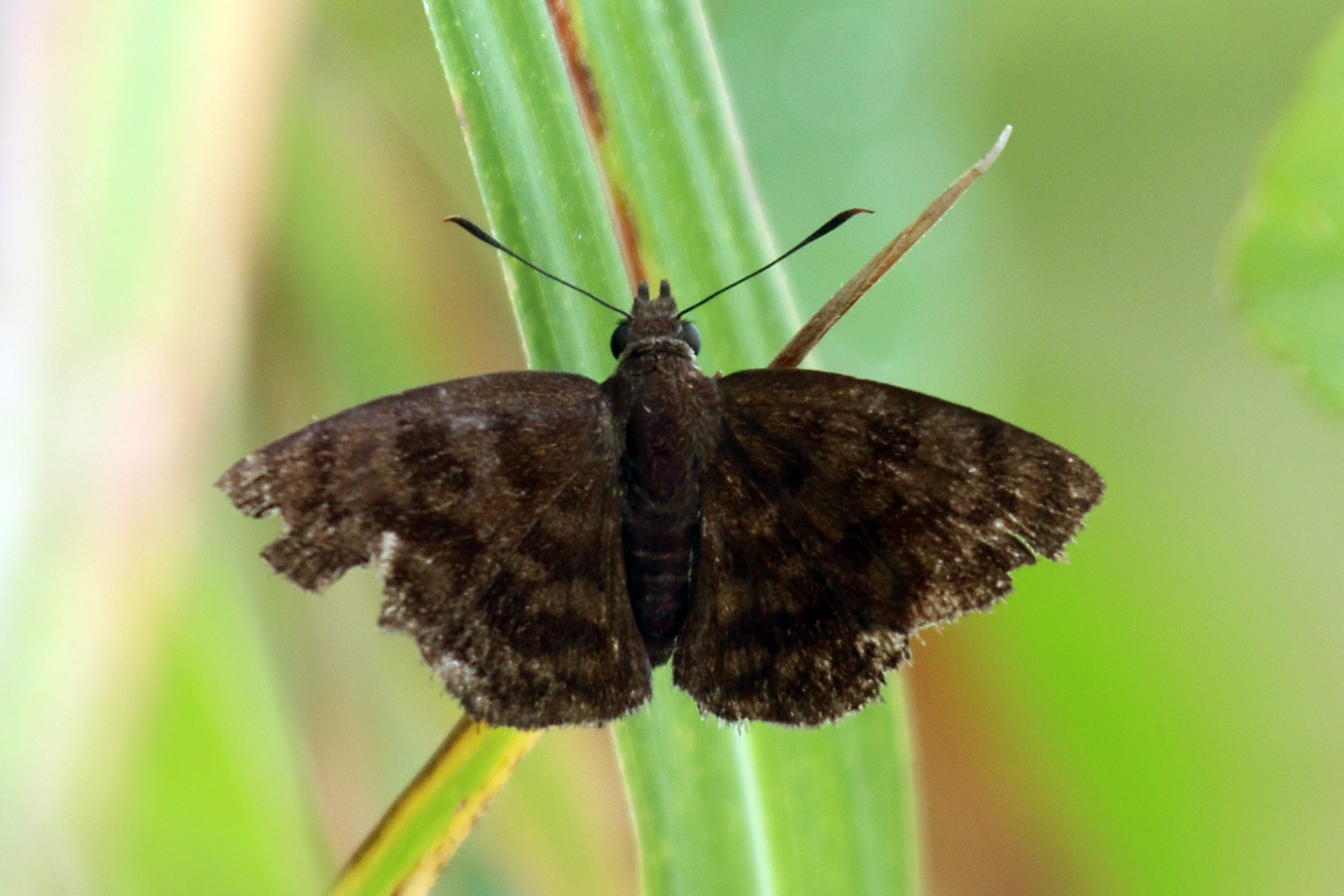
- Morning glory tufted-skipper (P. dimidiata), Tobago

Scientific classification
- Kingdom: Animalia
- Phylum: Arthropoda
- Class: Insecta
- Order: Lepidoptera
- Family: Hesperiidae
- Tribe: Carcharodini
- Genus: Pellicia; Herrich-Schäffer, 1870

= Pellicia =

Genus of butterflies

Pellicia is a genus of skippers in the family Hesperiidae.

== Species ==
- Pellicia angra Evans, 1953
- Pellicia arina Evans, 1953
- Pellicia costimacula Herrich-Schäffer, 1870
- Pellicia demetrius (Plötz, 1882)
- Pellicia dimidiata Herrich-Schäffer, 1870
- Pellicia hersilia Hayward, [1940]
- Pellicia klugi Williams & Bell, 1939
- Pellicia najoides Hayward, 1933
- Pellicia ranta Evans, 1953
- Pellicia santana Williams & Bell, 1939
- Pellicia simulator Williams & Bell, 1939
- Pellicia theon Plötz, 1882
- Pellicia tonga Evans, 1953
- Pellicia trax Evans, 1953
- Pellicia tyana Plötz, 1882
- Pellicia vecina Schaus, 1902
