= Quadratojugal bone =

The quadratojugal is a skull bone present in many vertebrates, including some living reptiles and amphibians.

== Anatomy and function ==
In animals with a quadratojugal bone, it is typically found connected to the jugal (cheek) bone from the front and the squamosal bone from above. It is usually positioned at the rear lower corner of the cranium. Many modern tetrapods lack a quadratojugal bone as it has been lost or fused to other bones. Modern examples of tetrapods without a quadratojugal include salamanders, mammals, birds, and squamates (lizards and snakes). In tetrapods with a quadratojugal bone, it often forms a portion of the jaw joint.

Developmentally, the quadratojugal bone is a dermal bone in the temporal series, forming the original braincase. The squamosal and quadratojugal bones together form the cheek region and may provide muscular attachments for facial muscles.

=== In reptiles and amphibians ===
Skull diagram of the rhynchocephalian Sphenotitan, with the quadratojugal coloured lilac

In most modern reptiles and amphibians, the quadratojugal is a prominent, straplike bone in the skull and provides structural integrity in the postorbital region of the skull. In many reptiles, the inner face of the quadratojugal also connects to the quadrate bone which forms the cranium's contribution to the jaw joint. Early in their evolution, diapsid reptiles evolved a lower temporal bar which was composed of the quadratojugal and jugal. The lower temporal bar forms the lower border of the infratemporal fenestra, one of two holes in the side of the head and a hallmark of a diapsidan skull. However, many diapsids, including modern squamates (lizards and snakes), have lost the lower temporal bar. Crocodilians and rhynchocephalians (the latter represented solely by the tuatara, Sphenodon) retain a quadratojugal. Turtles also seem to possess a quadratojugal. Among living amphibians, a quadratojugal is known to be present in some frogs and caecilians. However, it is notably absent in salamanders.

=== In birds ===
In modern birds, the quadratojugal bone is a thin and rodlike element of the skull. Upon ossification, the jugal and quadratojugal bones fuse to form the jugal bar, which is homologous to the lower temporal bar of other diapsids. The sections of the jugal bar derived from the jugal and quadratojugal articulate with the postorbital and squamosal bones, respectively. This facilitates cranial kinesis, by allowing the quadrate bone to rotate during opening of the upper jaw.

=== In mammals ===
Advanced cynodonts, including the mammaliaforms, have lost the quadratojugal, with the diminutive quadrate connecting to the stapes to function as a hearing structure. In modern mammals, the quadrate bone evolves to become the incus, one of the ossicles of the middle ear. This is an apomorphy of the mammalian clade, and is used to identify the fossil transition to mammals.

== Evolution ==
=== Origin ===
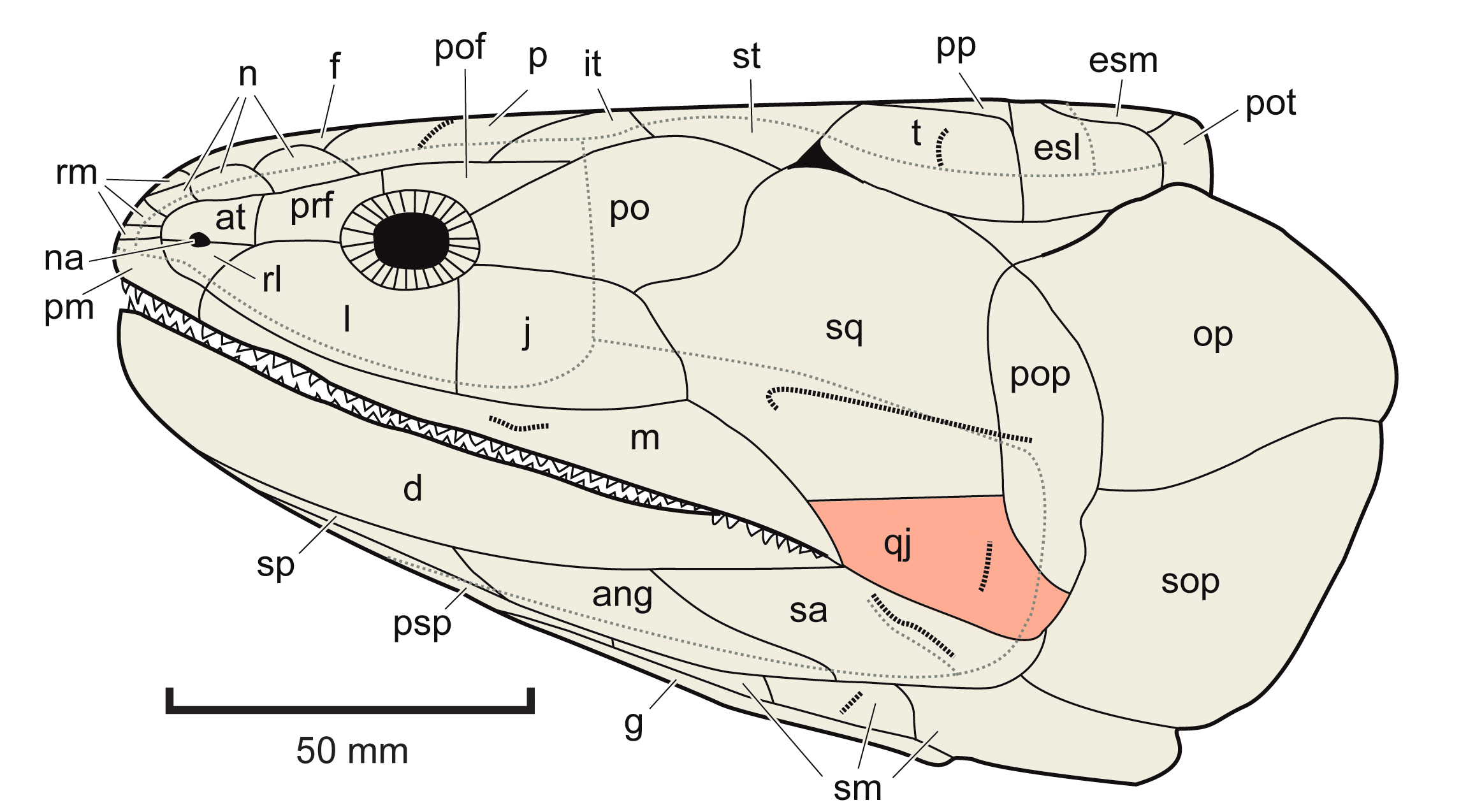
The skull of the tetrapodomorph fish Eusthenopteron, with the quadratojugal bone labelled in pink.

The quadratojugal likely originated within the clade Sarcopterygii, which includes tetrapods and lobe-finned fish. Although a tiny bone similar in position to the quadratojugal has been observed in the placoderm Entelognathus and some early actinopterygiians (Mimipiscis, Cheirolepis), it is unclear whether this bone was homologous to the quadratojugal. A quadratojugal is absent in actinians (coelacanths) and onychodonts, but it was clearly present in Porolepiformes, distant relatives of modern dipnoans (lungfish). Many paleontologists argue that the quadratojugal was formed by a division of the preoperculum, although a few believe that it was present before the preoperculum formed. All tetrapodomorph fish had a quadratojugal, retained by their tetrapod descendants. Elpistostegalians such as Panderichthys, Tiktaalik, and other very tetrapod-like fish were the first vertebrates to have contact between the quadratojugal and jugal. Before the elpistostegalians, the jugal was small and isolated from the quadratojugal by the squamosal and maxilla.

Amphibians (in the broad sense) typically had long, roughly rectangular quadratojugals that contacted the maxilla, jugal, squamosal, and quadrate. In several lineages, most of them traditionally considered "Reptiliomorpha", the jugal expands downwards to reduce the amount of contact between the quadratojugal and maxilla. This is exemplified in reptiles, which have completely lost the contact. Most urodelans (salamanders) lack quadratojugals, except the Miocene genus Chelotriton. A quadratojugal is also missing in the caecilian-like Triassic stereospondyl Chinlestegophis as well as the lysorophians, a group of long-bodied Paleozoic microsaurs. Many other microsaurs had heavily reduced quadratojugals.

=== Synapsids ===
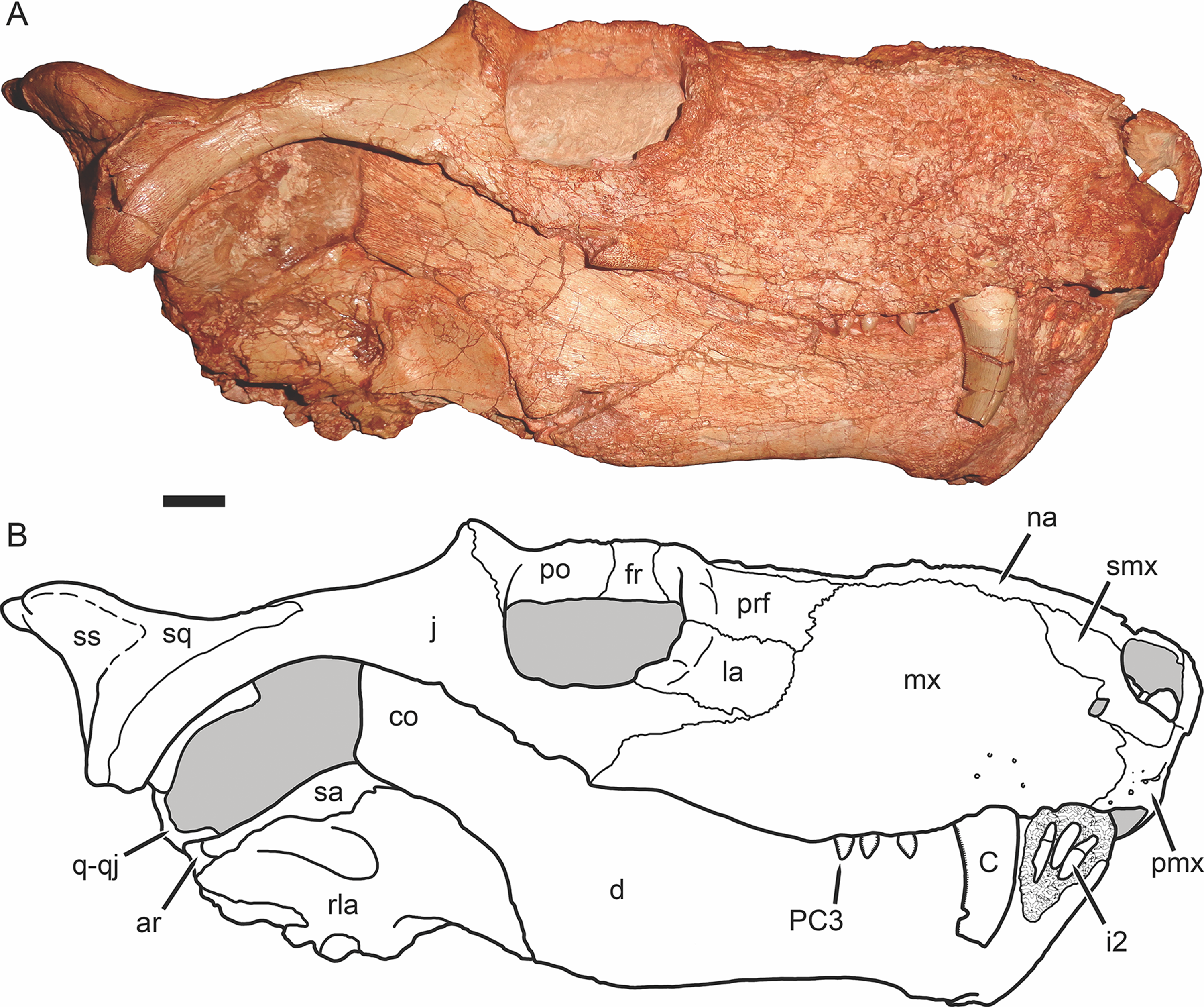
The skull of Gorynychus, a therocephalian synapsid. The tiny quadrate-quadratojugal complex is labelled with q-qj.

In synapsids (mammals and their extinct relatives), the quadratojugal undergoes significant transformation during the evolution of the group. Early synapsids such as eothyridids and caseids retained long quadratojugals and in some cases even reacquire quadratojugal-maxilla contact. In most therapsids, including gorgonopsians, therocephalians, and dicynodonts, the quadratojugal is tiny, having lost its contact with the jugal. It usually fuses with the equally small quadrate to form the quadrate-quadratojugal complex. Oddly enough, the cynodont Thrinaxodon retains a separate quadratojugal. In other cynodonts such as Cynognathus, the quadrate-quadratojugal complex remains hidden within the skull, obscured from the side by the large squamosal bone which loosely articulates with it.

=== Sauropsids ===
Sauropsids, the group containing reptiles and birds, had completely lost the contact between the quadratojugal and maxilla. In diapsids, the quadratojugal and jugal form the lower temporal bar, which defines the lower border of the infratemporal fenestra, one of two holes in the side of the head. In early diapsids such as Petrolacosaurus and Youngina, the quadratojugal is long as in amphibians, early synapsids, and "anapsid" reptiles. It forms most of the length of the lower temporal bar. However, significant transformation of the temporal region of the skull occurs in many more "advanced" members of Diapsida, with implications for the structure of the quadratojugal.

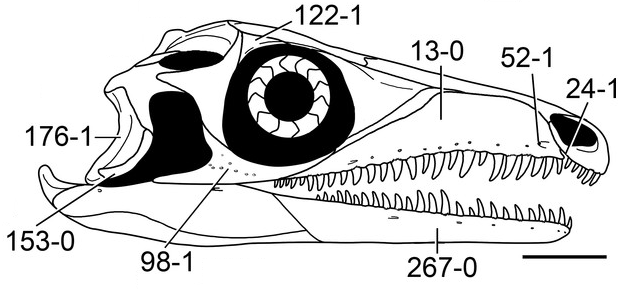
The skull of Prolacerta, a relative of the Archosauriformes with an incomplete lower temporal bar. The small, crescent-shaped quadratojugal is labelled with 153-0.

Numerous diapsids have an incomplete lower temporal bar, where the quadratojugal and jugal fail to contact each other. This leaves the infratemporal fenestra with an arch-like structure, open from below. An incomplete (or absent) lower temporal bar is first seen in the Permian genus Claudiosaurus, and is retained by most other Permian and Triassic diapsids. In many cases, the quadratojugal is lost completely. This loss occurs in several Triassic marine reptiles such as tanystropheids, thalattosaurs, pistosaurs, and plesiosaurs. Squamates, the group containing modern lizards and snakes, also lack a quadratojugal, but early squamate relatives such as Marmoretta do retain the bone. Ichthyosaurs, a group without a lower temporal bar, have a quadratojugal that is taller than it is long, stretching above (rather than below) the open infratemporal fenestra to contact the postorbital bone (rather than the jugal). Early turtles such as Proganochelys also have a tall quadratojugal, which contacts the jugal without any trace of the infratemporal fenestra.

The skull of the dromaeosaurid dinosaur Dromaeosaurus, with the quadratojugal (light blue) labelled.

Several Triassic reptiles reacquire the lower temporal bar, albeit with the jugal forming most of the bar's length. In these reptiles, the quadratojugal is a small L- or T-shaped bone at the rear edge of the skull. Although early rhynchocephalians such as Gephyrosaurus have an incomplete lower temporal bar and a quadratojugal fused to the quadrate, later members of the group such as the modern tuatara (Sphenodon) do have a complete lower temporal bar, albeit with the quadratojugal still fused to the quadrate. All members of the group Archosauriformes, which contains archosaurs such as crocodilians and dinosaurs, have a complete lower temporal bar. This is also the case in placodonts, Trilophosaurus, some rhynchosaurs, and choristoderes.

Modern birds have a quadratojugal which is assimilated into the thin, splint-like jugal. However, a separate quadratojugal is retained by several Mesozoic avialans, such as Archaeopteryx and Pterygornis. Non-avialan dinosaurs also have a separate quadratojugal.
