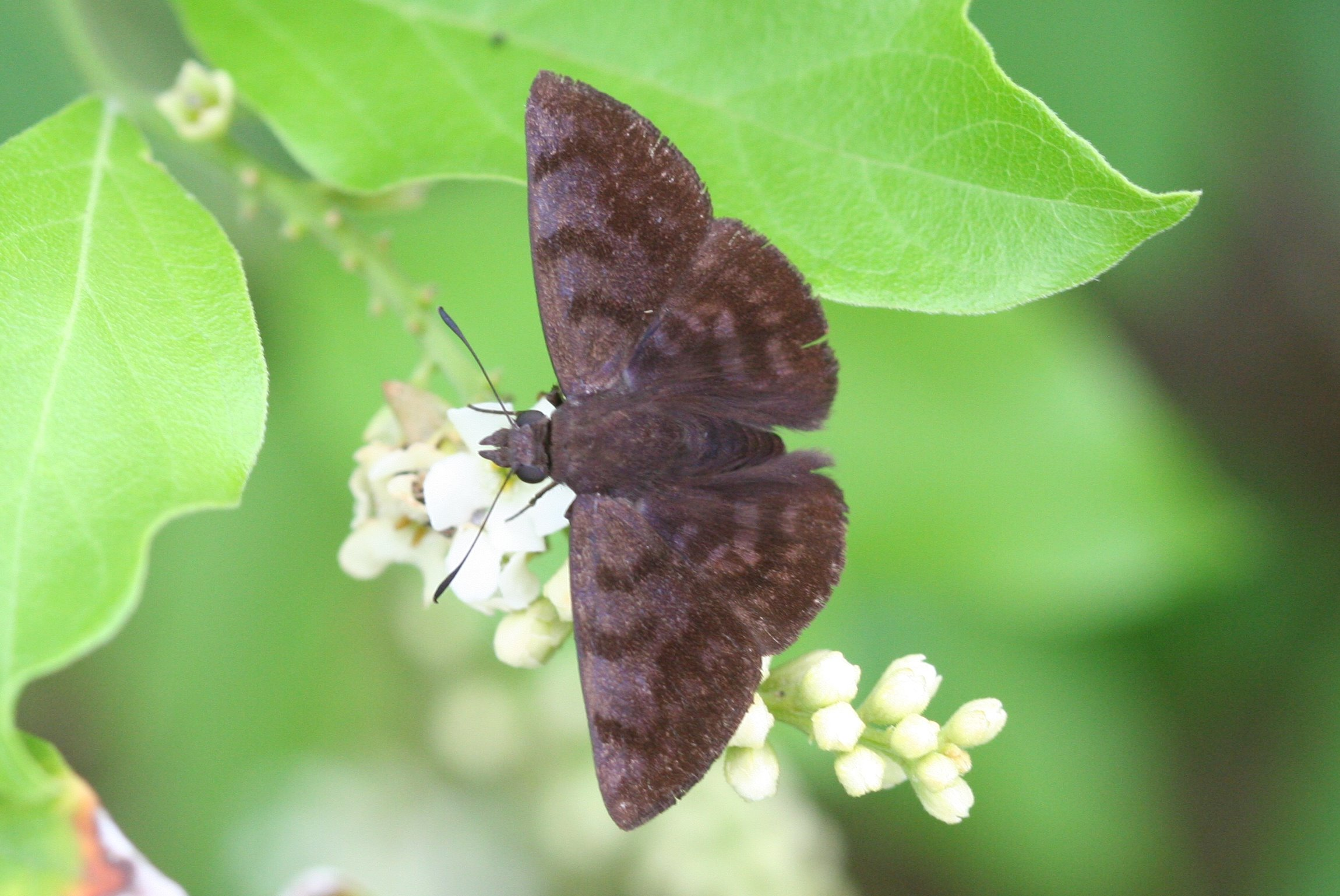

Scientific classification
- Kingdom: Animalia
- Phylum: Arthropoda
- Class: Insecta
- Order: Lepidoptera
- Family: Hesperiidae
- Genus: Pellicia
- Species: P. arina

Binomial name
- Pellicia arina Evans, 1953

= Pellicia arina =

Species of butterfly

Pellicia arina, the glazed pellicia, is a butterfly of the family Hesperiidae. It is found from Panama north through Central America to northern Mexico. Rare strays are found up to the lower Rio Grande Valley in Texas.

The wingspan is 25–38 mm. Adults are on wing from March to April and June to December in southern Texas. In Mexico and Central America, adults are on wing in July and from October to February.

The larval host is unknown. Adults probably feed on flower nectar.
