= Windia =

Scientific classification
- Kingdom: Animalia
- Phylum: Arthropoda
- Class: Insecta
- Order: Lepidoptera
- Family: Hesperiidae
- Tribe: Carcharodini
- Genus: Windia; Freeman, 1969

Genus of butterflies

Windia is a genus of skippers in the family Hesperiidae.
