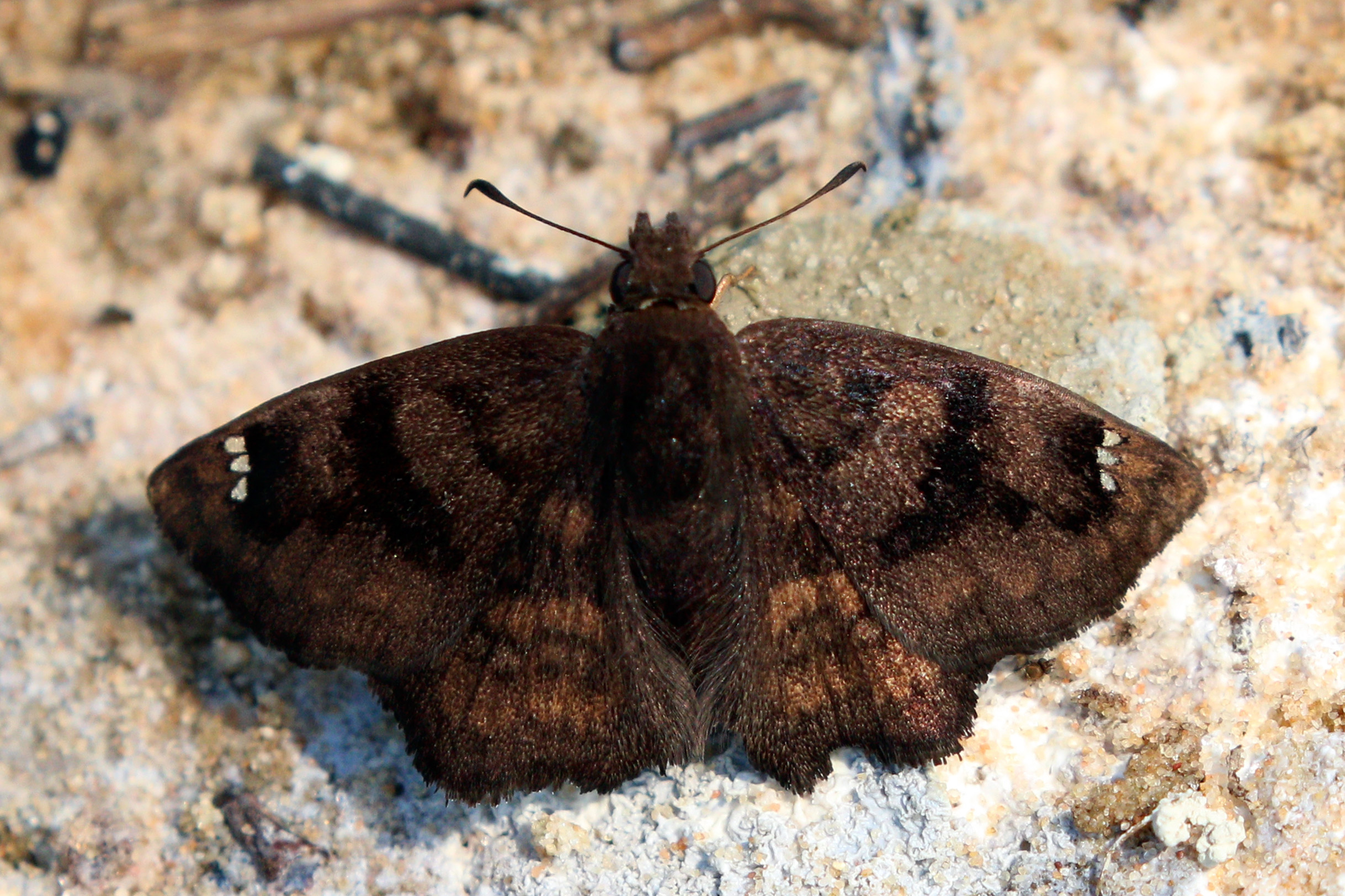
- Nisoniades macarius Cristalino River; Southern Amazon, Brazil
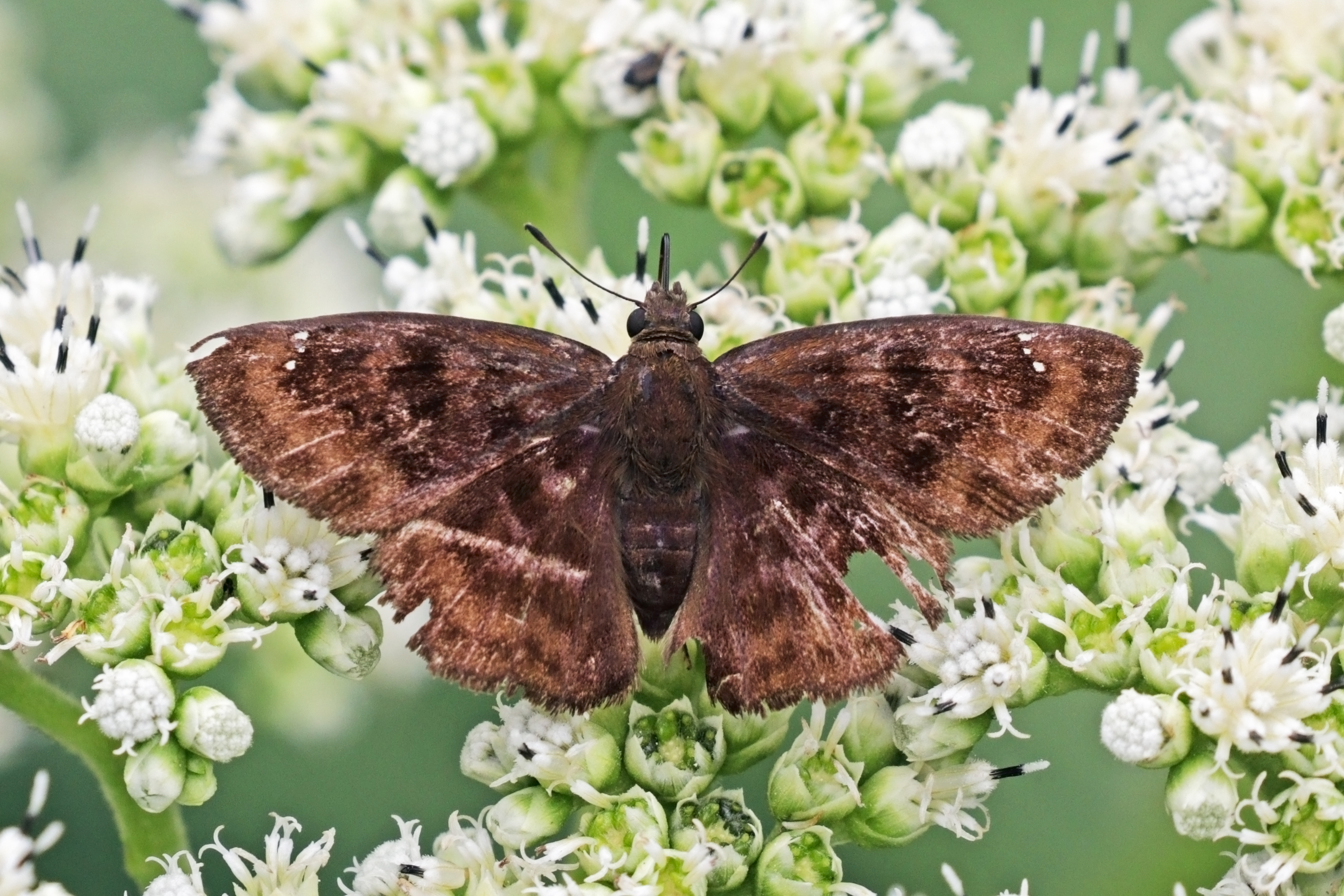
- Purplish tufted skipper Nisoniades rubescens Anton Valley, Panama

Scientific classification
- Kingdom: Animalia
- Phylum: Arthropoda
- Class: Insecta
- Order: Lepidoptera
- Family: Hesperiidae
- Tribe: Carcharodini
- Genus: Nisoniades; Hübner, [1819]

= Nisoniades =

Genus of butterflies

Nisoniades is a genus of tufted skippers in the family Hesperiidae.
