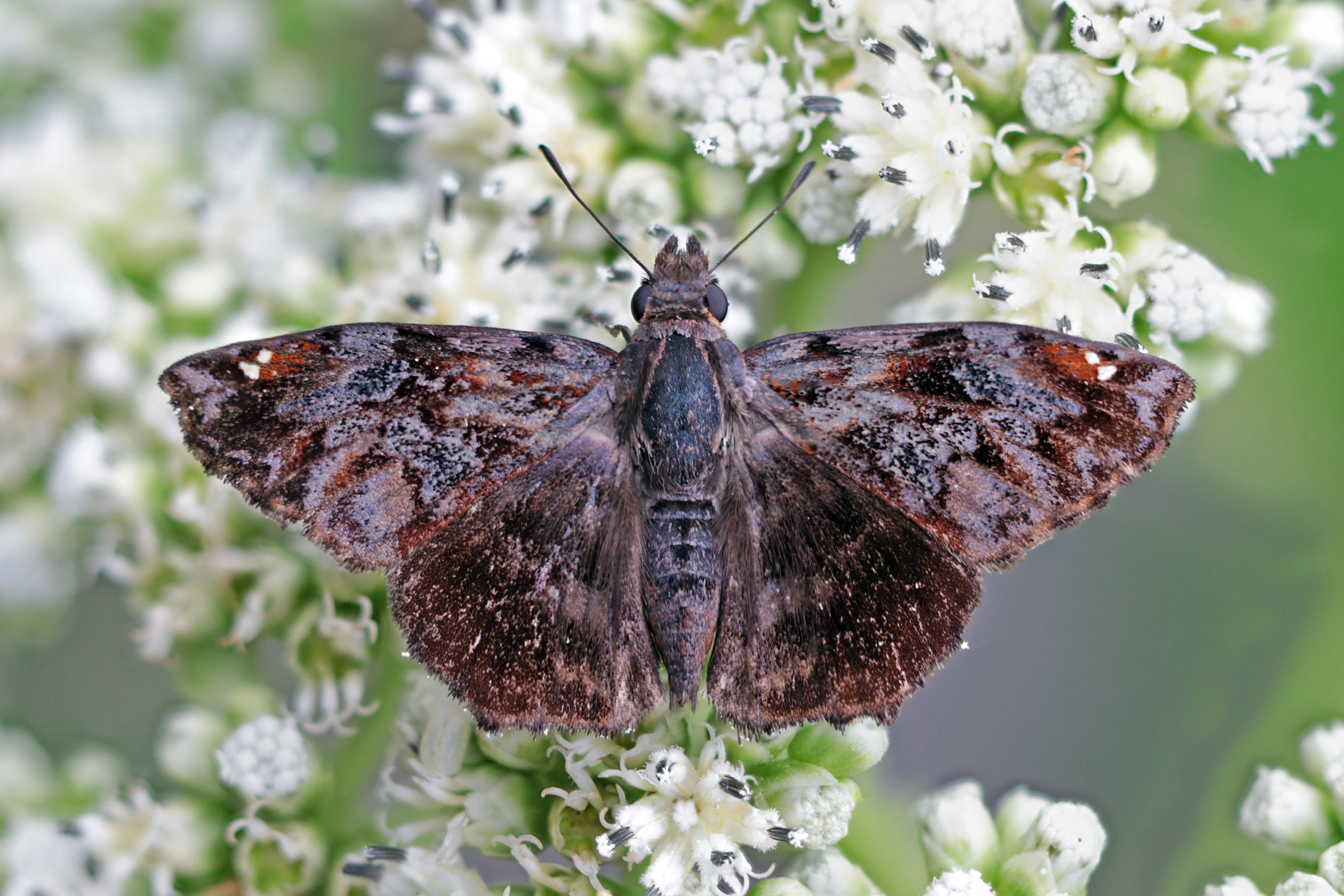
- Red-studded skipper N. stator female, Panama

Scientific classification
- Kingdom: Animalia
- Phylum: Arthropoda
- Class: Insecta
- Order: Lepidoptera
- Family: Hesperiidae
- Tribe: Carcharodini
- Genus: Noctuana; Bell, 1937

= Noctuana =

Genus of butterflies

Noctuana is a genus of skippers in the family Hesperiidae.
