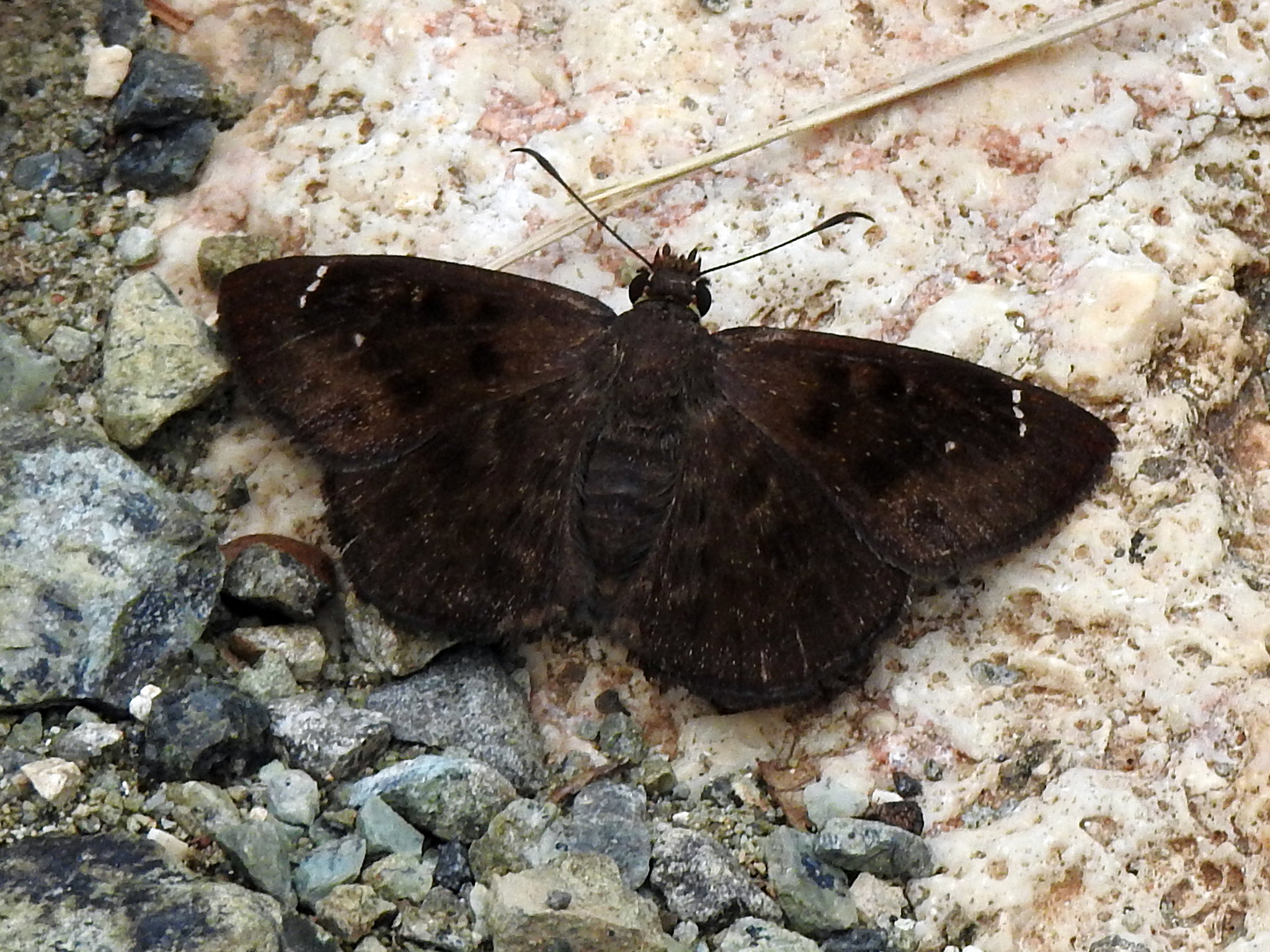
- Burca braco

Scientific classification
- Kingdom: Animalia
- Phylum: Arthropoda
- Class: Insecta
- Order: Lepidoptera
- Family: Hesperiidae
- Tribe: Carcharodini
- Genus: Burca; Bell & Comstock, 1948

= Burca (butterfly) =

Genus of butterflies

Burca is a genus of skipper butterflies in the family Hesperiidae. The genus was erected by Ernest Layton Bell and William Phillips Comstock in 1948.

== Species ==
- Burca braco (Herrich-Schäffer, 1865)
- Burca concolor (Herrich-Schäffer, 1865)
- Burca cubensis (Skinner, 1913)
- Burca hispaniolae Bell & Comstock, 1948
- Burca stillmanni Bell & Comstock, 1948
