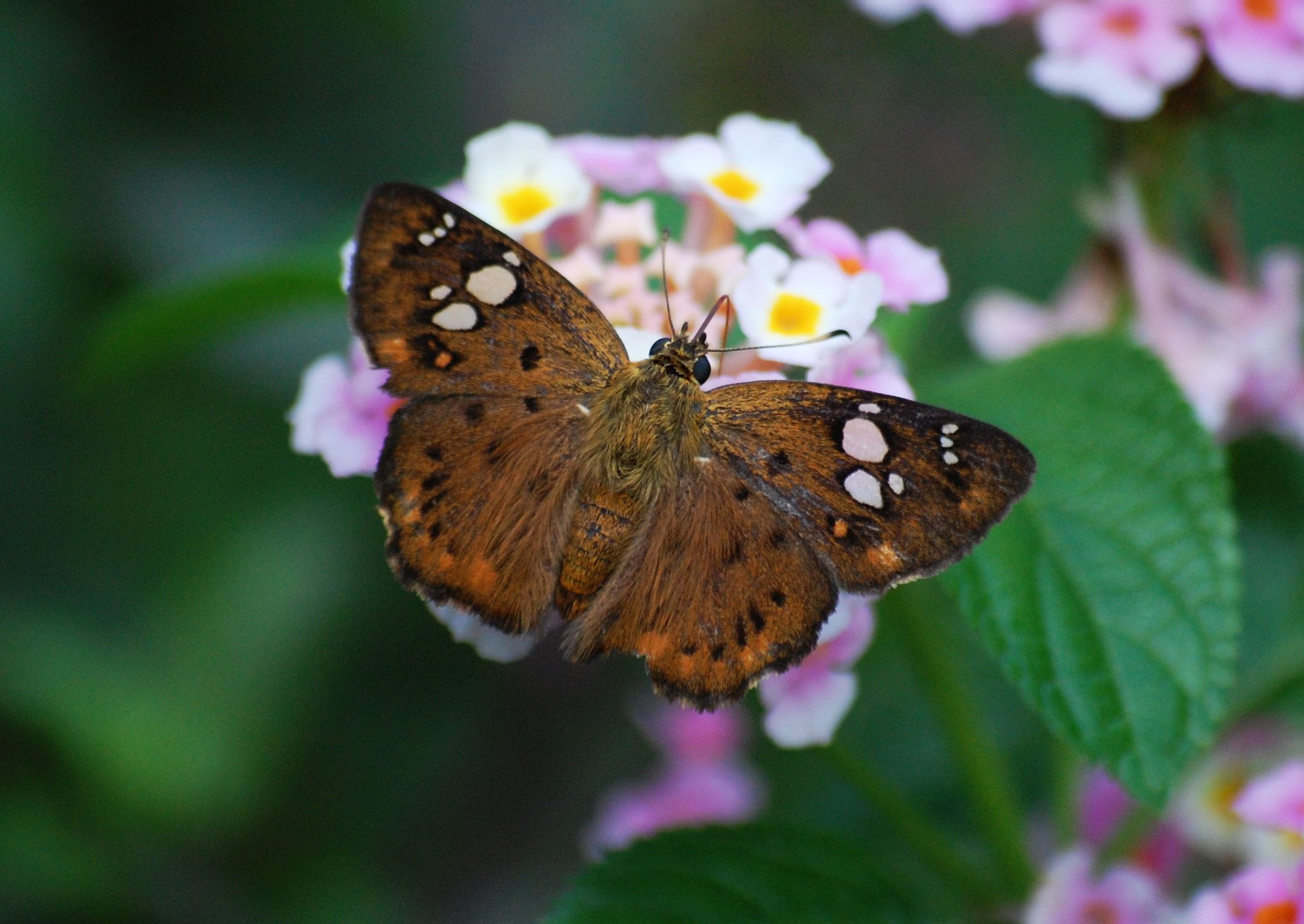

Scientific classification
- Domain: Eukaryota
- Kingdom: Animalia
- Phylum: Arthropoda
- Class: Insecta
- Order: Lepidoptera
- Family: Hesperiidae
- Genus: Coladenia
- Species: C. indrani

Binomial name
- Coladenia indrani (Moore, 1865)

= Coladenia indrani =

Tricolour pied flat

Species of butterfly

Coladenia indrani, the tricolour pied flat, is a butterfly belonging to the family Hesperiidae found in Sri Lanka, India to Myanmar. The species was first described by Frederic Moore in 1865.

== Description ==
In 1891, Edward Yerbury Watson described the butterfly as:

Upperside bright golden-yellow: forewing with a discal series of four semi-transparent white black-bordered spots, the first small and above the extremity of the cell, the second large quadrate and within the cell, the third elongate and beneath the latter, the fourth exterior to their juncture: beneath these is a pale golden -yellow black- bordered spot: before the apex is a series of four similar white spots with black border, the three upper of which are conjugated; a well-defined black spot beneath the cell near the base; exterior margin and cilia blackish, the latter white at the posterior angle: hindwing with a semi-circular submarginal series of black spots and two similar inner discal spots; exterior margin black; cilia alternate black and white. Underside blackish-brown suffused with golden-yellow, brightest on the hindwing: markings as above but more clearly defined. Tip of palpi black: thorax, body, palpi (except tip), and legs yellow- Antennae yellow, tip black.

— E. Y. Watson

Expanse of 1.75 inches.

It is found in Odisha, Sikkim, central India and the Western Ghats.
