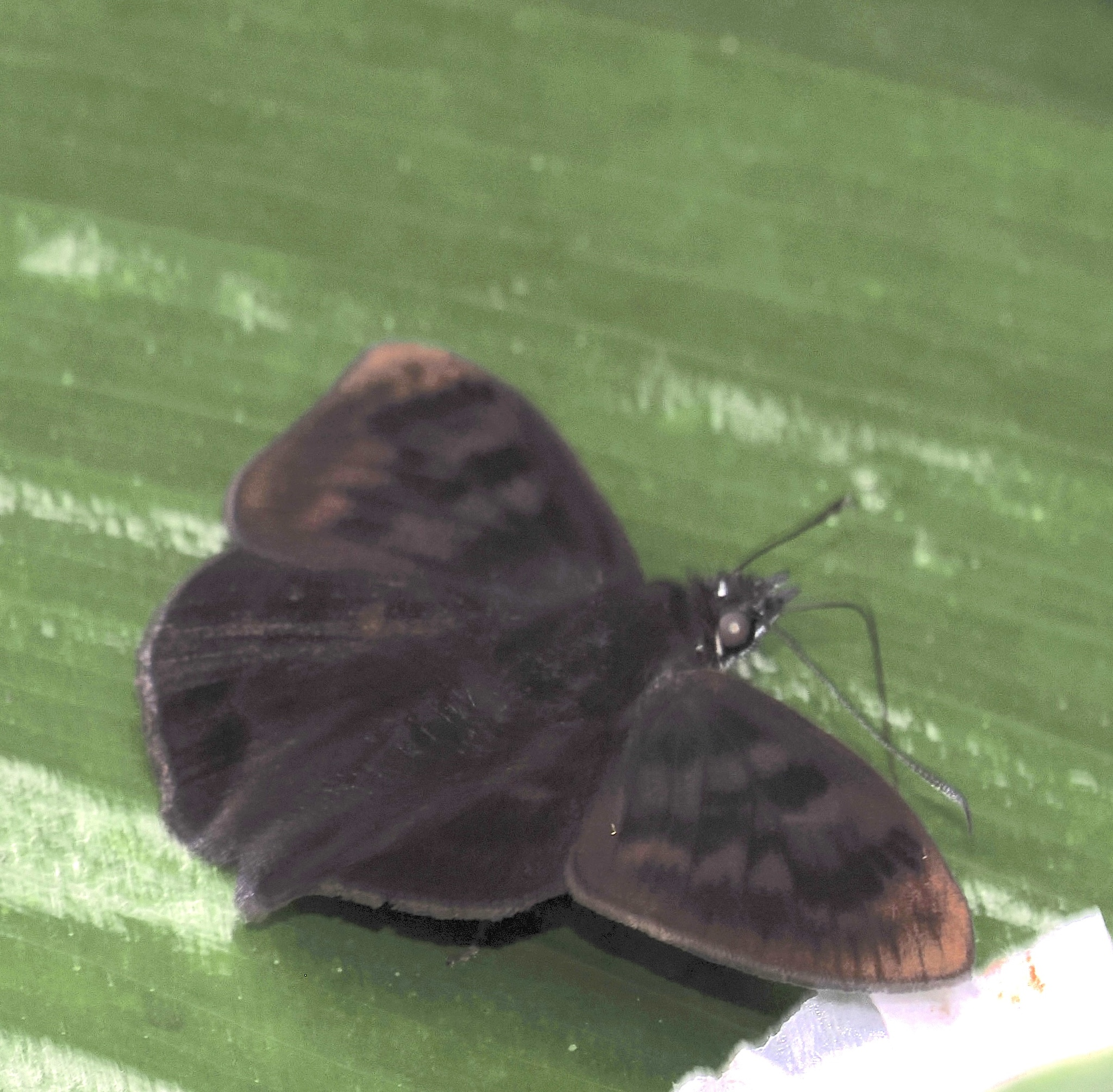
- Iliana heros

Scientific classification
- Kingdom: Animalia
- Phylum: Arthropoda
- Clade: Pancrustacea
- Class: Insecta
- Order: Lepidoptera
- Family: Hesperiidae
- Tribe: Carcharodini
- Genus: Iliana; E.L. Bell, 1937

= Iliana =

Genus of butterflies

Iliana is a genus of skippers in the family Hesperiidae. It was first described in 1937 by Ernest Layton Bell, with Iliana romulus as the type species. Species of the genus have a neotropical distribution.

== Distribution ==
Species mainly occur in Peru, Brazil and Bolivia, with one species, Iliana remus, additionally known from French Guiana.

== Taxonomy ==
=== Placement within the Hesperiidae ===
The placement of Iliana within the Hesperiidae is not fully resolved. It has traditionally been placed within the Pyrgini, but Warren et al. (2008, 2009) place it in Carcharodini, which has been followed by many but not all subsequent publications including the genus. Mielke and Casagrande (2016) argue for its placement to remain in tribe Pyrgini until more in-depth reclassification has taken place.

=== Species ===
At the time the genus was erected, it contained two species, Iliana remus and Iliana romulus, with the latter assigned as type species. Both species were at the time newly described by Bell from specimens from the collection of Hesperiidae held by the National Museum of Natural History. The specimens were originally collected at the Putumayo river in Peru. In 1953, Evans transferred Telemiades purpurascens and Echelatus heros to Iliana, and described a new subspecies of the latter, Iliana heros heroica.

In a 2016 revision by Olaf Hermann Hendrik Mielke and Mirna Martins Casagrande, several changes to the genus were made: Eurypterus peruvianus and Tosta sapasoa were transferred to Iliana; Tosta capra and Tosta saltarana were synonymized to Iliana romulus; I. purpurascens and I. heros were transferred out of the genus; and three new species of Iliana were described.

As of Mielke & Casagrande 2016, the genus contains the following species:

- Iliana peruvianus (Mabille, 1883)
- Iliana bolivianus Mielke & Casagrande, 2016
- Iliana miersi Mielke & Casagrande, 2016
- Iliana nirtoni Mielke & Casagrande, 2016
- Iliana sapasoa (Nicolay, 1973)
- Iliana remus E.L. Bell, 1937
- Iliana romulus E.L. Bell, 1937

==== Formerly included ====
- Iliana heros (Mabille & Boulet, 1916) – transferred to Austinus heros
- Iliana purpurascens (Mabille & Boullet, 1912) – transferred to Emmelus purpurascens

=== Original description ===
In Bell, Ernest Layton (1937). "New genera and species of Neotropical Hesperiidae with notes on others (Lepidoptera, Rhopalocera)" (PDF). American Museum Novitates (914): 8–10.
