= Morvina =

Scientific classification
- Kingdom: Animalia
- Phylum: Arthropoda
- Class: Insecta
- Order: Lepidoptera
- Family: Hesperiidae
- Tribe: Carcharodini
- Genus: Morvina; Evans, 1953

Genus of butterflies

Morvina is a genus of skippers in the family Hesperiidae.

== Bibliography ==
- Natural History Museum Lepidoptera genus database
