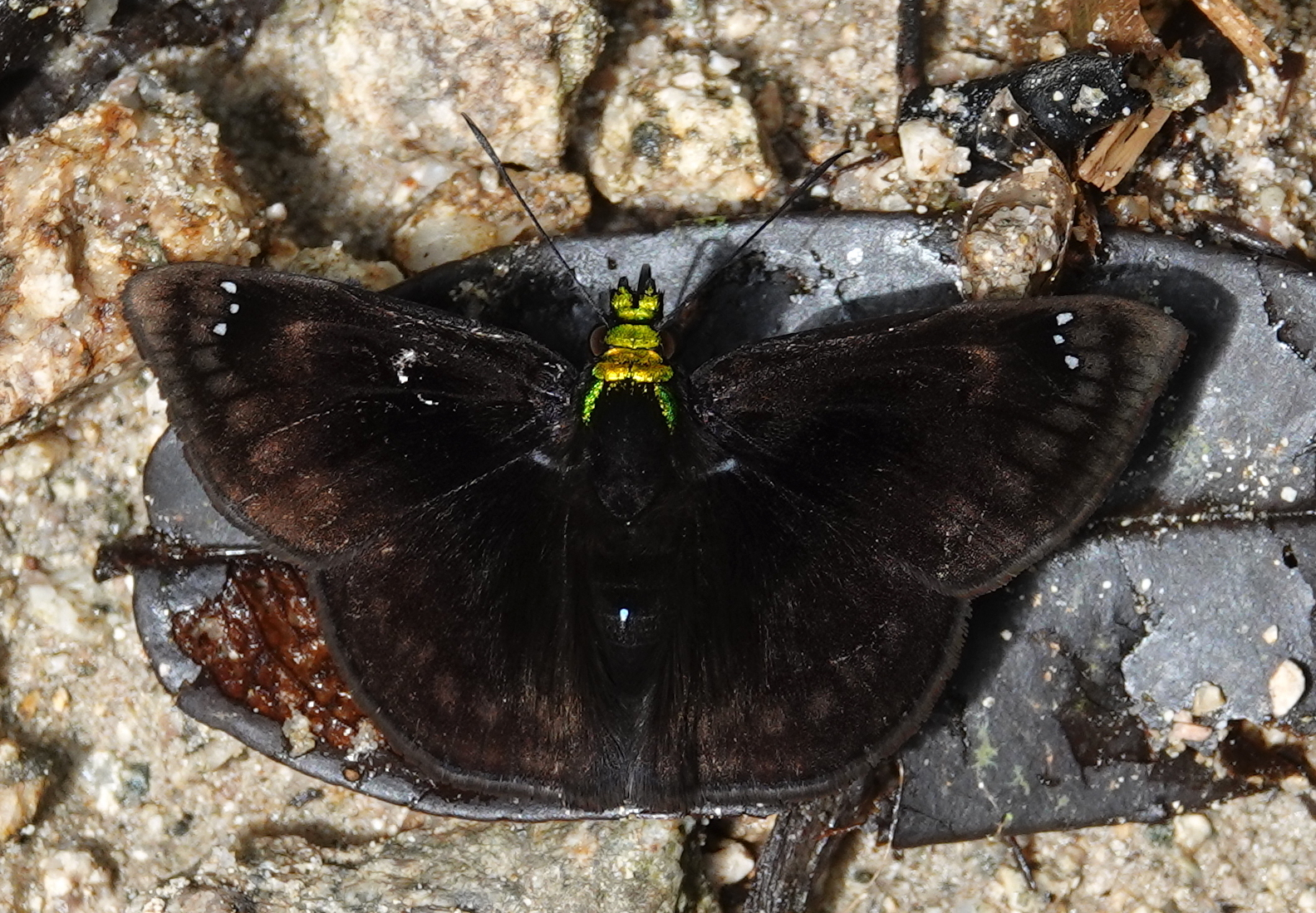
- Gorgopas chlorocephala

Scientific classification
- Kingdom: Animalia
- Phylum: Arthropoda
- Class: Insecta
- Order: Lepidoptera
- Family: Hesperiidae
- Tribe: Carcharodini
- Genus: Gorgopas; Godman & Salvin, [1894]

= Gorgopas (butterfly) =

Genus of butterflies

Gorgopas is a genus of skippers in the family Hesperiidae.

== Species ==
Recognised species in the genus Gorgopas include:

- Gorgopas agylla (Mabille, 1898)
- Gorgopas chlorocephala (Herrich Schäffer, 1870)
- Gorgopas extensa (Mabille, 1891)
- Gorgopas petale (Mabille, 1888)
- Gorgopas trochilus (Hopffer, 1874)
