= Conognathus =

Conognathus platon

Scientific classification
- Kingdom: Animalia
- Phylum: Arthropoda
- Class: Insecta
- Order: Lepidoptera
- Family: Hesperiidae
- Genus: Conognathus; C. & R.Felder, 1862
- Species: C. platon

Binomial name
- Conognathus platon C. & R. Felder, 1862

Genus of butterflies

Conognathus is a genus of skippers in the family Hesperiidae. It is monotypic, being represented by the single species Conognathus platon.
