= Jera (butterfly) =

Jera tricuspidata

Scientific classification
- Kingdom: Animalia
- Phylum: Arthropoda
- Class: Insecta
- Order: Lepidoptera
- Family: Hesperiidae
- Genus: Jera; Lindsey, 1925
- Species: J. tricuspidata

Binomial name
- Jera tricuspidata (Mabille, 1902)

Genus of butterflies

Jera is a genus of skippers in the family Hesperiidae. It is monotypic, being represented by the single species Jera tricuspidata.
