= Ocella =

Scientific classification
- Kingdom: Animalia
- Phylum: Arthropoda
- Class: Insecta
- Order: Lepidoptera
- Family: Hesperiidae
- Tribe: Carcharodini
- Genus: Ocella; Evans, 1953

Genus of butterflies

"Ocella" is also a generic brand of oral drospirenone contraceptive.

Ocella is a genus of skippers in the family Hesperiidae.
