= Mimia (butterfly) =

Scientific classification
- Kingdom: Animalia
- Phylum: Arthropoda
- Class: Insecta
- Order: Lepidoptera
- Family: Hesperiidae
- Tribe: Carcharodini
- Genus: Mimia; Evans, 1953

Species
- M. chiapaensis M. phydile

Genus of butterflies

Mimia is a genus of skippers in the family Hesperiidae.
