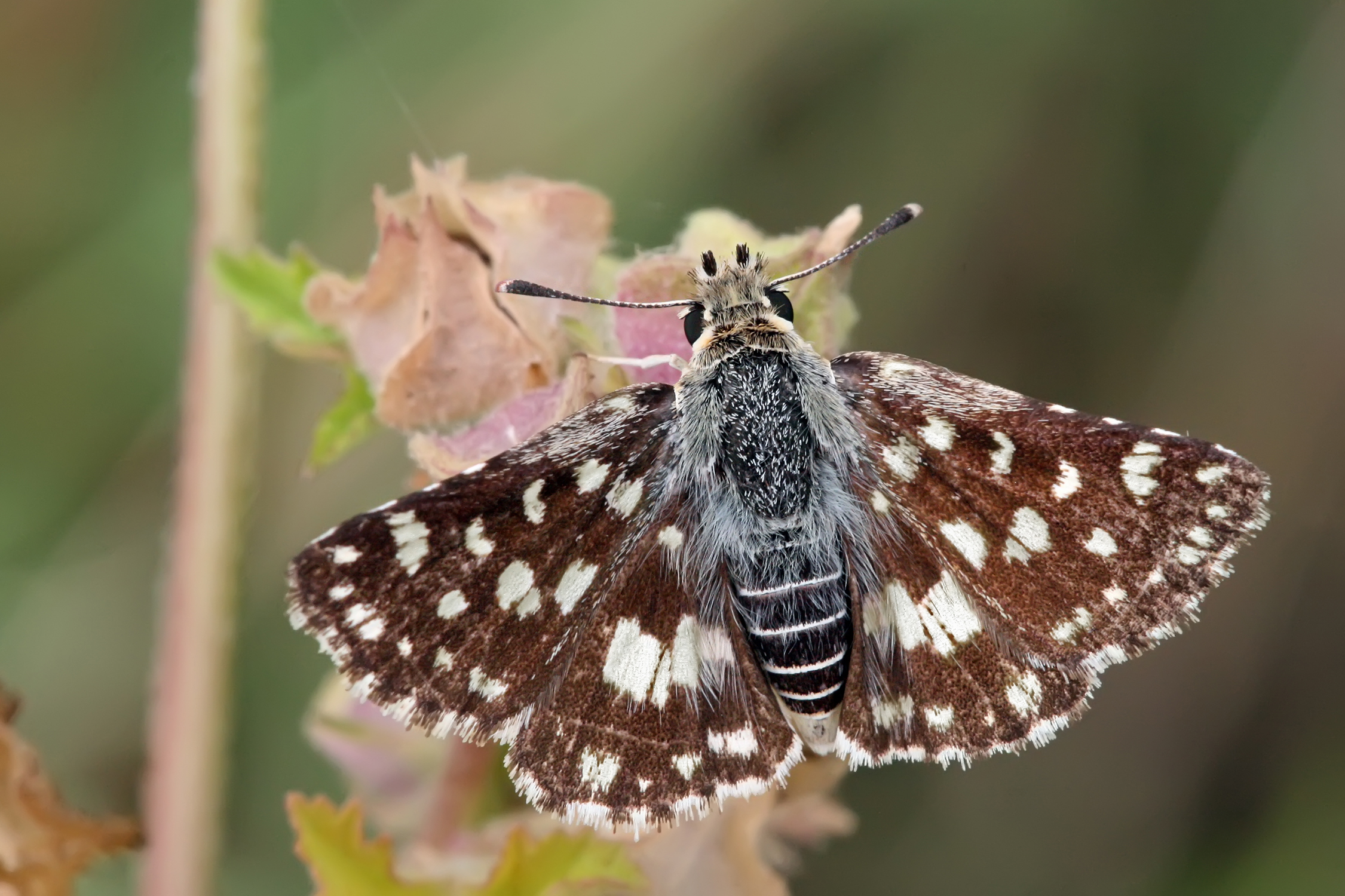
- Spialia mafa in the Ngorongoro Crater, Tanzania

Scientific classification
- Kingdom: Animalia
- Phylum: Arthropoda
- Clade: Pancrustacea
- Class: Insecta
- Order: Lepidoptera
- Family: Hesperiidae
- Subfamily: Pyrginae; Burmeister, 1878

Diversity
- 4 tribes

= Spread-winged skipper =

Spread-winged skippers

Subfamily of butterflies

Pyrginae, commonly known as spread-winged skippers, are a subfamily of the skipper butterfly family (Hesperiidae). The subfamily was established by Hermann Burmeister in 1878. Their delimitation and internal systematics has changed considerably in recent years with the most recent review being in 2019.

It still is the second-largest subfamily of skipper butterflies, although of its over 1,000 species a considerable number are no longer in that classification.

== Description and distribution ==
Typical resting positions

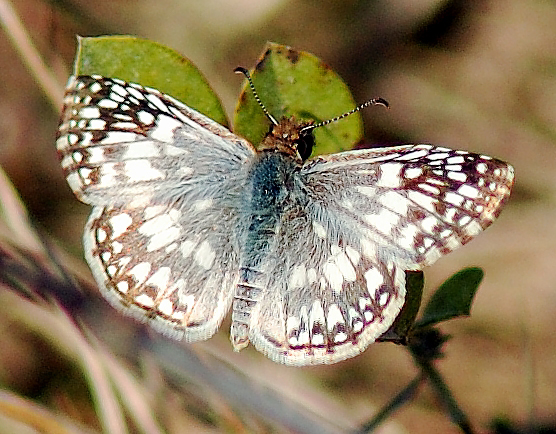
Pyrgus oileus from Florida (Pyrgini)

Spread-winged skippers bask with their wings held wide open. The wings are held closed when they are at rest. They are usually brown, black, or checkered, but some are brilliantly coloured. Some have long tailed hind wings.

Males maintain territories and frequently perch on overhanging branches and tree trunks. They do not visit flowers for sustenance, but rather drink fluids from dung, carrion, and rotting fruit.

A large and successful subfamily, the spread-winged skippers are found essentially worldwide, except in very cold or desert regions. They probably originated in the tropics and subsequently extended their range into more temperate regions.

Most of the more advanced tribes, on the other hand, are very diverse in the Neotropics, which their ancestors would have found most easy to reach by crossing the central Atlantic Ocean, rather than taking the longer route via Europe and North America or the Pacific Ocean. It is also possible that the group originated in the Neotropics and subsequently dispersed eastwards to Africa via the Intertropical Convergence Zone.

== Tribes ==
The four tribes of the Pyrginae in their modern circumscription are, in phylogenetic sequence:

- Carcharodini
- Achlyodidini
- Erynnini
- Pyrgini

=== Former tribes ===
- Celaenorrhinini - now placed within the subfamily Tagiadinae
- Eudamini - now placed within the subfamily Eudaminae
- Tagiadini - now placed within the subfamily Tagiadinae
- Pyrrhopygini - now placed within the subfamily Pyrrhopyginae
