= Sootywing =

Sootywing is the common name of several species and subspecies of butterfly, including:

== Genus Bolla ==
- Bolla brennus brennus, the obscure sootywing
- Bolla clytius, the mottled sootywing
- Bolla cupreiceps, the copper-headed sootywing
- Bolla cybele, the Veracruzan sootywing
- Bolla cyclops, the Cyclops sootywing
- Bolla cylindus, the checkered sootywing
- Bolla eusebius, the spatulate sootywing
- Bolla evippe, the rough-tipped sootywing
- Bolla fenestra, the Oaxacan sootywing
- Bolla guerra, the Guerrero sootywing
- Bolla imbras, the rounded sootywing
- Bolla litus, the many-spotted sootywing
- Bolla oriza, the Orizaba sootywing
- Bolla orsines, the hook-tipped sootywing
- Bolla solitaria, the solitary sootywing
- Bolla subapicatus, the fin-tipped sootywing
- Bolla zorilla, the zorilla sootywing

== Genus Hesperopsis ==
- Hesperopsis alpheus, the saltbush sootywing
- Hesperopsis gracielae, the Macneill's sootywing
- Hesperopsis libya, the Mojave sootywing

== Genus Pholisora ==
- Pholisora catullus, the common sootywing
- Pholisora mejicanus, Mexican sootywing

== Genus Staphylus ==
- Staphylus ascalaphus, the Central American sootywing
- Staphylus azteca, the Aztec sootywing
- Staphylus ceos, the golden-headed sootywing
- Staphylus iguala, the Iguala sootywing
- Staphylus lenis, the lenis sootywing
- Staphylus mazans, the Mazans sootywing
- Staphylus oeta, the Plötz's sootywing
- Staphylus tepeca, the grizzled sootywing
- Staphylus tierra, the West-Mexican sootywing
- Staphylus vincula, the mountain sootywing
- Staphylus vulgata, the golden-snouted sootywing
