= Boenasa =

Scientific classification
- Kingdom: Animalia
- Phylum: Arthropoda
- Class: Insecta
- Order: Lepidoptera
- Superfamily: Noctuoidea
- Family: Erebidae
- Subfamily: Arctiinae
- Tribe: Lithosiini
- Genus: Boenasa; Walker, 1865

Synonyms
- Torycus Herrich-Schäffer, 1866

Genus of moths

Boenasa is a genus of moths in the subfamily Arctiinae. The genus was erected by Francis Walker in 1865. The known species are from the Greater Antilles.

== Species ==
- Boenasa angelica Schaus, 1924 – Dominican Republic
- Boenasa benedicti Laguerre, 2020 – Dominican Republic
- Boenasa davidsoni Laguerre, 2024 – Dominican Republic
- Boenasa domingonis (Schaus, 1924) – Dominican Republic
- Boenasa keegani Laguerre, 2024 – Dominican Republic
- Boenasa nigrorosea Walker, [1865] – Dominican Republic
- Boenasa tricolor (Herrich-Schaffer, 1866) – Cuba

For Boenasa polyphron Druce, 1894, see Virbia polyphron (Druce, 1894).
