= Oeta =

Oeta or OETA may refer to:

- Mount Oeta in Greece
- An ancient city, said to have been founded by Amphissus, son of Apollo and Dryope
- Staphylus oeta, a butterfly of family Hesperiidae
- Oklahoma Educational Television Authority, a public television network in Oklahoma, United States
- Occupied Enemy Territory Administration, a period of British and French control over Arab-majority areas of the former Ottoman Empire, during and following World War I
- Occupied Enemy Territory Administration (Ethiopia), British military occupation administration in Ethiopia during World War II
