= Virbia immaculata =

Scientific classification
- Domain: Eukaryota
- Kingdom: Animalia
- Phylum: Arthropoda
- Class: Insecta
- Order: Lepidoptera
- Superfamily: Noctuoidea
- Family: Erebidae
- Subfamily: Arctiinae
- Genus: Virbia
- Species: V. immaculata

Binomial name
- Virbia immaculata (Reakirt, 1864)

Synonyms
- Crocota immaculata Reakirt, 1864; Holomelina immaculata

Species of moth

Virbia immaculata, the immaculate holomelina or plain-winged holomelina, is a moth in the family Erebidae. It was described by Tryon Reakirt in 1864. It is found from the eastern coast of North America west to Manitoba. It has also been recorded in Iowa, Illinois and Indiana.

Larvae have been reared on dandelion and plantain species.
