= Virbia nigricans =

Scientific classification
- Domain: Eukaryota
- Kingdom: Animalia
- Phylum: Arthropoda
- Class: Insecta
- Order: Lepidoptera
- Superfamily: Noctuoidea
- Family: Erebidae
- Subfamily: Arctiinae
- Genus: Virbia
- Species: V. nigricans

Binomial name
- Virbia nigricans (Reakirt, 1864)

Synonyms
- Crocota nigricans Reakirt, 1864; Holomelina nigricans; Cothocida nigrifera Walker, 1865

Species of moth

Virbia nigricans is a moth in the family Erebidae. It was described by Tryon Reakirt in 1864. It is found in the United States in secondary secession habitats of western New Jersey and Pennsylvania.

The length of the forewings is about 8.2 mm for males and 9.3 mm for females. There are two generations per year with adults on wing from late May to June and again from early to mid-August.
