= Pholisora crestar =

Conservation status
- Imperiled (NatureServe)

Scientific classification
- Kingdom: Animalia
- Phylum: Arthropoda
- Clade: Pancrustacea
- Class: Insecta
- Order: Lepidoptera
- Family: Hesperiidae
- Genus: Pholisora
- Species: P. crestar

Binomial name
- Pholisora crestar Scott & Davenport, 2017

Synonyms
- Pholisora catullus crestar Scott & Davenport, 2017

Species of butterfly

Pholisora crestar is a species of skipper butterfly in the family Hesperiidae, native to the southern Sierra Nevada of California. First described in 2017 as a subspecies of the common sootywing, Pholisora catullus, it was raised to species rank in 2020 based on genomic evidence.

== Taxonomy ==
Pholisora catullus crestar was described by James A. Scott and Ken E. Davenport in 2017 from specimens in the C. P. Gillette Museum of Arthropod Diversity at Colorado State University. The holotype male was collected in Dry Creek Canyon, Tulare County, California, in 2013.

A 2020 genomic study by Jing Zhang, Qian Cong, Jinhui Shen, Paul A. Opler, and Nick V. Grishin sequenced the genomes of the holotype and paratypes and found pronounced genetic differentiation from P. catullus, with statistics indicating very limited gene exchange and reproductive isolation between the two. On this basis they elevated crestar to species rank, reversing its earlier synonymization with P. catullus in Jonathan P. Pelham's catalogue. The same study found that one original paratype, from Mono County, was genetically P. catullus rather than P. crestar.

== Etymology ==
The name crestar refers to the "starry" row of small white dots on the hindwing, resembling stars in a crescent across the dark wing surface.

== Description ==
Pholisora crestar closely resembles P. catullus but nearly all individuals show a submarginal row of tiny white spots on the dorsal hindwing, usually with smaller spots on the forewing as well; these are reduced or absent below. In P. catullus generally, only about a third or fewer of individuals show any trace of this spotting.

== Distribution ==
The species is centered on the southern Sierra Nevada of Kern and Tulare counties, California. Populations east of the Sierra crest, in the Owens Valley and adjacent Mono County, show weaker or absent spotting and intergrade with P. catullus; genomic data confirmed at least one Mono County specimen to be P. catullus. Similarly spotted individuals have also been noted from southern California, though not yet confirmed as P. crestar.

== Biology ==
As in P. catullus, larvae are presumed to feed on weedy Amaranthaceae such as Amaranthus and Chenopodium.
