= V. laeta =

V. laeta may refer to:

- Venus laeta, a saltwater clam
- Veronica laeta, a bird's eye
- Virbia laeta, a Northern American moth
