= Virbia minuta =

Scientific classification
- Domain: Eukaryota
- Kingdom: Animalia
- Phylum: Arthropoda
- Class: Insecta
- Order: Lepidoptera
- Superfamily: Noctuoidea
- Family: Erebidae
- Subfamily: Arctiinae
- Genus: Virbia
- Species: V. minuta

Binomial name
- Virbia minuta (Felder, 1874)

Synonyms
- Terna minuta Felder, 1874

Species of moth

Virbia minuta is a moth in the family Erebidae. It was described by Felder in 1874. It is found in Amazonas in Brazil and in Mexico.
