= Virbia luteilinea =

Scientific classification
- Kingdom: Animalia
- Phylum: Arthropoda
- Class: Insecta
- Order: Lepidoptera
- Superfamily: Noctuoidea
- Family: Erebidae
- Subfamily: Arctiinae
- Genus: Virbia
- Species: V. luteilinea

Binomial name
- Virbia luteilinea Walker, 1854

Synonyms
- Josiodes inversa H. Edwards, 1884

Species of moth

Virbia luteilinea is a moth in the family Erebidae. It was described by Francis Walker in 1854. It is found in Mexico, Guatemala, Nicaragua, Panama and Colombia.
