= Virbia sanguicollis =

Scientific classification
- Kingdom: Animalia
- Phylum: Arthropoda
- Class: Insecta
- Order: Lepidoptera
- Superfamily: Noctuoidea
- Family: Erebidae
- Subfamily: Arctiinae
- Genus: Virbia
- Species: V. sanguicollis

Binomial name
- Virbia sanguicollis Hampson, 1901

Synonyms
- Virbia sanguicollis ab. subbasalis Strand, 1919

Species of moth

Virbia sanguicollis is a moth in the family Erebidae first described by George Hampson in 1901. It is found in Costa Rica.
