= Virbia epione =

Scientific classification
- Domain: Eukaryota
- Kingdom: Animalia
- Phylum: Arthropoda
- Class: Insecta
- Order: Lepidoptera
- Superfamily: Noctuoidea
- Family: Erebidae
- Subfamily: Arctiinae
- Genus: Virbia
- Species: V. epione

Binomial name
- Virbia epione H. Druce, 1911

Species of moth

Virbia epione is a moth in the family Erebidae. It was described by Herbert Druce in 1911. It is found in Peru, French Guiana and Costa Rica.
