= Virbia varians =

Scientific classification
- Domain: Eukaryota
- Kingdom: Animalia
- Phylum: Arthropoda
- Class: Insecta
- Order: Lepidoptera
- Superfamily: Noctuoidea
- Family: Erebidae
- Subfamily: Arctiinae
- Genus: Virbia
- Species: V. varians

Binomial name
- Virbia varians Schaus, 1892

Species of moth

Virbia varians is a moth in the family Erebidae first described by William Schaus in 1892. It is found in Peru.
