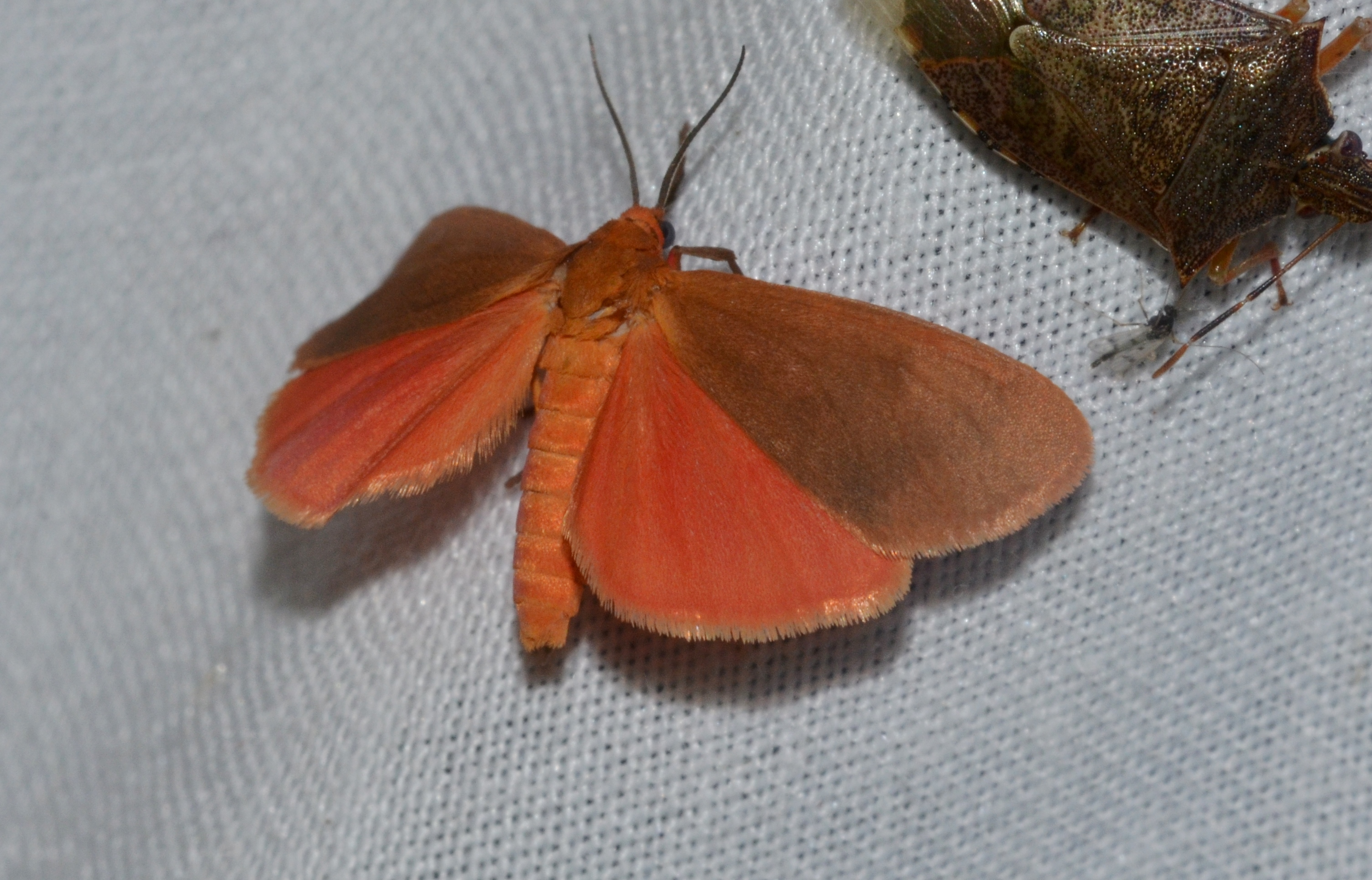

Scientific classification
- Kingdom: Animalia
- Phylum: Arthropoda
- Clade: Pancrustacea
- Class: Insecta
- Order: Lepidoptera
- Superfamily: Noctuoidea
- Family: Erebidae
- Subfamily: Arctiinae
- Genus: Virbia
- Species: V. rubicundaria

Binomial name
- Virbia rubicundaria (Hübner, 1827)

Synonyms
- Crocota rubicundaria Hübner, 1827; Holomelina rubicundaria; Crocota belfragei Stretch, 1885; Crocota diminutiva Graef, 1887; Crocota rosa French, 1890

= Virbia rubicundaria =

Species of moth

Virbia rubicundaria, the ruddy holomelina, black-banded holomelina or least holomelina, is a moth in the family Erebidae. It is found from Georgia and Florida, along the Gulf Coast to eastern Texas.

The length of the forewings is about 8.9 mm for males and 8.7 mm for females. There are multiple generations per year with adults on wing year-round.

Larvae have been reared on dandelion species and Lactuca floridana.
