= Virbia xanthopleura =

Scientific classification
- Kingdom: Animalia
- Phylum: Arthropoda
- Class: Insecta
- Order: Lepidoptera
- Superfamily: Noctuoidea
- Family: Erebidae
- Subfamily: Arctiinae
- Genus: Virbia
- Species: V. xanthopleura

Binomial name
- Virbia xanthopleura (Hampson, 1898)

Synonyms
- Ptychoglene xanthopleura Hampson, 1898

Species of moth

Virbia xanthopleura is a moth in the family Erebidae first described by George Hampson in 1898. It is found in Grenada.
