= Virbia rosenbergi =

Scientific classification
- Kingdom: Animalia
- Phylum: Arthropoda
- Clade: Pancrustacea
- Class: Insecta
- Order: Lepidoptera
- Superfamily: Noctuoidea
- Family: Erebidae
- Subfamily: Arctiinae
- Genus: Virbia
- Species: V. rosenbergi

Binomial name
- Virbia rosenbergi Rothschild, 1910

Species of moth

Virbia rosenbergi is a moth in the family Erebidae first described by Walter Rothschild in 1910. It is found in Colombia and Ecuador.
