= Virbia elisca =

Scientific classification
- Kingdom: Animalia
- Phylum: Arthropoda
- Class: Insecta
- Order: Lepidoptera
- Superfamily: Noctuoidea
- Family: Erebidae
- Subfamily: Arctiinae
- Genus: Virbia
- Species: V. elisca

Binomial name
- Virbia elisca Dyar, 1913

Species of moth

Virbia elisca is a moth in the family Erebidae. It was described by Harrison Gray Dyar Jr. in 1913. It is found in Peru., French Guiana and Ecuador.
