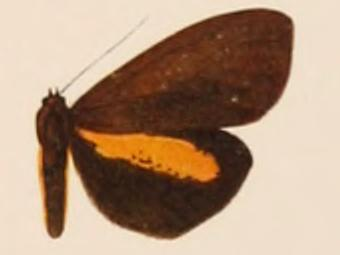

Scientific classification
- Domain: Eukaryota
- Kingdom: Animalia
- Phylum: Arthropoda
- Class: Insecta
- Order: Lepidoptera
- Superfamily: Noctuoidea
- Family: Erebidae
- Subfamily: Arctiinae
- Genus: Virbia
- Species: V. fasciata

Binomial name
- Virbia fasciata Rothschild, 1910

= Virbia fasciata =

Species of moth

Virbia fasciata is a moth of the family Erebidae first described by Walter Rothschild in 1910. It is found in Ecuador.
