= Virbia tenuicincta =

Scientific classification
- Kingdom: Animalia
- Phylum: Arthropoda
- Class: Insecta
- Order: Lepidoptera
- Superfamily: Noctuoidea
- Family: Erebidae
- Subfamily: Arctiinae
- Genus: Virbia
- Species: V. tenuicincta

Binomial name
- Virbia tenuicincta (Hampson, 1901)

Synonyms
- Holomelina tenuicincta Hampson, 1901

Species of moth

Virbia tenuicincta is a moth in the family Erebidae first described by George Hampson in 1901. It is found in Peru.
