= Virbia catama =

Scientific classification
- Kingdom: Animalia
- Phylum: Arthropoda
- Class: Insecta
- Order: Lepidoptera
- Superfamily: Noctuoidea
- Family: Erebidae
- Subfamily: Arctiinae
- Genus: Virbia
- Species: V. catama

Binomial name
- Virbia catama Dyar, 1913

Species of moth

Virbia catama is a moth in the family Erebidae. It was described by Harrison Gray Dyar Jr. in 1913. It is found in Peru.
