= Boenasa tricolor =

Scientific classification
- Kingdom: Animalia
- Phylum: Arthropoda
- Class: Insecta
- Order: Lepidoptera
- Superfamily: Noctuoidea
- Family: Erebidae
- Subfamily: Arctiinae
- Genus: Boenasa
- Species: B. tricolor

Binomial name
- Boenasa tricolor (Herrich-Schäffer, 1866)

Synonyms
- Torycus tricolor Herrich-Schäffer, 1866; Boenasa toryca Schaus, 1924

Species of insect

Boenasa tricolor is a moth in the subfamily Arctiinae first described by Gottlieb August Wilhelm Herrich-Schäffer in 1866. It is found on Cuba.

The intensity of pink on the head, patagia and dorsum of the forewings is variable. In some specimens these areas are almost white.
