= Virbia ampla =

Scientific classification
- Kingdom: Animalia
- Phylum: Arthropoda
- Class: Insecta
- Order: Lepidoptera
- Superfamily: Noctuoidea
- Family: Erebidae
- Subfamily: Arctiinae
- Genus: Virbia
- Species: V. ampla

Binomial name
- Virbia ampla (Walker, [1865])

Synonyms
- Terna ampla Walker, [1865]

Species of moth

Virbia ampla is a moth in the family Erebidae. It was described by Francis Walker in 1865. It is found in Mexico.
