= Virbia trigonifera =

Scientific classification
- Domain: Eukaryota
- Kingdom: Animalia
- Phylum: Arthropoda
- Class: Insecta
- Order: Lepidoptera
- Superfamily: Noctuoidea
- Family: Erebidae
- Subfamily: Arctiinae
- Genus: Virbia
- Species: V. trigonifera

Binomial name
- Virbia trigonifera (Schaus, 1901)

Synonyms
- Holomelina trigonifera Schaus, 1901

Species of moth

Virbia trigonifera is a moth in the family Erebidae first described by William Schaus in 1901. It is found in Mexico.
