= Virbia metazonata =

Scientific classification
- Kingdom: Animalia
- Phylum: Arthropoda
- Clade: Pancrustacea
- Class: Insecta
- Order: Lepidoptera
- Superfamily: Noctuoidea
- Family: Erebidae
- Subfamily: Arctiinae
- Genus: Virbia
- Species: V. metazonata

Binomial name
- Virbia metazonata (Hampson, 1901)

Synonyms
- Holomelina metazonata Hampson, 1901

Species of moth

Virbia metazonata is a moth in the family Erebidae. It was described by George Hampson in 1901. It is found in Panama and Colombia.
