= Virbia costata =

Scientific classification
- Kingdom: Animalia
- Phylum: Arthropoda
- Class: Insecta
- Order: Lepidoptera
- Superfamily: Noctuoidea
- Family: Erebidae
- Subfamily: Arctiinae
- Genus: Virbia
- Species: V. costata

Binomial name
- Virbia costata (Stretch, 1884)

Synonyms
- Crocota costata Stretch 1885; Holomelina costata; Crocota opelloides Graef 1887; Crocota intermedia Graef 1887; Crocota parvula Neumögen & Dyar 1893; Eubaphe cocciniceps Schaus 1901; Eubaphe pallipennis Barnes & McDunnough, 1918

Species of moth

Virbia costata is a moth in the family Erebidae. It was described by Richard Harper Stretch in 1884. It is found in the western United States, ranging to western Oklahoma in the east and Colorado in the north.

== Physical Characteristics ==
The length of the forewings is about 11.7 mm for males and 13.5 mm for females. Adults are on wing in July in Arizona, New Mexico, Colorado and Oklahoma. In the Big Bend region of Texas, adults are on wing in June and again in early August.

Larvae have been reared on plantain species.
