= Virbia esula =

Scientific classification
- Domain: Eukaryota
- Kingdom: Animalia
- Phylum: Arthropoda
- Class: Insecta
- Order: Lepidoptera
- Superfamily: Noctuoidea
- Family: Erebidae
- Subfamily: Arctiinae
- Genus: Virbia
- Species: V. esula

Binomial name
- Virbia esula (H. Druce, 1889)

Synonyms
- Brycea esula H. Druce, 1889; Holomelina esula

Species of moth

Virbia esula is a moth in the family Erebidae. It was described by Herbert Druce in 1889. It is found in Mexico.
