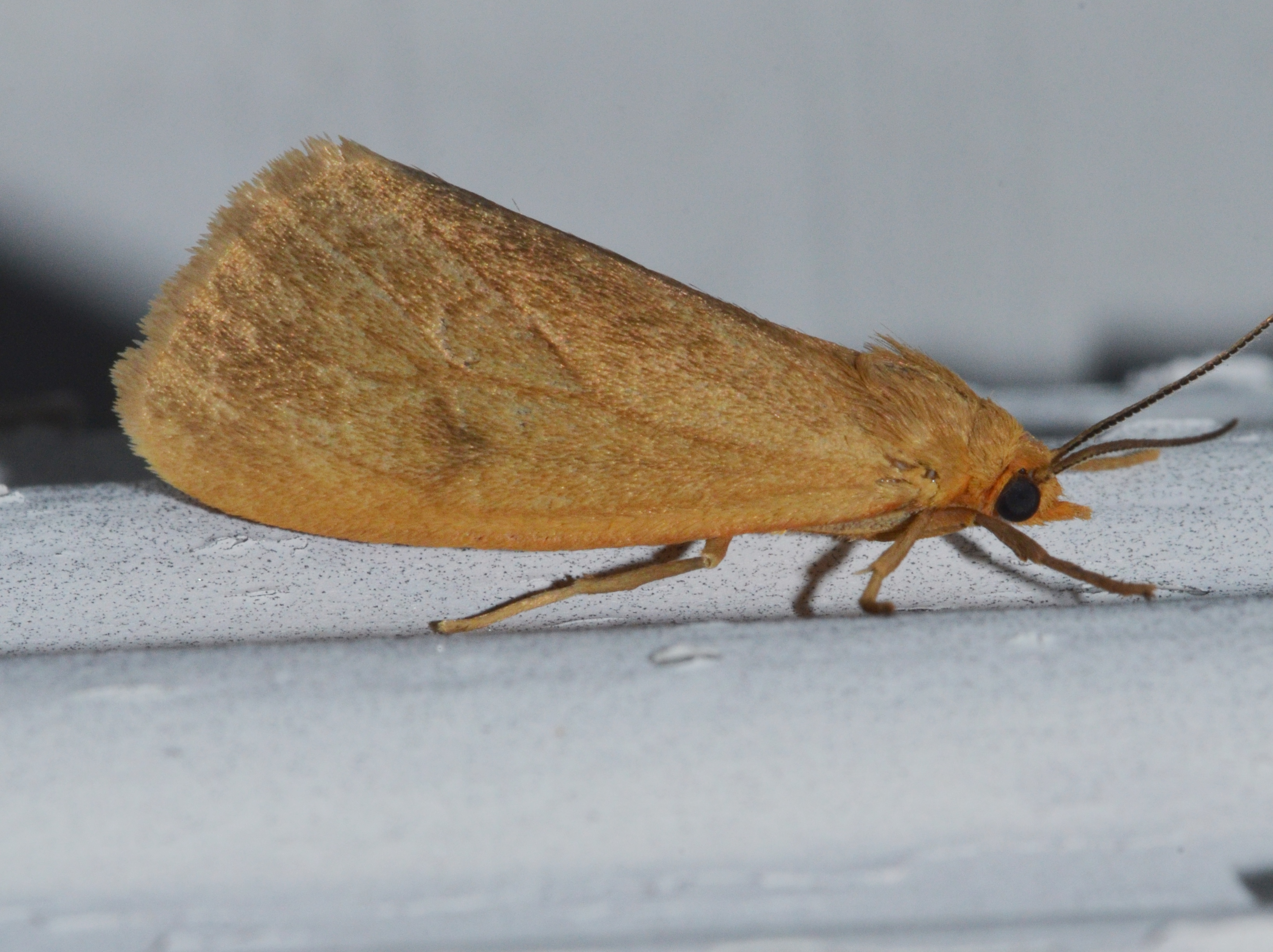

Scientific classification
- Kingdom: Animalia
- Phylum: Arthropoda
- Class: Insecta
- Order: Lepidoptera
- Superfamily: Noctuoidea
- Family: Erebidae
- Subfamily: Arctiinae
- Genus: Virbia
- Species: V. opella

Binomial name
- Virbia opella (Grote, 1863)

Synonyms
- Crocota opella Grote, 1863; Holomelina opella; Crocota flava Barnes & Benjamen, 1925; Crocota obscura Stretch, 1885; Crocota belmaria Ehrmann, 1895; Crocota rubricosta Ehrmann, 1895

= Virbia opella =

Tawny holomelina

Species of moth

Virbia opella, the tawny holomelina, is a moth in the family Erebidae. It was described by Augustus Radcliffe Grote in 1863. It is found in the United States from Maine west to Illinois and south to Texas. The habitat consists of oak forests and scrub oak forests.

The length of the forewings is about 11 mm for males and 12 mm for females. There are multiple generations per year in most of the range. In Louisiana, there are three generations with adults on wing from November to February.

Larvae have been reared on dandelion species.
