= Virbia cetes =

Scientific classification
- Kingdom: Animalia
- Phylum: Arthropoda
- Class: Insecta
- Order: Lepidoptera
- Superfamily: Noctuoidea
- Family: Erebidae
- Subfamily: Arctiinae
- Genus: Virbia
- Species: V. cetes

Binomial name
- Virbia cetes (H. Druce, 1897)

Synonyms
- Brycea cetes H. Druce, 1897; Holomelina cetes

Species of moth

Virbia cetes is a moth in the family Erebidae. It was described by Herbert Druce in 1897. It is found in Mexico.
