= Virbia brevilinea =

Scientific classification
- Kingdom: Animalia
- Phylum: Arthropoda
- Class: Insecta
- Order: Lepidoptera
- Superfamily: Noctuoidea
- Family: Erebidae
- Subfamily: Arctiinae
- Genus: Virbia
- Species: V. brevilinea

Binomial name
- Virbia brevilinea (Walker, 1854)

Synonyms
- Phaeochlaena brevilinea Walker, 1854; Terna major Felder, 1874

Species of moth

Virbia brevilinea is a moth in the family Erebidae. It was described by Francis Walker in 1854. It is found in Brazil.
