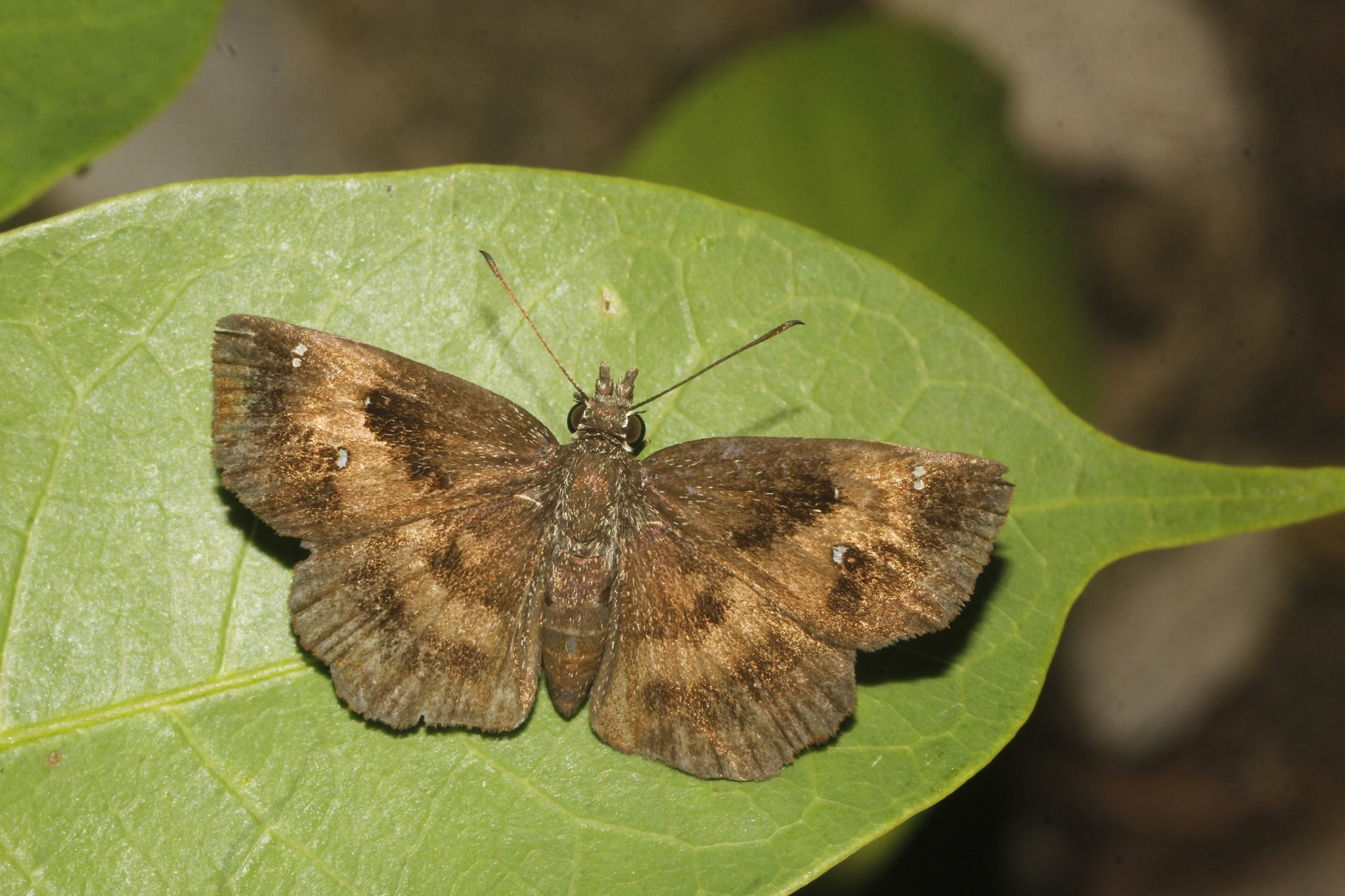

Scientific classification
- Kingdom: Animalia
- Phylum: Arthropoda
- Class: Insecta
- Order: Lepidoptera
- Family: Hesperiidae
- Genus: Staphylus
- Species: S. mazans

Binomial name
- Staphylus mazans (Reakirt, 1867)

= Staphylus mazans =

Species of butterfly

Staphylus mazans, the mazans scallopwing, is a species of spread-wing skipper in the butterfly family Hesperiidae. It is found in Central America and North America.

== Subspecies ==
These four subspecies belong to the species Staphylus mazans:

- Staphylus mazans ascaphalus Staudinger, 1876
- Staphylus mazans hayhurstii Edwards, 1870
- Staphylus mazans mazans
- Staphylus mazans tierra Evans, 1953
