= Virbia schadei =

Scientific classification
- Domain: Eukaryota
- Kingdom: Animalia
- Phylum: Arthropoda
- Class: Insecta
- Order: Lepidoptera
- Superfamily: Noctuoidea
- Family: Erebidae
- Subfamily: Arctiinae
- Genus: Virbia
- Species: V. schadei

Binomial name
- Virbia schadei Jörgensen, 1935

Species of moth

Virbia schadei is a moth in the family Erebidae first described by Peter Jörgensen in 1935. It is found in Paraguay.
