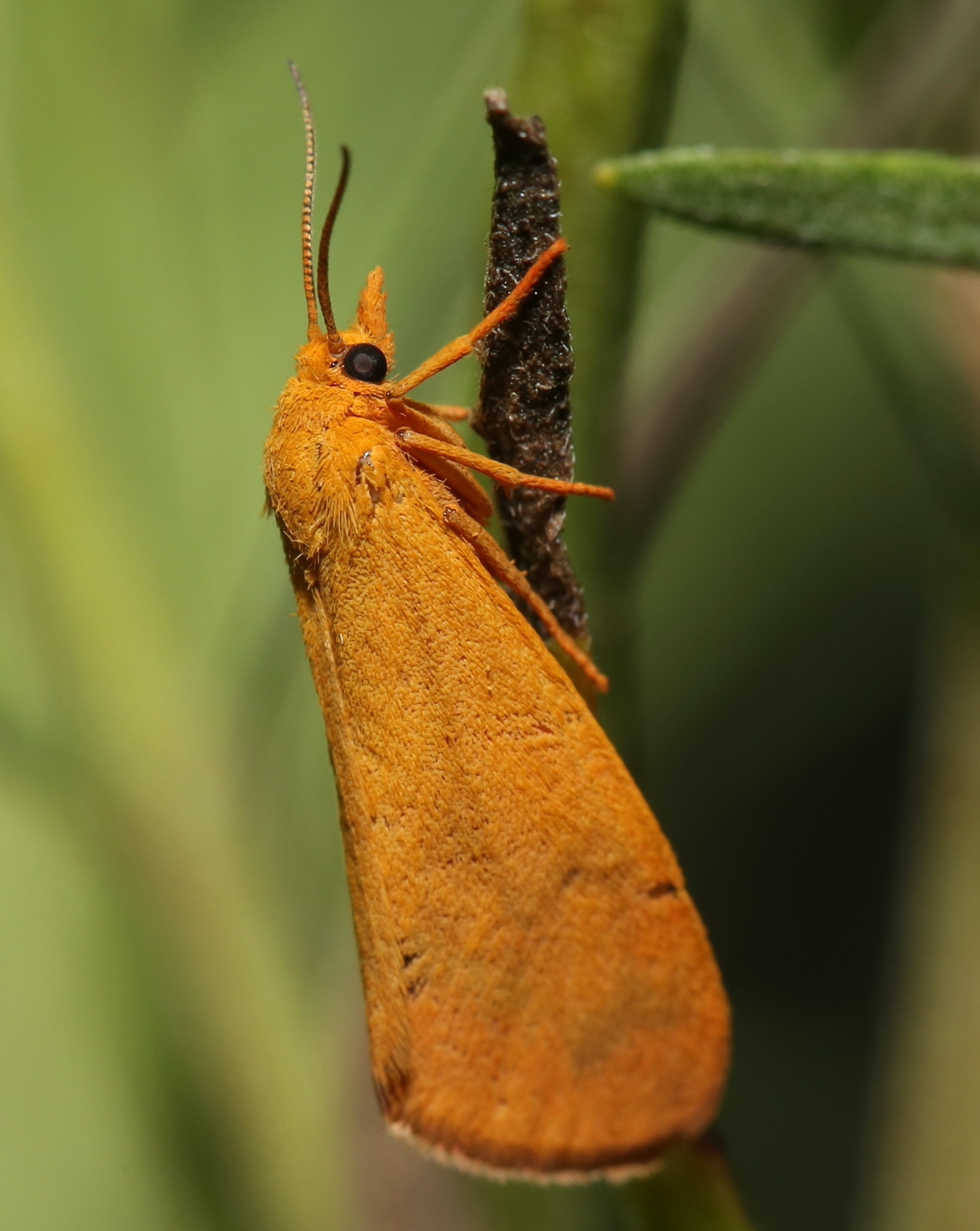

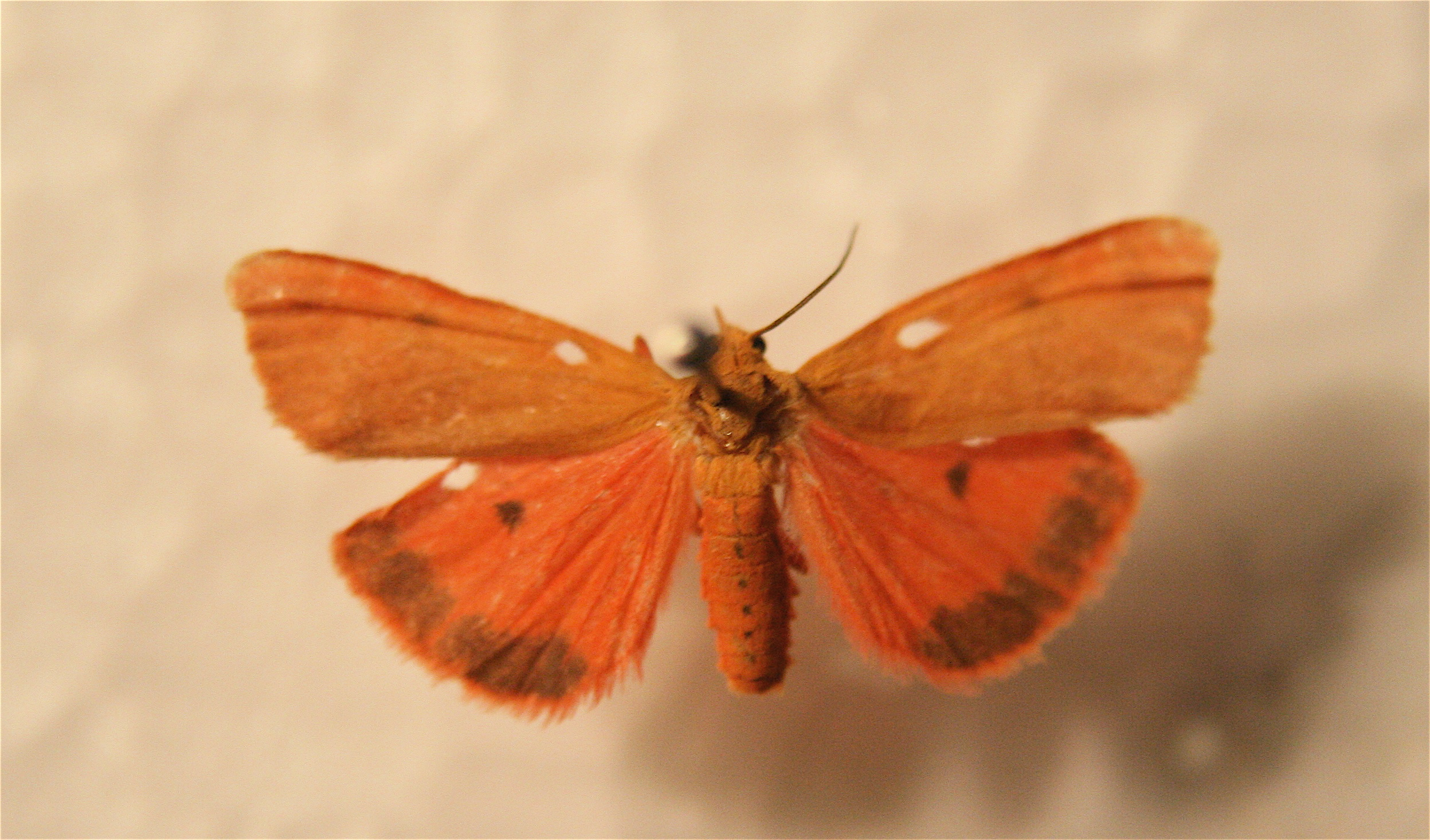

Scientific classification
- Kingdom: Animalia
- Phylum: Arthropoda
- Clade: Pancrustacea
- Class: Insecta
- Order: Lepidoptera
- Superfamily: Noctuoidea
- Family: Erebidae
- Subfamily: Arctiinae
- Genus: Virbia
- Species: V. aurantiaca

Binomial name
- Virbia aurantiaca (Hübner, 1831)

Synonyms
- Eubaphe aurantiaca Hübner, 1827; Holomelina aurantiaca; Crocota bimaculata Saunders, 1869; Crocota brevicornis Walker, 1854; Crocota choriona Reakirt, 1864

= Virbia aurantiaca =

Orange holomelina

Species of moth

Virbia aurantiaca, the orange holomelina, is a moth species of the family Erebidae found in North America. In the east it has been recorded from Manitoba and Nova Scotia, south along the eastern seaboard to Cordoba in Mexico. It has also been recorded from Texas, Mississippi, Missouri, Tennessee, Louisiana, Oklahoma, Kansas, North Dakota and South Dakota.

The length of the forewings is about 10 mm for males and 9.7 mm for females.

Larvae have been reared on dandelion and plantain species.
