= Virbia feronia =

Scientific classification
- Domain: Eukaryota
- Kingdom: Animalia
- Phylum: Arthropoda
- Class: Insecta
- Order: Lepidoptera
- Superfamily: Noctuoidea
- Family: Erebidae
- Subfamily: Arctiinae
- Genus: Virbia
- Species: V. feronia

Binomial name
- Virbia feronia (H. Druce, 1889)

Synonyms
- Brycea feronia H. Druce, 1889; Holomelina feronia

Species of moth

Virbia feronia is a moth in the family Erebidae. It was described by Herbert Druce in 1889. It is found in Mexico.
