= Virbia divisa =

Scientific classification
- Kingdom: Animalia
- Phylum: Arthropoda
- Class: Insecta
- Order: Lepidoptera
- Superfamily: Noctuoidea
- Family: Erebidae
- Subfamily: Arctiinae
- Genus: Virbia
- Species: V. divisa

Binomial name
- Virbia divisa (Walker, 1854)

Synonyms
- Phaeochlaena divisa Walker, 1854

Species of moth

Virbia divisa is a moth in the family Erebidae. It was described by Francis Walker in 1854. It is found in Brazil.
