= Virbia fluminea =

Scientific classification
- Domain: Eukaryota
- Kingdom: Animalia
- Phylum: Arthropoda
- Class: Insecta
- Order: Lepidoptera
- Superfamily: Noctuoidea
- Family: Erebidae
- Subfamily: Arctiinae
- Genus: Virbia
- Species: V. fluminea

Binomial name
- Virbia fluminea Schaus, 1912

Species of moth

Virbia fluminea is a moth in the family Erebidae. It was described by William Schaus in 1912. It is found in Costa Rica.
