= Virbia arbela =

Scientific classification
- Kingdom: Animalia
- Phylum: Arthropoda
- Class: Insecta
- Order: Lepidoptera
- Superfamily: Noctuoidea
- Family: Erebidae
- Subfamily: Arctiinae
- Genus: Virbia
- Species: V. arbela

Binomial name
- Virbia arbela (H. Druce, 1889)

Synonyms
- Brycea arbela H. Druce, 1889; Holomelina arbela

Species of moth

Virbia arbela is a moth in the family Erebidae. It was described by Herbert Druce in 1889. It is found in Mexico.
