= Virbia lamae =

Bog holomelina

Scientific classification
- Domain: Eukaryota
- Kingdom: Animalia
- Phylum: Arthropoda
- Class: Insecta
- Order: Lepidoptera
- Superfamily: Noctuoidea
- Family: Erebidae
- Subfamily: Arctiinae
- Genus: Virbia
- Species: V. lamae

Binomial name
- Virbia lamae (Freeman, 1941)

Synonyms
- Holomelina lamae Freeman, 1941

Species of moth

Virbia lamae, the bog holomelina, is a moth in the family Erebidae. It was described by Thomas Nesbitt Freeman in 1941. It is found in North America in Nova Scotia, New Brunswick, Maine, Wisconsin and Michigan. The habitat consists of open peat bogs.

The length of the forewings is about 10 mm for males and 9.8 mm for females. Adults are on wing in July and early August.

Larvae have been reared on dandelion and plantain species.
