= Virbia ovata =

Scientific classification
- Domain: Eukaryota
- Kingdom: Animalia
- Phylum: Arthropoda
- Class: Insecta
- Order: Lepidoptera
- Superfamily: Noctuoidea
- Family: Erebidae
- Subfamily: Arctiinae
- Genus: Virbia
- Species: V. ovata

Binomial name
- Virbia ovata Rothschild, 1910

Species of moth

Virbia ovata is a moth in the family Erebidae. It was described by Walter Rothschild in 1910. It is found in Santa Catarina, Brazil.
