= Virbia endophaea =

Scientific classification
- Domain: Eukaryota
- Kingdom: Animalia
- Phylum: Arthropoda
- Class: Insecta
- Order: Lepidoptera
- Superfamily: Noctuoidea
- Family: Erebidae
- Subfamily: Arctiinae
- Genus: Virbia
- Species: V. endophaea

Binomial name
- Virbia endophaea Dognin, 1910

Species of moth

Virbia endophaea is a moth in the family Erebidae. It was described by Paul Dognin in 1910. It is found in Bolivia.
