= Virbia fergusoni =

Scientific classification
- Domain: Eukaryota
- Kingdom: Animalia
- Phylum: Arthropoda
- Class: Insecta
- Order: Lepidoptera
- Superfamily: Noctuoidea
- Family: Erebidae
- Subfamily: Arctiinae
- Genus: Virbia
- Species: V. fergusoni

Binomial name
- Virbia fergusoni Zaspel, 2008

Species of moth

Virbia fergusoni is a moth in the family Erebidae. It was described by Jennifer M. Zaspel in 2008. It is found in the south-eastern United States, ranging to South Carolina in the north and from Georgia and northern Florida to Alabama in the west. The habitat consists of mixed oak-pine forests.

The length of the forewings is about 11 mm for males and 12 mm for females. There are probably multiple generations per year with adults recorded on wing from mid-March to mid-July. There is also a single record for September.
