= Virbia ferruginosa =

Rusty holomelina

Scientific classification
- Kingdom: Animalia
- Phylum: Arthropoda
- Class: Insecta
- Order: Lepidoptera
- Superfamily: Noctuoidea
- Family: Erebidae
- Subfamily: Arctiinae
- Genus: Virbia
- Species: V. ferruginosa

Binomial name
- Virbia ferruginosa (Walker, 1854)

Synonyms
- Crocota ferruginosa Walker, 1854; Holomelina ferruginosa; Crocota quinaria Grote, 1863; Crocota trimaculosa Reakirt, 1864; Holomelina buchholzi Wyatt, 1963

Species of moth

Virbia ferruginosa, the rusty holomelina, is a moth in the family Erebidae. It was described by Francis Walker in 1854. It is found from Nova Scotia to British Columbia in Canada. In the United States it is found from the northeast and upper Midwest, south to Virginia, Mississippi, Missouri and Louisiana.

There is one generation per year with adults on wing in July.

Larvae have been reared on dandelion species.
