= Virbia birchi =

Scientific classification
- Kingdom: Animalia
- Phylum: Arthropoda
- Class: Insecta
- Order: Lepidoptera
- Superfamily: Noctuoidea
- Family: Erebidae
- Subfamily: Arctiinae
- Genus: Virbia
- Species: V. birchi

Binomial name
- Virbia birchi H. Druce, 1911

Species of moth

Virbia birchi is a moth in the family Erebidae. It was described by Herbert Druce in 1911. It is found in Trinidad and Colombia.
