= Virbia hypophaea =

Scientific classification
- Kingdom: Animalia
- Phylum: Arthropoda
- Class: Insecta
- Order: Lepidoptera
- Superfamily: Noctuoidea
- Family: Erebidae
- Subfamily: Arctiinae
- Genus: Virbia
- Species: V. hypophaea

Binomial name
- Virbia hypophaea Hampson, 1901

Species of moth

Virbia hypophaea is a moth in the family Erebidae. It was described by George Hampson in 1901. It is found in Costa Rica and Brazil.

== Subspecies ==
- Virbia hypophaea hypophaea (Costa Rica)
- Virbia hypophaea tenuimargo Rothschild, 1922 (Brazil)
