= Virbia satara =

Scientific classification
- Domain: Eukaryota
- Kingdom: Animalia
- Phylum: Arthropoda
- Class: Insecta
- Order: Lepidoptera
- Superfamily: Noctuoidea
- Family: Erebidae
- Subfamily: Arctiinae
- Genus: Virbia
- Species: V. satara

Binomial name
- Virbia satara Seitz, 1919

Species of moth

Virbia satara is a moth in the family Erebidae first described by Adalbert Seitz in 1919. It is found in Bolivia.
