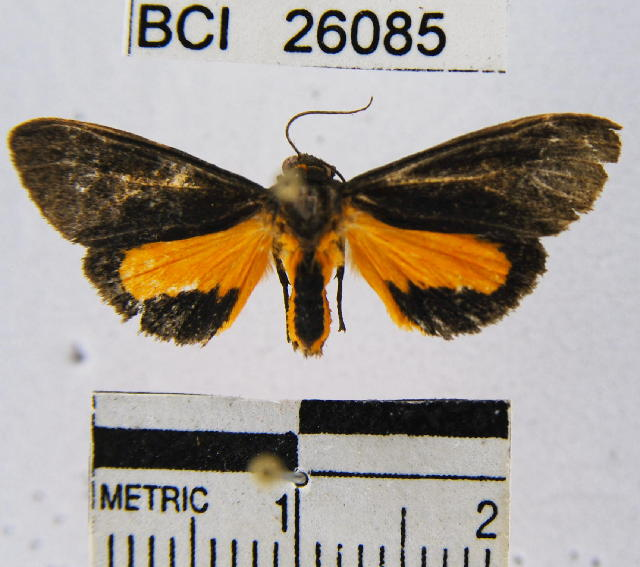

Scientific classification
- Kingdom: Animalia
- Phylum: Arthropoda
- Class: Insecta
- Order: Lepidoptera
- Superfamily: Noctuoidea
- Family: Erebidae
- Subfamily: Arctiinae
- Genus: Virbia
- Species: V. mentiens

Binomial name
- Virbia mentiens Walker, 1854

= Virbia mentiens =

Species of moth

Virbia mentiens is a moth in the family Erebidae. It was described by Francis Walker in 1854. It is found in Venezuela and possibly Costa Rica.
