= Virbia porioni =

Scientific classification
- Kingdom: Animalia
- Phylum: Arthropoda
- Class: Insecta
- Order: Lepidoptera
- Superfamily: Noctuoidea
- Family: Erebidae
- Subfamily: Arctiinae
- Genus: Virbia
- Species: V. porioni

Binomial name
- Virbia porioni Toulgoët, 1983

Species of moth

Virbia porioni is a moth in the family Erebidae first described by Hervé de Toulgoët in 1983. It is found in French Guinea.
