= Virbia marginata =

Scientific classification
- Domain: Eukaryota
- Kingdom: Animalia
- Phylum: Arthropoda
- Class: Insecta
- Order: Lepidoptera
- Superfamily: Noctuoidea
- Family: Erebidae
- Subfamily: Arctiinae
- Genus: Virbia
- Species: V. marginata

Binomial name
- Virbia marginata (H. Druce, 1885)

Synonyms
- Eubaphe marginata H. Druce, 1885; Holomelina marginata

Species of moth

Virbia marginata is a moth in the family Erebidae. It was described by Herbert Druce in 1885. It is found in Mexico, Guatemala, Honduras, New Mexico and Arizona.
