= Virbia subapicalis =

Scientific classification
- Kingdom: Animalia
- Phylum: Arthropoda
- Class: Insecta
- Order: Lepidoptera
- Superfamily: Noctuoidea
- Family: Erebidae
- Subfamily: Arctiinae
- Genus: Virbia
- Species: V. subapicalis

Binomial name
- Virbia subapicalis (Walker, 1854)

Synonyms
- Phaeochlaena subapicalis Walker, 1854; Bepara egaca Walker, [1865]

Species of moth

Virbia subapicalis is a moth in the family Erebidae first described by Francis Walker in 1854. It is found in Brazil, Ecuador, Peru, Guyana, Suriname, Venezuela and Bolivia.
