= Virbia phalangia =

Scientific classification
- Kingdom: Animalia
- Phylum: Arthropoda
- Class: Insecta
- Order: Lepidoptera
- Superfamily: Noctuoidea
- Family: Erebidae
- Subfamily: Arctiinae
- Genus: Virbia
- Species: V. phalangia

Binomial name
- Virbia phalangia Hampson, 1920

Species of moth

Virbia phalangia is a moth in the family Erebidae first described by George Hampson in 1920. It is found in Mexico.
