= Virbia rotundata =

Scientific classification
- Domain: Eukaryota
- Kingdom: Animalia
- Phylum: Arthropoda
- Class: Insecta
- Order: Lepidoptera
- Superfamily: Noctuoidea
- Family: Erebidae
- Subfamily: Arctiinae
- Genus: Virbia
- Species: V. rotundata

Binomial name
- Virbia rotundata Schaus, 1904

Species of moth

Virbia rotundata is a moth in the family Erebidae first described by William Schaus in 1904. It is found in Brazil.
