= Virbia mirma =

Scientific classification
- Domain: Eukaryota
- Kingdom: Animalia
- Phylum: Arthropoda
- Class: Insecta
- Order: Lepidoptera
- Superfamily: Noctuoidea
- Family: Erebidae
- Subfamily: Arctiinae
- Genus: Virbia
- Species: V. mirma

Binomial name
- Virbia mirma (H. Druce, 1897)

Synonyms
- Brycea mirma H. Druce, 1897; Holomelina mirma

Species of moth

Virbia mirma is a moth in the family Erebidae. It was described by Herbert Druce in 1897. It is found in Mexico.
