= Virbia punctata =

Scientific classification
- Domain: Eukaryota
- Kingdom: Animalia
- Phylum: Arthropoda
- Class: Insecta
- Order: Lepidoptera
- Superfamily: Noctuoidea
- Family: Erebidae
- Subfamily: Arctiinae
- Genus: Virbia
- Species: V. punctata

Binomial name
- Virbia punctata H. Druce, 1911

Species of moth

Virbia punctata is a moth in the family Erebidae first described by Herbert Druce in 1911. It is found in Colombia.
