= Virbia affinis =

Scientific classification
- Kingdom: Animalia
- Phylum: Arthropoda
- Class: Insecta
- Order: Lepidoptera
- Superfamily: Noctuoidea
- Family: Erebidae
- Subfamily: Arctiinae
- Genus: Virbia
- Species: V. affinis

Binomial name
- Virbia affinis Rothschild, 1910

Species of moth

Virbia affinis is a moth in the family Erebidae first described by Walter Rothschild in 1910. It is found in Ecuador and Colombia.
