= Virbia palmeri =

Scientific classification
- Domain: Eukaryota
- Kingdom: Animalia
- Phylum: Arthropoda
- Class: Insecta
- Order: Lepidoptera
- Superfamily: Noctuoidea
- Family: Erebidae
- Subfamily: Arctiinae
- Genus: Virbia
- Species: V. palmeri

Binomial name
- Virbia palmeri H. Druce, 1911

Species of moth

Virbia palmeri is a moth in the family Erebidae. It was described by Herbert Druce in 1911. It is found in Colombia.
