= Virbia pomponia =

Scientific classification
- Domain: Eukaryota
- Kingdom: Animalia
- Phylum: Arthropoda
- Class: Insecta
- Order: Lepidoptera
- Superfamily: Noctuoidea
- Family: Erebidae
- Subfamily: Arctiinae
- Genus: Virbia
- Species: V. pomponia

Binomial name
- Virbia pomponia (H. Druce, 1889)

Synonyms
- Ptychoglene pomponia H. Druce, 1889; Holomelina pomponia

Species of moth

Virbia pomponia is a moth in the family Erebidae first described by Herbert Druce in 1889. It is found in Mexico.
