= Virbia cyana =

Scientific classification
- Kingdom: Animalia
- Phylum: Arthropoda
- Class: Insecta
- Order: Lepidoptera
- Superfamily: Noctuoidea
- Family: Erebidae
- Subfamily: Arctiinae
- Genus: Virbia
- Species: V. cyana

Binomial name
- Virbia cyana Dognin, 1909

Synonyms
- Holomelina cyana Dognin, 1909

Species of moth

Virbia cyana is a moth in the family Erebidae. It was described by Paul Dognin in 1909. It is found in Colombia.
