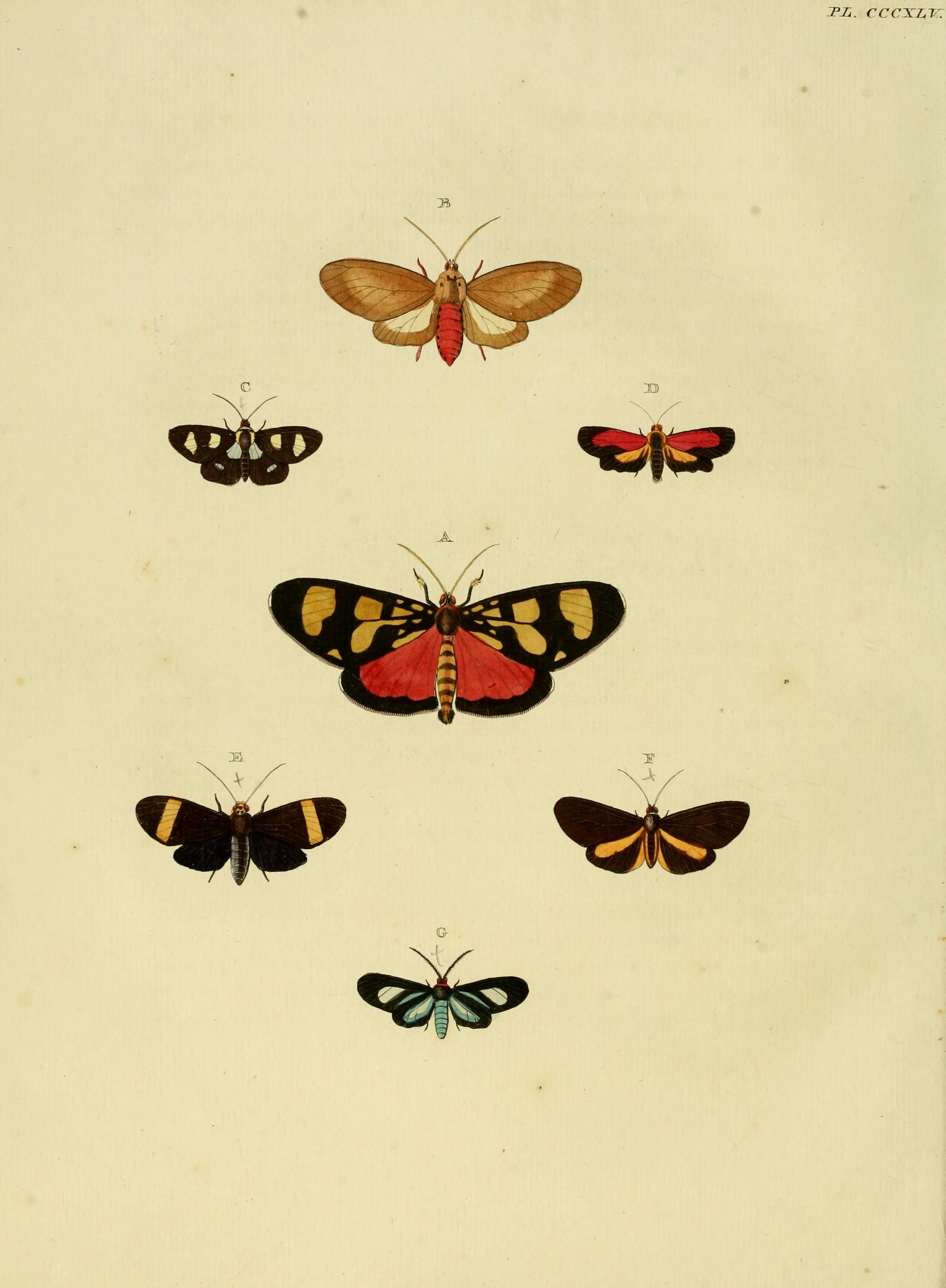
- F: "(Phalaena) Medarda" ( = Virbia medarda (Stoll, [1781]), iconotype?, see Funet). Photos at Barcode of Life.

Scientific classification
- Kingdom: Animalia
- Phylum: Arthropoda
- Clade: Pancrustacea
- Class: Insecta
- Order: Lepidoptera
- Superfamily: Noctuoidea
- Family: Erebidae
- Subfamily: Arctiinae
- Genus: Virbia
- Species: V. medarda

Binomial name
- Virbia medarda (Stoll, [1781])

Synonyms
- Phalaena medarda Stoll, [1781]

= Virbia medarda =

Species of moth

Virbia medarda is a moth in the family Erebidae. It was described by Caspar Stoll in 1781. It is found in Suriname, Guatemala, Panama and Venezuela.
