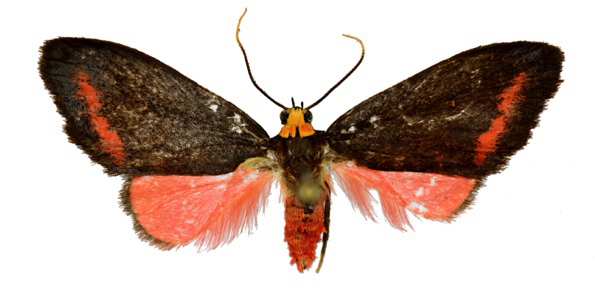

Scientific classification
- Kingdom: Animalia
- Phylum: Arthropoda
- Class: Insecta
- Order: Lepidoptera
- Superfamily: Noctuoidea
- Family: Erebidae
- Subfamily: Arctiinae
- Genus: Boenasa
- Species: B. nigrorosea

Binomial name
- Boenasa nigrorosea Walker, [1865]

= Boenasa nigrorosea =

Species of moth

Boenasa nigrorosea is a moth of the subfamily Arctiinae. It is found on Haiti and the Dominican Republic.
