= Virbia heros =

Scientific classification
- Kingdom: Animalia
- Phylum: Arthropoda
- Class: Insecta
- Order: Lepidoptera
- Superfamily: Noctuoidea
- Family: Erebidae
- Subfamily: Arctiinae
- Genus: Virbia
- Species: V. heros

Binomial name
- Virbia heros (Grote, [1866])

Synonyms
- Crocota heros Grote, [1866]; Holomelina heros

Species of moth

Virbia heros is a moth in the family Erebidae. It was described by Augustus Radcliffe Grote in 1866. It is found on Cuba.
