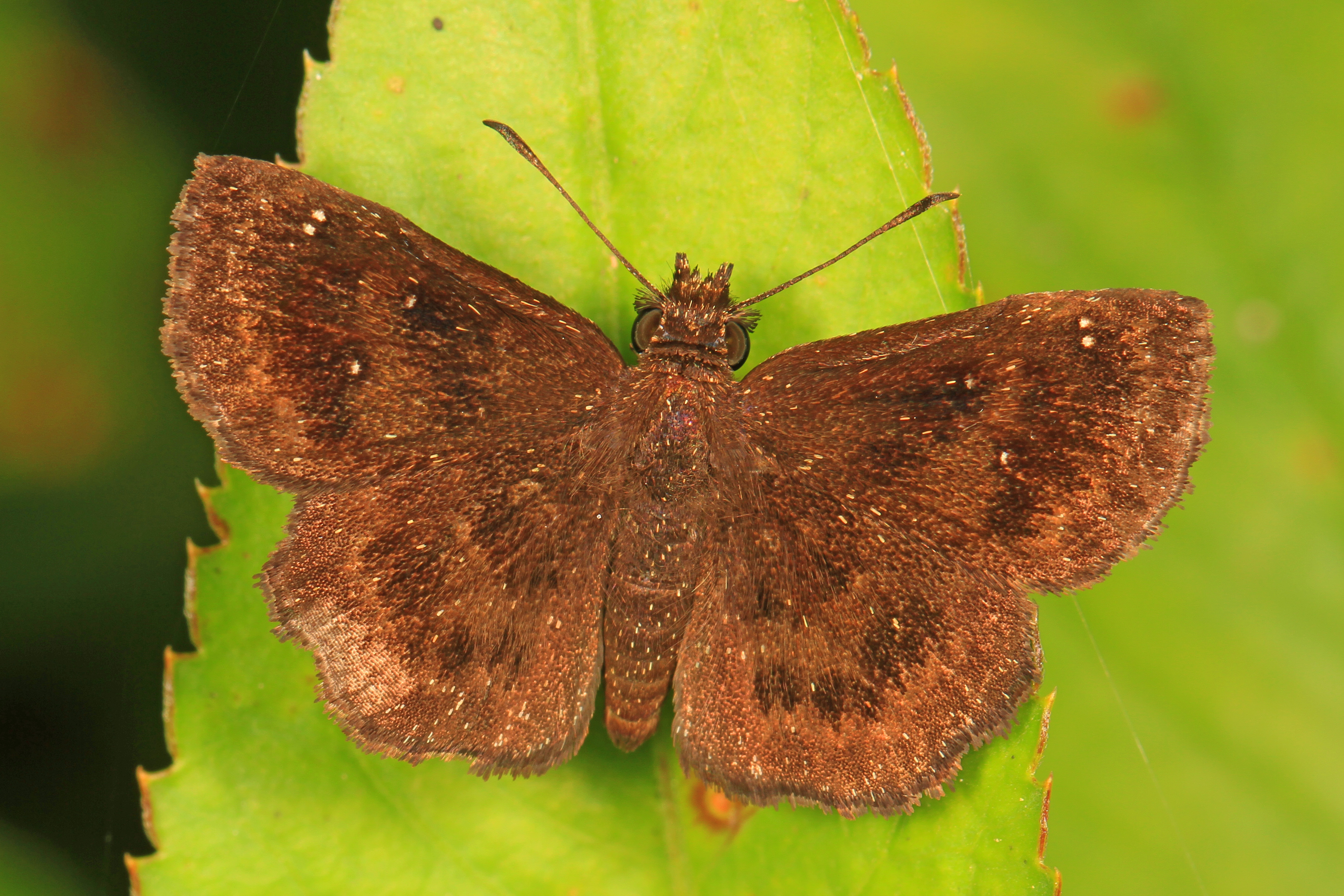

Conservation status
- Secure (NatureServe)

Scientific classification
- Kingdom: Animalia
- Phylum: Arthropoda
- Class: Insecta
- Order: Lepidoptera
- Family: Hesperiidae
- Genus: Staphylus
- Species: S. hayhurstii

Binomial name
- Staphylus hayhurstii (Edwards, 1870)

Synonyms
- Hesperia hayhurstii Edwards, 1870; Pholisora hayhurstii

= Staphylus hayhurstii =

Species of butterfly

Staphylus hayhurstii, commonly known as Hayhurst's scallopwing, is a species of butterfly in the family Hesperiidae. It is found in the United States from eastern Nebraska east across the southern Midwest to southern Pennsylvania and south to Florida, the Gulf states and central Texas.

The wingspan is 25–32 mm. There are two generations with adults on the wing from May to August in most of its range, from April to September in Mississippi and from February to December in Florida.

The larvae feed on Chenopodium, and occasionally Alternanthera species. The adults feed on nectar from marigold, knotweed, spearmint, wild marjoram, cucumber, dogbane, white sweet clover, and white clover.
