= Virbia rindgei =

Scientific classification
- Domain: Eukaryota
- Kingdom: Animalia
- Phylum: Arthropoda
- Class: Insecta
- Order: Lepidoptera
- Superfamily: Noctuoidea
- Family: Erebidae
- Subfamily: Arctiinae
- Genus: Virbia
- Species: V. rindgei

Binomial name
- Virbia rindgei Cardé, 2008

Species of moth

Virbia rindgei is a moth in the family Erebidae. It is found in Colorado, South Dakota and Wyoming. The habitat consists of ponderosa pine forests.

The length of the forewings is about 12 mm for males and females. The male forewings are brown with a faint sepia discal spot. The hindwings are peach red with a band of sepia in the subterminal region. The female forewings are brown with a faint brown discal spot. The hindwings are peach red with a band of sepia scales in the subterminal region. There is probably one generation per year, with adults on wing from mid to late July.

== Etymology ==
The species is named in honour of Dr. Fred Rindge.
