= Virbia mathani =

Scientific classification
- Domain: Eukaryota
- Kingdom: Animalia
- Phylum: Arthropoda
- Class: Insecta
- Order: Lepidoptera
- Superfamily: Noctuoidea
- Family: Erebidae
- Subfamily: Arctiinae
- Genus: Virbia
- Species: V. mathani

Binomial name
- Virbia mathani (Rothschild, 1910)

Synonyms
- Holomelina mathani Rothschild, 1910

Species of moth

Virbia mathani is a moth in the family Erebidae. It was described by Walter Rothschild in 1910. It is found in Colombia.
