= Virbia lunulata =

Scientific classification
- Domain: Eukaryota
- Kingdom: Animalia
- Phylum: Arthropoda
- Class: Insecta
- Order: Lepidoptera
- Superfamily: Noctuoidea
- Family: Erebidae
- Subfamily: Arctiinae
- Genus: Virbia
- Species: V. lunulata

Binomial name
- Virbia lunulata (Herrich-Schäffer, 1855)

Synonyms
- Holomelina lunulata Herrich-Schäffer, [1855]

Species of moth

Virbia lunulata is a moth in the family Erebidae. It was described by Gottlieb August Wilhelm Herrich-Schäffer in 1855. The type's location is unknown.
