= Virbia latus =

Scientific classification
- Kingdom: Animalia
- Phylum: Arthropoda
- Class: Insecta
- Order: Lepidoptera
- Superfamily: Noctuoidea
- Family: Erebidae
- Subfamily: Arctiinae
- Genus: Virbia
- Species: V. latus

Binomial name
- Virbia latus (Grote, [1866])

Synonyms
- Cytorus latus Grote, [1866]; Holomelina lata Hampson, 1901; Holomelina latus

Species of moth

Virbia latus is a moth in the family Erebidae. It was described by Augustus Radcliffe Grote in 1866. It is found on Cuba.
