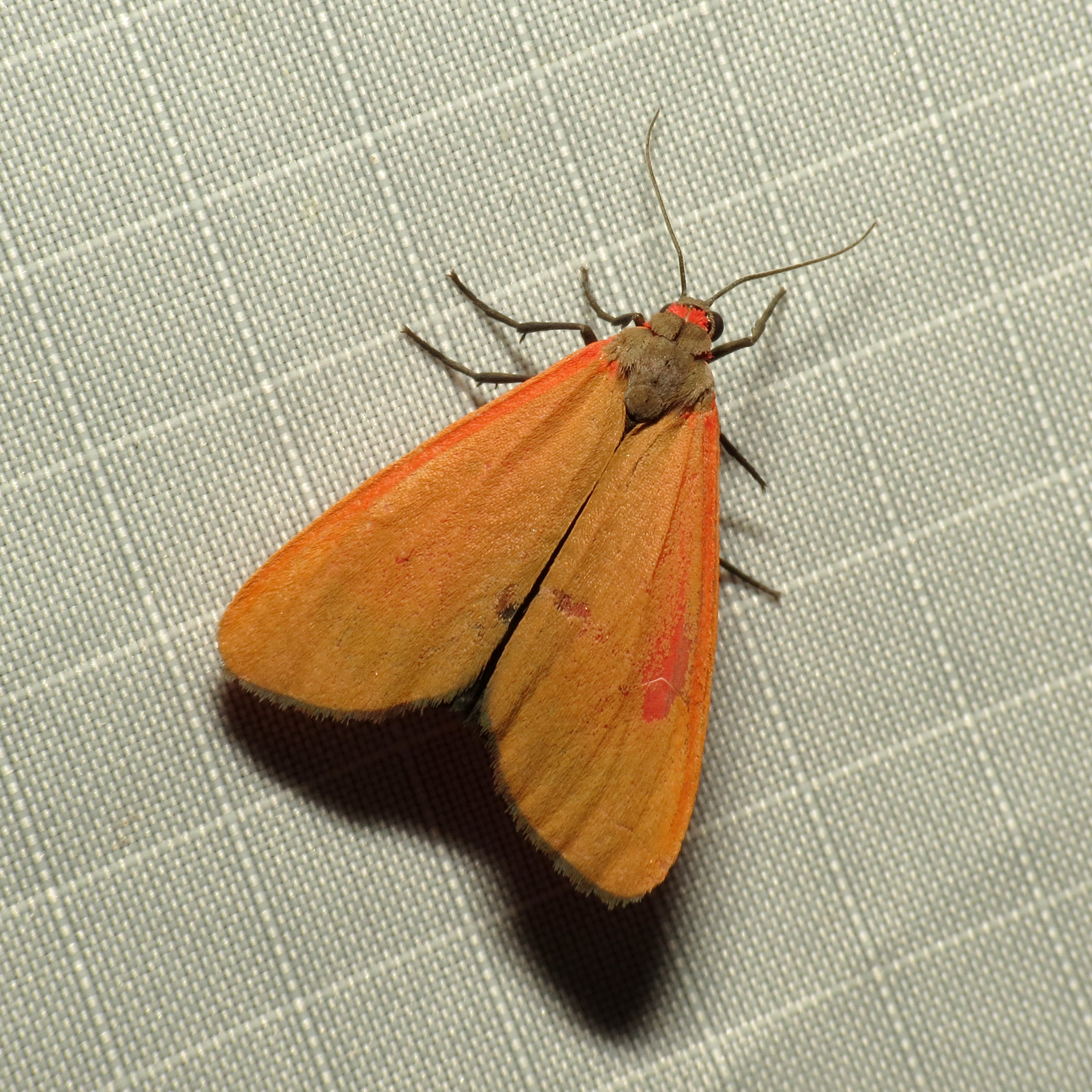

Scientific classification
- Domain: Eukaryota
- Kingdom: Animalia
- Phylum: Arthropoda
- Class: Insecta
- Order: Lepidoptera
- Superfamily: Noctuoidea
- Family: Erebidae
- Subfamily: Arctiinae
- Genus: Virbia
- Species: V. ostenta

Binomial name
- Virbia ostenta (H. Edwards, 1881)

Synonyms
- Crocota ostenta H. Edwards, 1881; Holomelina ostenta; Holomelina calera Barnes, 1907

= Virbia ostenta =

Showy holomelina

Species of moth

Virbia ostenta, the showy holomelina, is a moth in the family Erebidae. It was described by Henry Edwards in 1881. It is found in the mountain ranges of New Mexico, Arizona and Mexico.

The length of the forewings is about 17.1 mm for males and 18.5 mm for females.

Larvae have been reared on dandelion species and Lactuca floridana.
