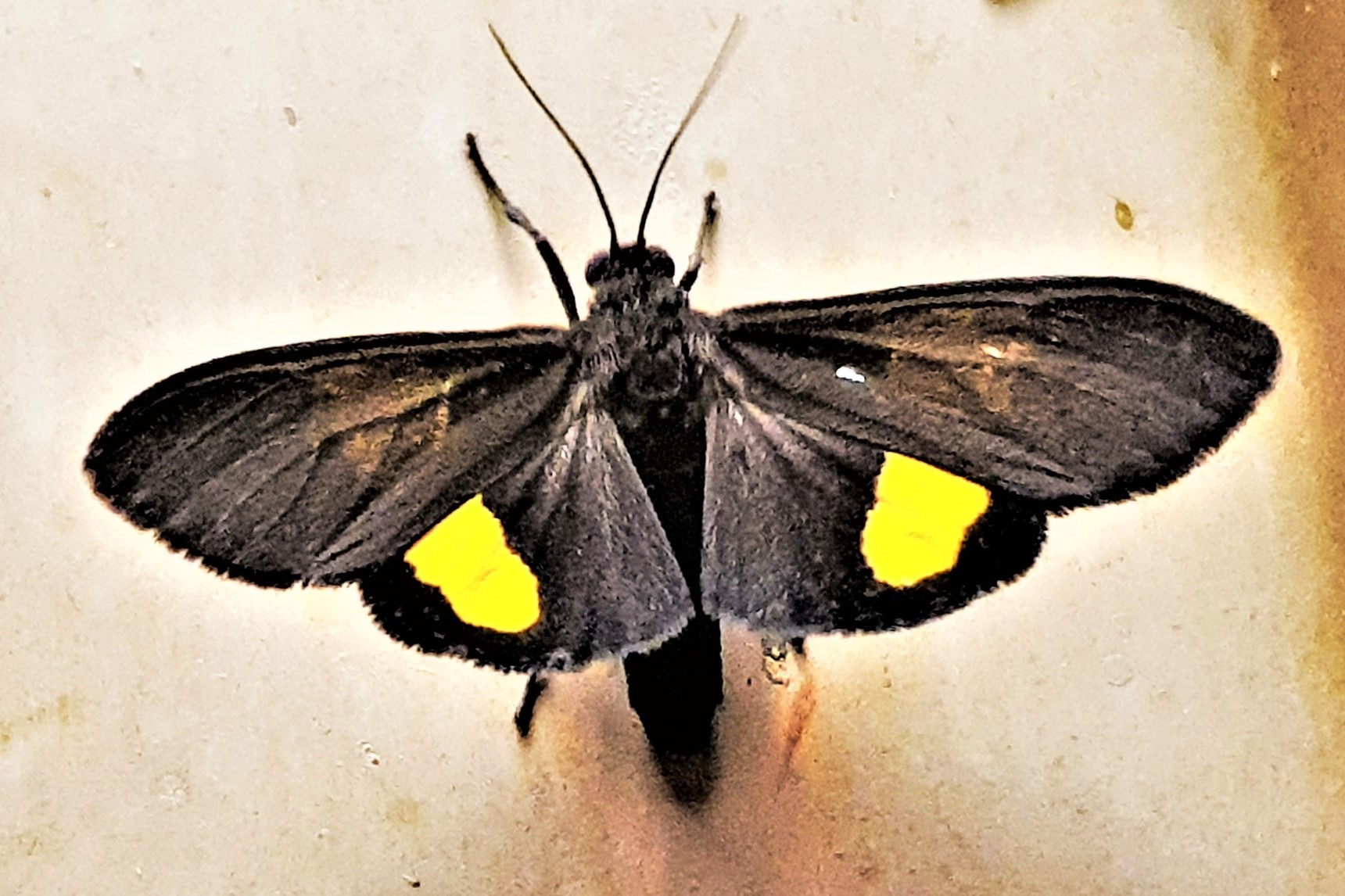

Scientific classification
- Kingdom: Animalia
- Phylum: Arthropoda
- Clade: Pancrustacea
- Class: Insecta
- Order: Lepidoptera
- Superfamily: Noctuoidea
- Family: Erebidae
- Subfamily: Arctiinae
- Genus: Virbia
- Species: V. orola

Binomial name
- Virbia orola Dyar, 1914

= Virbia orola =

Species of moth

Virbia orola is a species of moth in the family Erebidae. It was first described by Harrison Gray Dyar Jr. in 1914. It is found in Panama.
