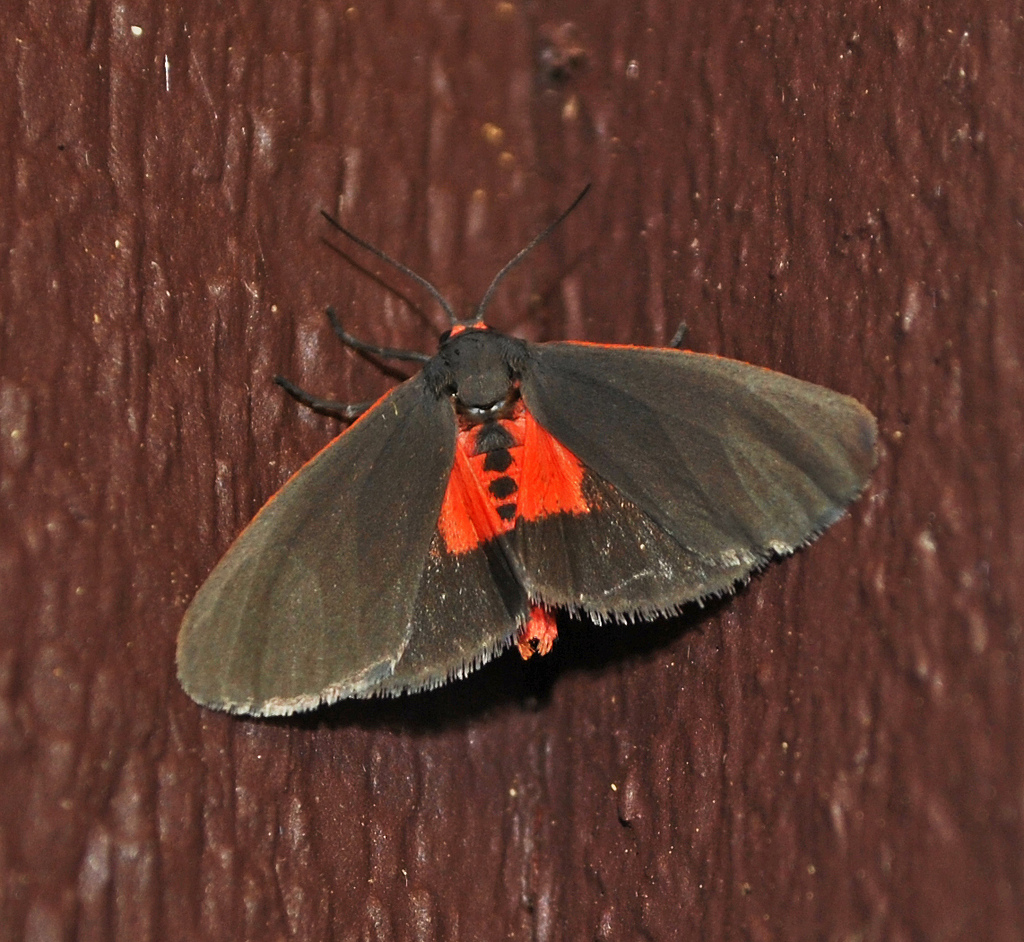
- Virbia laeta

Scientific classification
- Kingdom: Animalia
- Phylum: Arthropoda
- Class: Insecta
- Order: Lepidoptera
- Superfamily: Noctuoidea
- Family: Erebidae
- Subfamily: Arctiinae
- Subtribe: Arctiina
- Genus: Virbia; Walker, 1854

Synonyms
- Holomelina Herrich-Schäffer, 1855; Bepara Walker, [1865]; Terna Walker, [1865]; Cathocida Hampson, 1901; Cothocida Walker, 1865; Cytorus Grote, 1866

= Virbia =

Genus of moths

Virbia is a genus of tiger moths in the family Erebidae. The genus was erected by Francis Walker in 1854.

== Species ==
- Virbia affinis Rothschild, 1910
- Virbia ampla (Walker, [1865])
- Virbia arbela (H. Druce, 1889)
- Virbia aurantiaca (Hübner, [1831])
- Virbia birchi H. Druce, 1911
- Virbia brevilinea (Walker, 1854)
- Virbia catama Dyar, 1913
- Virbia cetes (H. Druce, 1897)
- Virbia costata (Stretch, 1884)
- Virbia cyana Dognin, 1909
- Virbia disparilis (Grote, [1866])
- Virbia divisa (Walker, 1854)
- Virbia dotata (Walker, [1865])
- Virbia elisca Dyar, 1913
- Virbia endomelaena Dognin, 1914
- Virbia endophaea Dognin, 1910
- Virbia epione H. Druce, 1911
- Virbia esula (H. Druce, 1889)
- Virbia fasciata Rothschild, 1910
- Virbia fergusoni Zaspel 2008
- Virbia feronia (H. Druce, 1889)
- Virbia ferruginosa (Walker, 1854)
- Virbia flavifurca Hampson, 1916
- Virbia flemmingi Rothschild, 1910
- Virbia fluminea Schaus, 1912
- Virbia fragilis (Strecker, 1878)
- Virbia heros (Grote, [1866])
- Virbia hypophaea Hampson, 1901
- Virbia immaculata (Reakirt, 1864)
- Virbia laeta (Guérin-Méneville, 1844)
- Virbia lamae (Freeman, 1941)
- Virbia latus (Grote, [1866])
- Virbia lehmanni Rothschild, 1910
- Virbia lunulata Herrich-Schäffer, 1855
- Virbia luteilinea Walker, 1854
- Virbia marginata (H. Druce, 1885)
- Virbia mathani Rothschild, 1910
- Virbia medarda (Stoll, [1781])
- Virbia mentiens Walker, 1854
- Virbia metazonata Hampson, 1901
- Virbia minuta (Felder, 1874)
- Virbia mirma (H. Druce, 1897)
- Virbia nigricans (Reakirt, 1864)
- Virbia opella (Grote, 1863)
- Virbia orola Dyar, 1914
- Virbia ostenta (H. Edwards, 1881)
- Virbia ovata Rothschild, 1910
- Virbia pallicornis (Grote, 1867)
- Virbia palmeri H. Druce, 1911
- Virbia pamphylia (H. Druce, 1889)
- Virbia parva Schaus, 1892
- Virbia phalangia Hampson, 1920
- Virbia polyphron (H. Druce, 1894)
- Virbia pomponia (H. Druce, 1889)
- Virbia porioni Toulgoët, 1983
- Virbia punctata H. Druce, 1911
- Virbia rindgei Cardé 2008
- Virbia rogersi (H. Druce, 1885)
- Virbia rosenbergi Rothschild, 1910
- Virbia rotundata Schaus, 1904
- Virbia rubicundaria (Hübner, [1831])
- Virbia sanguicollis Hampson, 1901
- Virbia satara Seitz, 1919
- Virbia schadei Jörgensen, 1935
- Virbia semirosea (H. Druce, 1889)
- Virbia strigata Rothschild, 1910
- Virbia subapicalis (Walker, 1854)
- Virbia tenuicincta Hampson, 1901
- Virbia thersites H. Druce, 1885
- Virbia trigonifera Schaus, 1901
- Virbia underwoodi H. Druce, 1911
- Virbia varians Schaus, 1892
- Virbia xanthopleura (Hampson, 1898)
- Virbia zonata (Felder, 1874)
