= Virbia fragilis =

Scientific classification
- Domain: Eukaryota
- Kingdom: Animalia
- Phylum: Arthropoda
- Class: Insecta
- Order: Lepidoptera
- Superfamily: Noctuoidea
- Family: Erebidae
- Subfamily: Arctiinae
- Genus: Virbia
- Species: V. fragilis

Binomial name
- Virbia fragilis (Strecker, 1878)

Synonyms
- Crocota fragilis Strecker, 1878; Holomelina fragilis

Species of moth

Virbia fragilis is a moth in the family Erebidae. It was described by Strecker in 1878. It is found in open fields in the Black Hills in South Dakota and in Boulder, Colorado. The range extends north to Alberta and British Columbia and south to New Mexico.
