= Virbia flavifurca =

Scientific classification
- Kingdom: Animalia
- Phylum: Arthropoda
- Class: Insecta
- Order: Lepidoptera
- Superfamily: Noctuoidea
- Family: Erebidae
- Subfamily: Arctiinae
- Genus: Virbia
- Species: V. flavifurca

Binomial name
- Virbia flavifurca Hampson, 1916

Species of moth

Virbia flavifurca is a moth in the family Erebidae first described by George Hampson in 1916. It is found in Venezuela.
