= Virbia zonata =

Scientific classification
- Domain: Eukaryota
- Kingdom: Animalia
- Phylum: Arthropoda
- Class: Insecta
- Order: Lepidoptera
- Superfamily: Noctuoidea
- Family: Erebidae
- Subfamily: Arctiinae
- Genus: Virbia
- Species: V. zonata

Binomial name
- Virbia zonata (Felder & Rogenhofer, 1874)

Synonyms
- Terna zonata Felder, 1874; Josiodes distincta H. Edwards, 1884

Species of moth

Virbia zonata is a moth in the family Erebidae first described by Felder and Rogenhofer in 1874. It is found in Mexico.
