= Virbia pallicornis =

Scientific classification
- Kingdom: Animalia
- Phylum: Arthropoda
- Clade: Pancrustacea
- Class: Insecta
- Order: Lepidoptera
- Superfamily: Noctuoidea
- Family: Erebidae
- Subfamily: Arctiinae
- Genus: Virbia
- Species: V. pallicornis

Binomial name
- Virbia pallicornis (Grote, 1867)

Synonyms
- Crocota pallicornis Grote, 1867; Holomelina pallicornis

Species of moth

Virbia pallicornis is a moth in the family Erebidae. It was described by Augustus Radcliffe Grote in 1867. It is found on Cuba.
