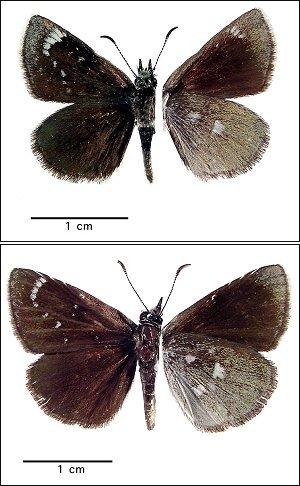

Scientific classification
- Kingdom: Animalia
- Phylum: Arthropoda
- Class: Insecta
- Order: Lepidoptera
- Family: Hesperiidae
- Genus: Hesperopsis
- Species: H. libya

Binomial name
- Hesperopsis libya (Scudder, 1878)

Synonyms
- Heteropterus libya Scudder, 1878; Pholisora libya; Ancyloxypha lena Edwards, 1882

= Hesperopsis libya =

Species of butterfly

Hesperopsis libya, the Mojave sootywing, Mohave sootywing, Great Basin sootywing or Lena sooty wing, is a butterfly of the family Hesperiidae. It is found in North America from eastern Oregon east to Montana and south to southern California, Arizona, and north-western Mexico including Baja California. Its habitats include alkalai flats, sagebrush desert, desert hills, shale barrens, watercourses, and ravines.

The wingspan is 22–32 mm. Adults are on wing from July to August in one generation per year in North Dakota and Montana. In Colorado, there are two generations with adults on wing from June to August while adult are on wing from March to October in multiple generations in California. Adults feed on flower nectar.

The larvae feed on the leaves of Atriplex canescens and A. confertifolia. They live in nests of leaves tied together with silk.

== Subspecies ==
- Hesperopsis libya libya (Arizona)
- Hesperopsis libya lena (Edwards, 1882)
- Hesperopsis libya joaquina Emmel, Emmel & Mattoon, 1998 (California)
