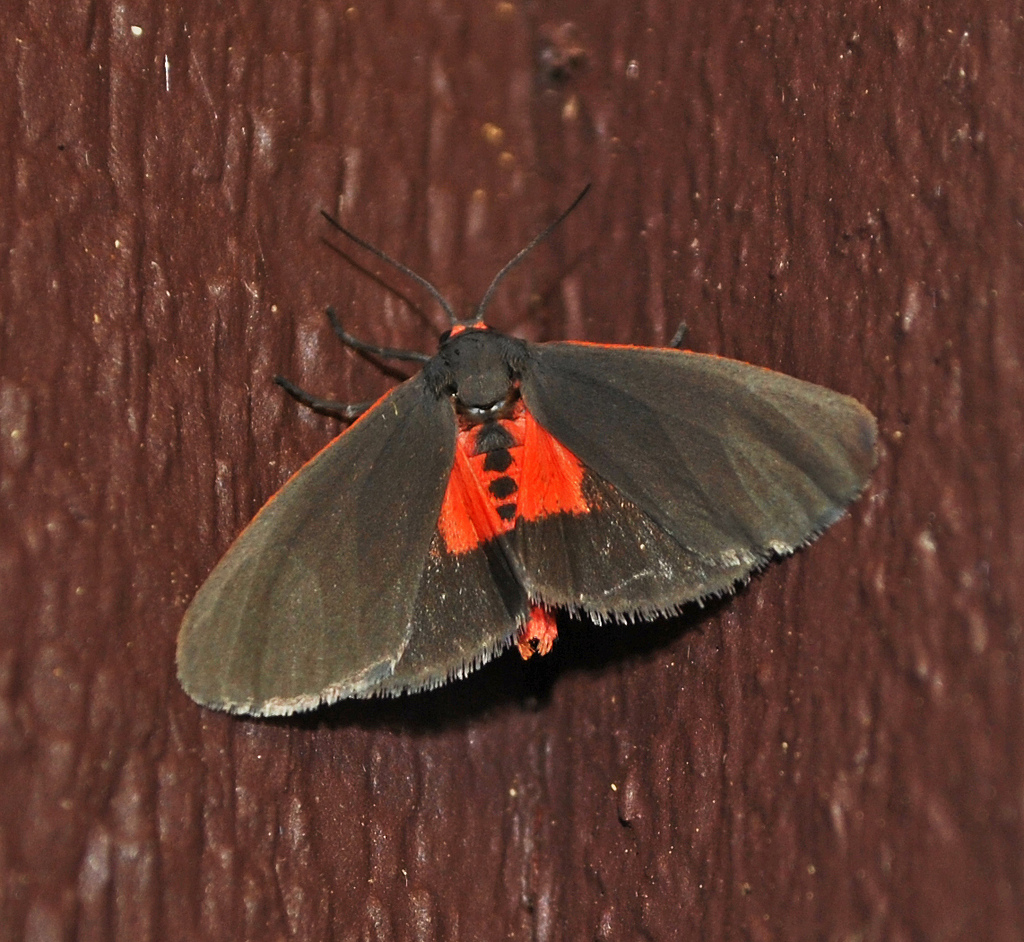

Scientific classification
- Kingdom: Animalia
- Phylum: Arthropoda
- Clade: Pancrustacea
- Class: Insecta
- Order: Lepidoptera
- Superfamily: Noctuoidea
- Family: Erebidae
- Subfamily: Arctiinae
- Genus: Virbia
- Species: V. laeta

Binomial name
- Virbia laeta (Guérin-Méneville, 1844)

Synonyms
- Lithosia laeta Guérin-Méneville, [1832]; Holomelina laeta; Crocota treatii Grote, 1865; Lithosia rubropicta Packard, 1887

= Virbia laeta =

Joyful holomelina

Species of moth

Virbia laeta, the joyful holomelina, is a moth in the family Erebidae. It was described by Félix Édouard Guérin-Méneville in 1844. It is found in North America from New Brunswick south to Florida and west to Minnesota and south to Texas. The habitat consists of pine woodlands.

The length of the forewings is about 11 mm for males and 17 mm for females. In Louisiana, adults have been recorded on wing year round (except December). In Texas, there are two generations per year with adults on wing in March and June. In the northern parts of the range, there seems to be one generation per year, with adults on wing in June and July.

Larvae have been reared on dandelion and plantain species.
