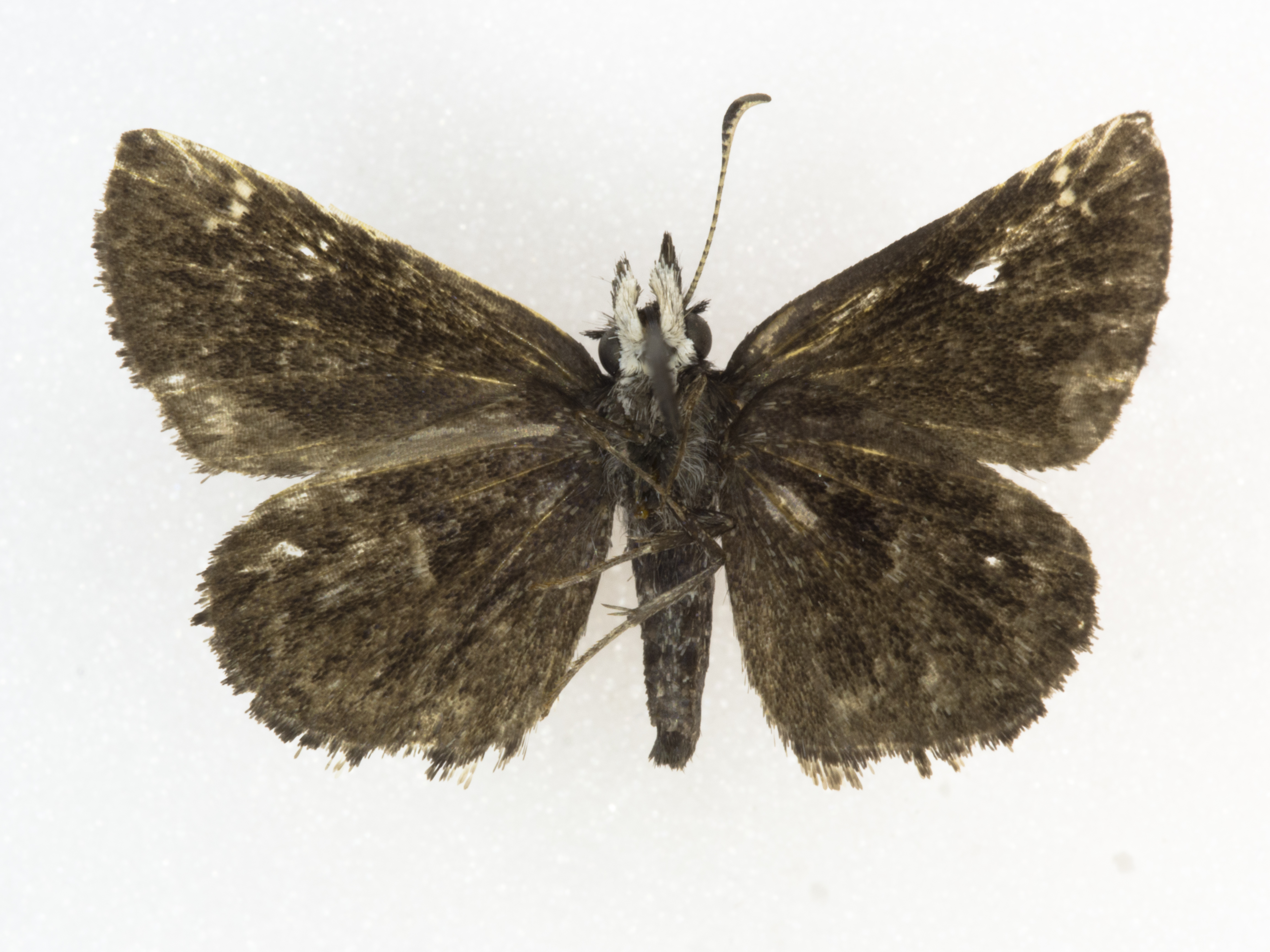

Scientific classification
- Kingdom: Animalia
- Phylum: Arthropoda
- Clade: Pancrustacea
- Class: Insecta
- Order: Lepidoptera
- Family: Hesperiidae
- Genus: Hesperopsis
- Species: H. alpheus

Binomial name
- Hesperopsis alpheus (W. H. Edwards, 1876)

= Hesperopsis alpheus =

Species of butterfly

Hesperopsis alpheus, the saltbush sootywing, is a species of spread-wing skipper in the butterfly family Hesperiidae. It is found in Central America and North America.

== Subspecies ==
These three subspecies belong to the species Hesperopsis alpheus:

- Hesperopsis alpheus alpheus (W. H. Edwards, 1876)
- Hesperopsis alpheus oricus (W. H. Edwards, 1879)
- Hesperopsis alpheus texana Scott, 1981
