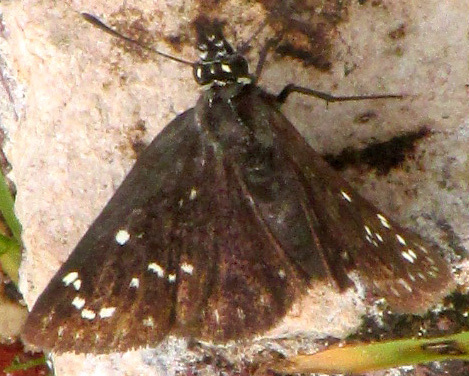

Conservation status
- Apparently Secure (NatureServe)

Scientific classification
- Kingdom: Animalia
- Phylum: Arthropoda
- Clade: Pancrustacea
- Class: Insecta
- Order: Lepidoptera
- Family: Hesperiidae
- Genus: Pholisora
- Species: P. mejicanus

Binomial name
- Pholisora mejicanus Reakirt, 1866

Synonyms
- Nisoniades mejicanus Reakirt 1866

= Pholisora mejicanus =

Species of butterfly

Pholisora mejicanus is a species of butterfly of the skipper family, the Hesperiidae. It occurs in the Southwestern United States south throughout most of Mexico. Often it is referred to as the Mexican sootywing.

== Description ==
As is typical in the skipper family, Mexican sootywings, Pholisora mejicanus, commonly are seen "skipping" fast from one spot to another. Their rapid, darting flight is right for their stout bodies, which are small to medium-size relative to other butterfly species. Their heads are relatively broad, with widely separated eyes and antennae. Their antennae are distinctively hooked or recurved at their tips. Many skipper species, including the Mexican sootywing, rest with their wings held at different angles, which is unlike moths, who rest with their wings spread flat; also it's unlike most resting butterflies who fold their wings directly above their bodies.

In the field, when seen from above, Mexican sootywings are black skippers with white dots arranged in a specific pattern. Seen from the side, the hindwing's underside is blue-gray with contrasting black veins. To distinguish Mexican sootywings from other Pholisora species, the pattern of dots on the wings' tops is less useful than noting the Mexican sootywing's blue-gray hindwing's underside, with those contrasting black veins.

== Habitat ==
Mexican sootywings like open areas such as disturbed roadsides and along railways, as well as mountainous gulches and canyons.

== Caterpillar hosts ==
Mexican sootywing caterpillars feed on amaranths and Chenopodium species, both taxa belonging to the amaranth family.

== Distribution ==
In the US, Pholisora mejicanus apparently is restricted to the eastern foothills of the Rocky Mountains from southern Colorado south into Mexico In Mexico, the species occurs from western Texas's southern border south in the highlands into Oaxaca state in southern Mexico.

Much of the Mexican sootywing's distribution covers the same area as that of the more common and similar looking common sootywing, Pholisora catullus. In New Mexico, despite occurring in the same general area, the two species rarely occur together but, when they do, they don't interbreed. Their larvae can even occur on the same plant. Genetic studies confirm that during the species' evolution they've remained independent species for a long time, though it remains unclear how this can be.
