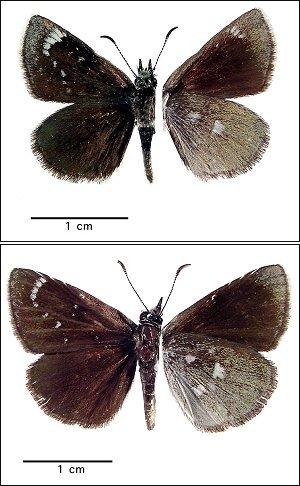
- Hesperopsis libya

Scientific classification
- Kingdom: Animalia
- Phylum: Arthropoda
- Class: Insecta
- Order: Lepidoptera
- Family: Hesperiidae
- Tribe: Carcharodini
- Genus: Hesperopsis; Dyar, 1905

= Hesperopsis =

Genus of butterflies

Hesperopsis is a genus of butterflies in the skipper family, Hesperiidae.

Species include:

- Hesperopsis alpheus (Edwards, 1876)
- Hesperopsis gracielae (MacNeill, 1970)
- Hesperopsis libya (Scudder, 1878)
