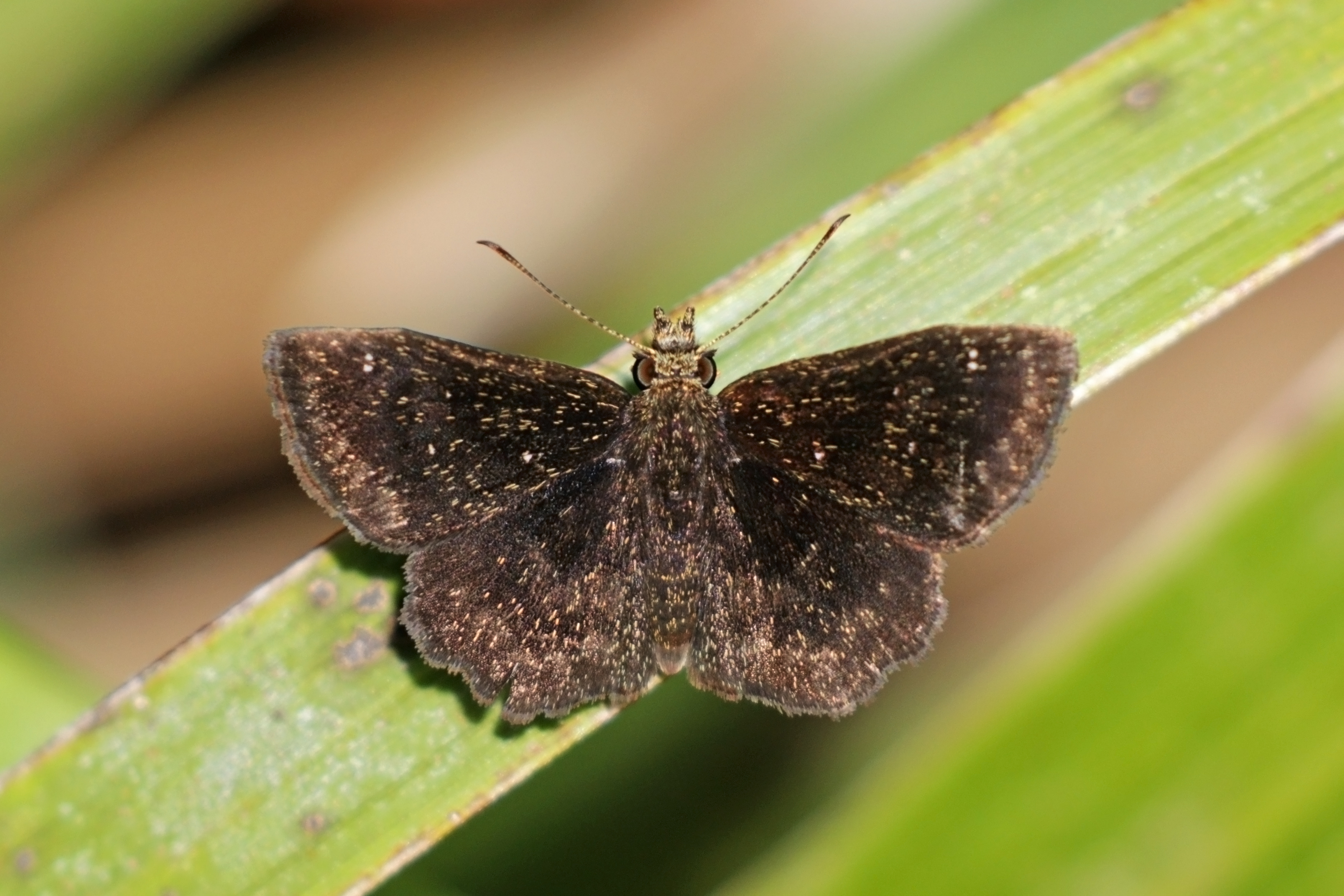
- Central American sootywing (Staphylus ascalaphus) female
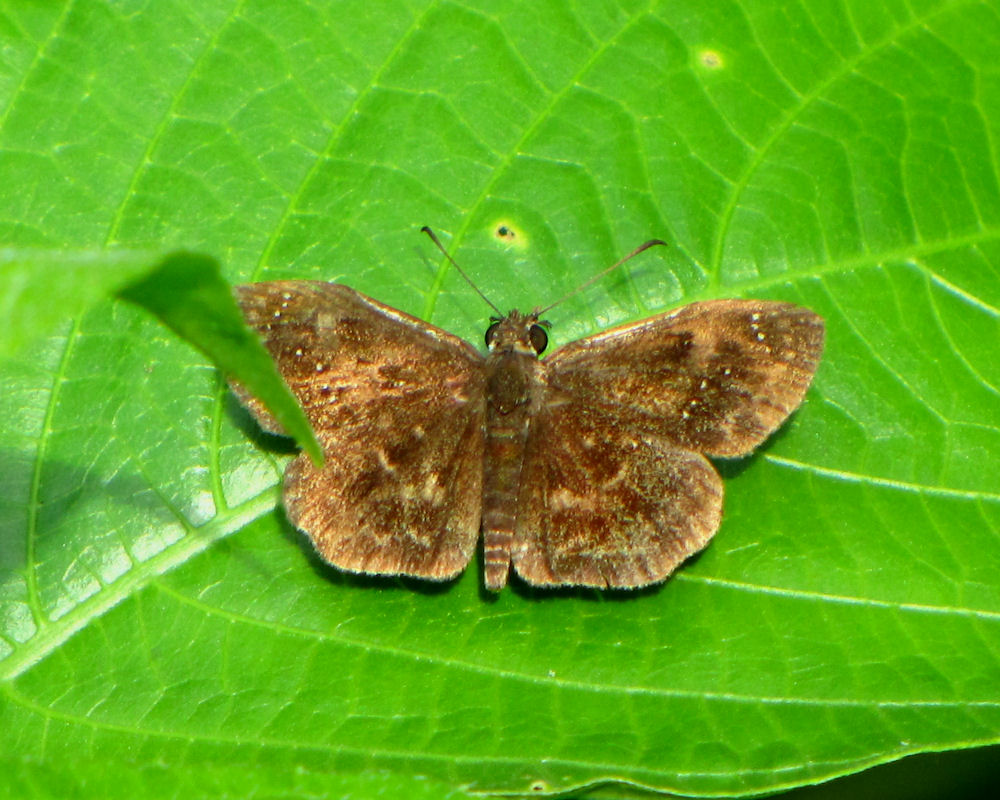
- Plötz's sootywing (Staphylus oeta)

Scientific classification
- Kingdom: Animalia
- Phylum: Arthropoda
- Class: Insecta
- Order: Lepidoptera
- Family: Hesperiidae
- Subfamily: Pyrginae
- Genus: Staphylus; Godman & Salvin, [1896]

Synonyms
- Scantilla Godman & Salvin, [1896]

= Staphylus (butterfly) =

Genus of butterflies

Staphylus is a genus of skippers in the family Hesperiidae found mainly in South America with some species in the Caribbean, Mexico, Central America, and southern United States.

== Species ==
Listed alphabetically.

- Staphylus ascalaphus (Staudinger, 1876) – mauve scallopwing
- Staphylus ascalon (Staudinger, 1876)
- Staphylus astra (Williams & Bell, 1940)
- Staphylus azteca (Scudder, 1872) – Aztec scallopwing
- Staphylus balsa (Bell, 1937)
- Staphylus buena (Williams & Bell, 1940)
- Staphylus caribbea (Williams & Bell, 1940)
- Staphylus cartagoa (Williams & Bell, 1940)
- Staphylus ceos (Edwards, 1882) – golden-headed sootywing
- Staphylus chlora Evans, 1953 – green-headed sootywing
- Staphylus chlorocephala (Latreille, [1824])
- Staphylus corumba (Williams & Bell, 1940)
- Staphylus eryx Evans, 1953
- Staphylus esmeraldus Miller, 1966
- Staphylus evemerus Godman & Salvin, [1896]
- Staphylus hayhurstii (Edwards, 1870) – Hayhurst's scallopwing, scalloped sootywing
- Staphylus huigra (Williams & Bell, 1940)
- Staphylus iguala (Williams & Bell, 1940) – Iguala sootywing
- Staphylus imperspicua (Hayward, 1940)
- Staphylus incanus Bell, 1932
- Staphylus insignis Mielke, 1980
- Staphylus kayei Cock, 1996
- Staphylus lenis Steinhauser, 1989
- Staphylus lizeri (Hayward, 1938)
- Staphylus mazans (Reakirt, [1867]) – Mazans scallopwing, southern scalloped sootywing
- Staphylus melaina (Hayward, 1947)
- Staphylus melangon (Mabille, 1883)
- Staphylus melius Steinhauser, 1989
- Staphylus musculus (Burmeister, 1875)
- Staphylus oeta (Plötz, 1884) – Plötz's sootywing
- Staphylus parvus Steinhauser & Austin, 1993
- Staphylus perforata (Möschler, 1879)
- Staphylus perna Evans, 1953
- Staphylus punctiseparatus Hayward, 1933
- Staphylus putumayo (Bell, 1937)
- Staphylus sambo Evans, 1953
- Staphylus saxos Evans, 1953
- Staphylus shola Evans, 1953
- Staphylus tepeca (Bell, 1942) – checkered scallopwing
- Staphylus tierra Evans, 1953 – west-Mexican scallopwing
- Staphylus tingo Steinhauser, 1989
- Staphylus tridentis Steinhauser, 1989
- Staphylus tucumanus (Plötz, 1884)
- Staphylus tyro (Mabille, 1878)
- Staphylus unicornis Steinhauser & Austin, 1993
- Staphylus veytius Freeman, 1969 – Chiapas scallopwing
- Staphylus vincula (Plötz, 1886) – mountain scallopwing
- Staphylus vulgata (Möschler, 1879) – golden-snouted scallopwing

=== Former species ===
- Staphylus angulata (Bell, 1937) - transferred to Incisus angulata (Bell, 1937)
- Staphylus fasciatus Hayward, 1933 - transferred to Incisus fasciatus (Hayward, 1933)
- Staphylus incisus (Mabille, 1878) - transferred to Incisus incisus (Mabille, 1878)
