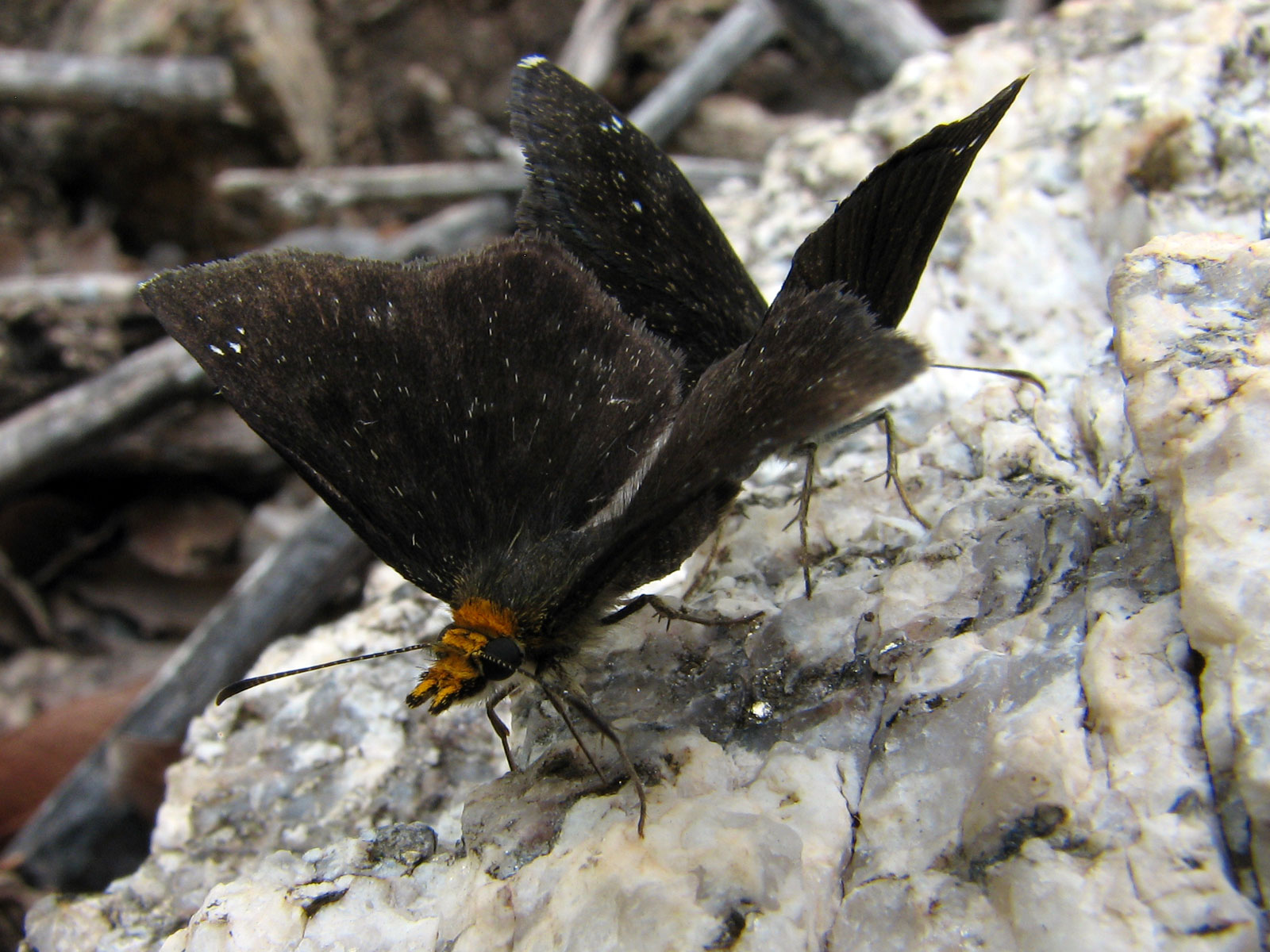

Scientific classification
- Kingdom: Animalia
- Phylum: Arthropoda
- Class: Insecta
- Order: Lepidoptera
- Family: Hesperiidae
- Genus: Staphylus
- Species: S. ceos

Binomial name
- Staphylus ceos (W. H. Edwards, 1882)

= Staphylus ceos =

Species of butterfly

Staphylus ceos, the golden-headed scallopwing, is a species of spread-wing skipper in the butterfly family Hesperiidae. It is found in Central America and North America.
