= Virbia polyphron =

Scientific classification
- Domain: Eukaryota
- Kingdom: Animalia
- Phylum: Arthropoda
- Class: Insecta
- Order: Lepidoptera
- Superfamily: Noctuoidea
- Family: Erebidae
- Subfamily: Arctiinae
- Genus: Virbia
- Species: V. polyphron

Binomial name
- Virbia polyphron (Druce, 1894)

Synonyms
- Boenasa polyphron Druce, 1894; Holomelina polyphron (Druce, 1894); per Hampson, 1901; [?] Holomelina polyphron consors Hoffmann, 1934

Species of moth

Virbia polyphron is a moth of the family Erebidae first described by Herbert Druce in 1894. It is found in Mexico.
