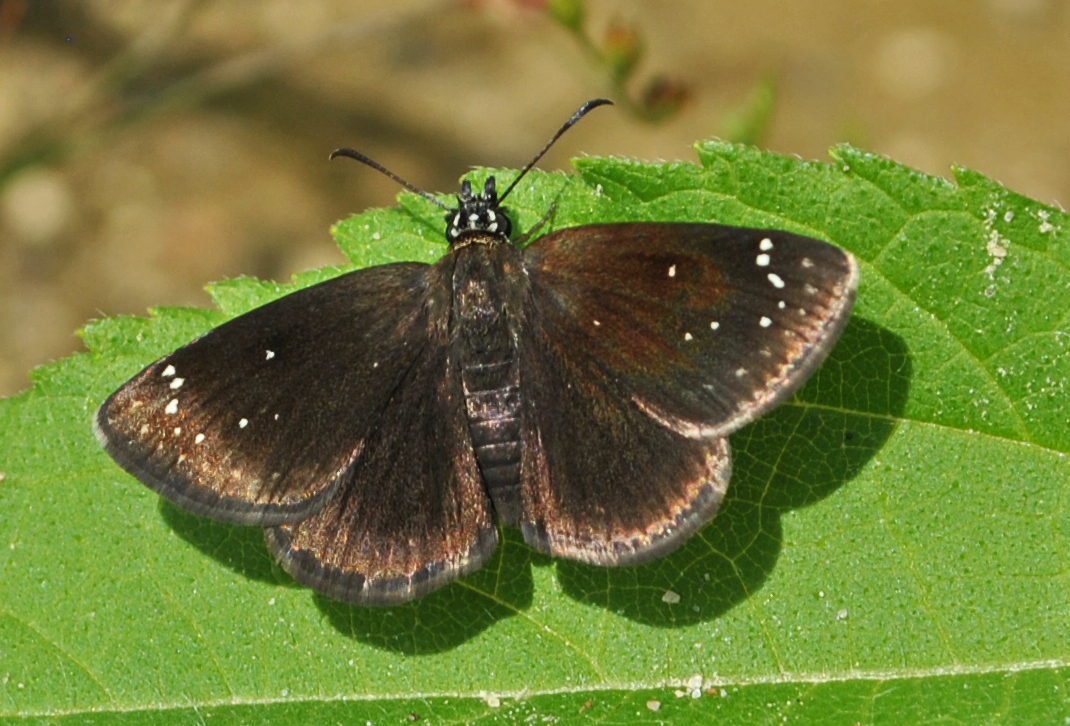
- Pholisora catullus

Scientific classification
- Kingdom: Animalia
- Phylum: Arthropoda
- Clade: Pancrustacea
- Class: Insecta
- Order: Lepidoptera
- Family: Hesperiidae
- Tribe: Carcharodini
- Genus: Pholisora; Scudder, 1872

= Pholisora =

Genus of butterflies

Pholisora is a genus of skippers in the family Hesperiidae.

== Species ==
- Pholisora catullus (Fabricius, 1793) common sootywing
- Pholisora mejicanus (Reakirt, [1867)
- Pholisora crestar Scott & Davenport, 2017
