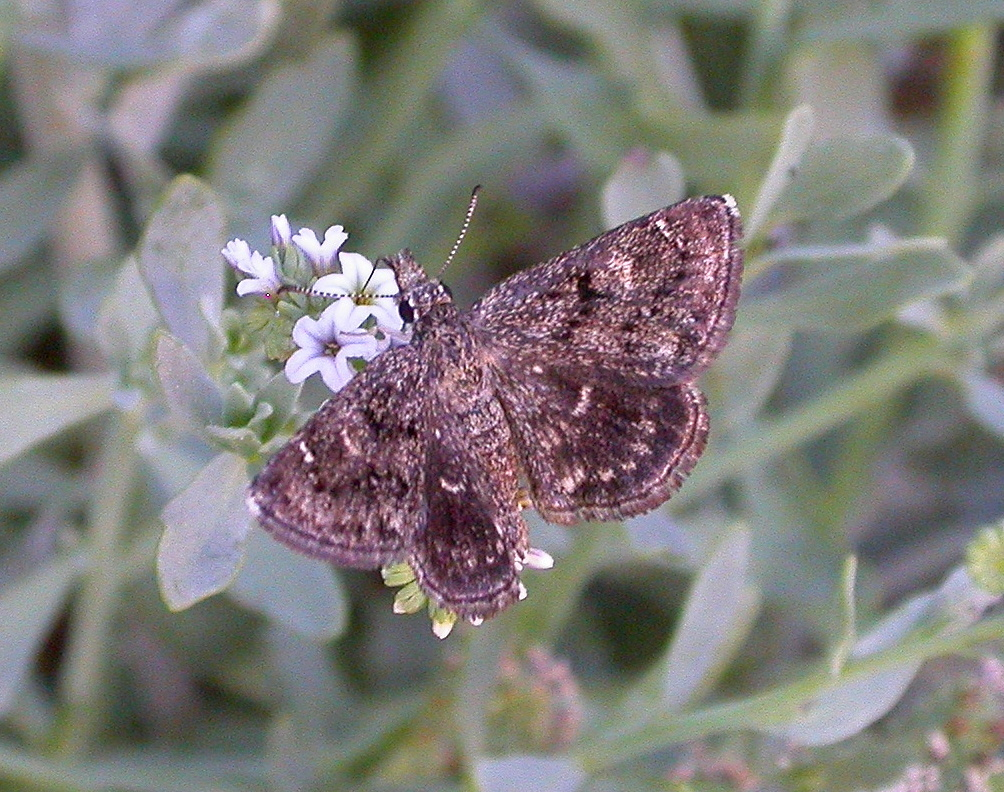

Scientific classification
- Kingdom: Animalia
- Phylum: Arthropoda
- Class: Insecta
- Order: Lepidoptera
- Family: Hesperiidae
- Genus: Hesperopsis
- Species: H. gracielae

Binomial name
- Hesperopsis gracielae (MacNeill, 1970)

= Hesperopsis gracielae =

Species of butterfly

Hesperopsis gracielae, known generally as the Macneill's sootywing or Mcneill's saltbush sooty-wing, is a species of spread-wing skipper in the family of butterflies known as Hesperiidae. It is found in Central America and North America.

The MONA or Hodges number for Hesperopsis gracielae is 3981.
