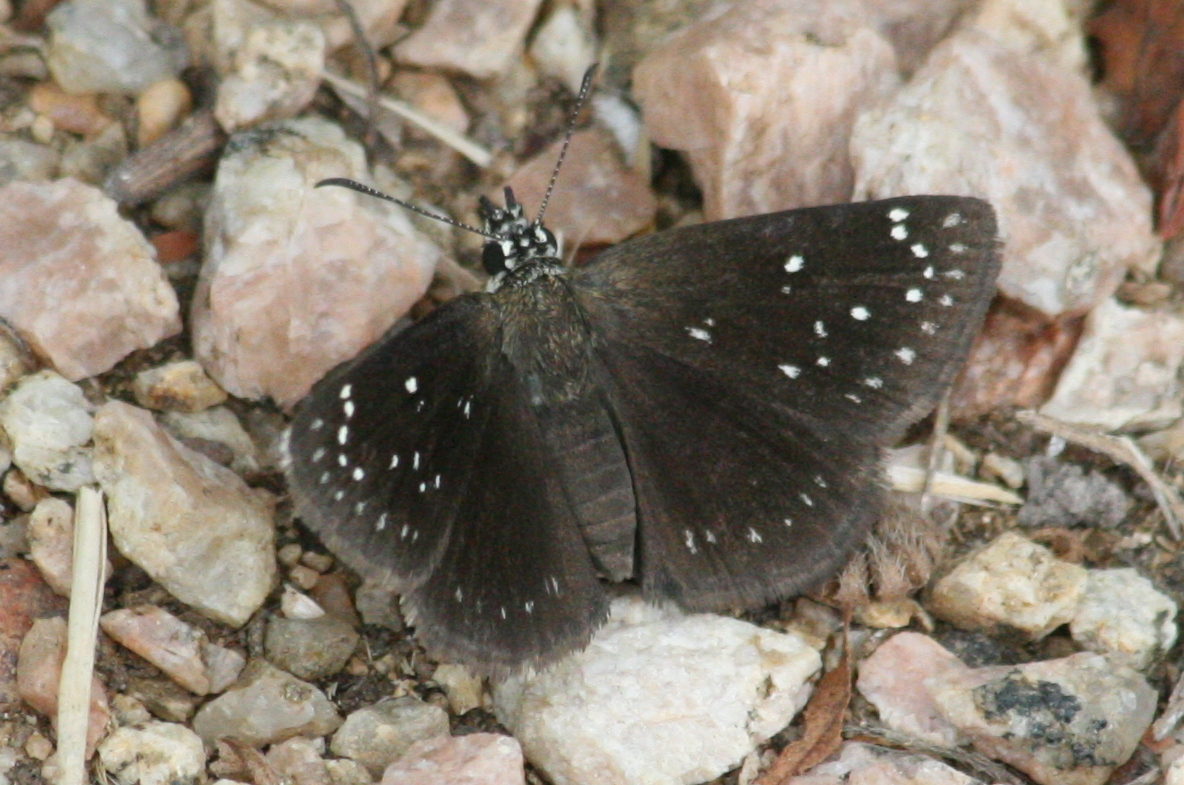

Conservation status
- Secure (NatureServe)

Scientific classification
- Kingdom: Animalia
- Phylum: Arthropoda
- Clade: Pancrustacea
- Class: Insecta
- Order: Lepidoptera
- Family: Hesperiidae
- Genus: Pholisora
- Species: P. catullus

Binomial name
- Pholisora catullus (Fabricius, 1793)

Synonyms
- Hesperia catullus Fabricius, 1793

= Pholisora catullus =

Species of butterfly

Pholisora catullus, the common sootywing or roadside rambler, is a butterfly of the family Hesperiidae. It is found from the central parts of the United States, south to central Mexico. Strays may colonize up to southern British Columbia, northern Michigan, southern Quebec and southern Maine. It is not found on peninsular Florida.

The wingspan is 25–33 mm. There are two generations with adults on wing from May to August in the northern part of its range and from March to November in Texas.

The larvae feed on Chenopodium album, Amaranthus and Celosia species. Adults feed on flower nectar from various flowers, including dogbane, marjoram, oxalis, white clover, common milkweed, peppermint, cucumber and melon.
