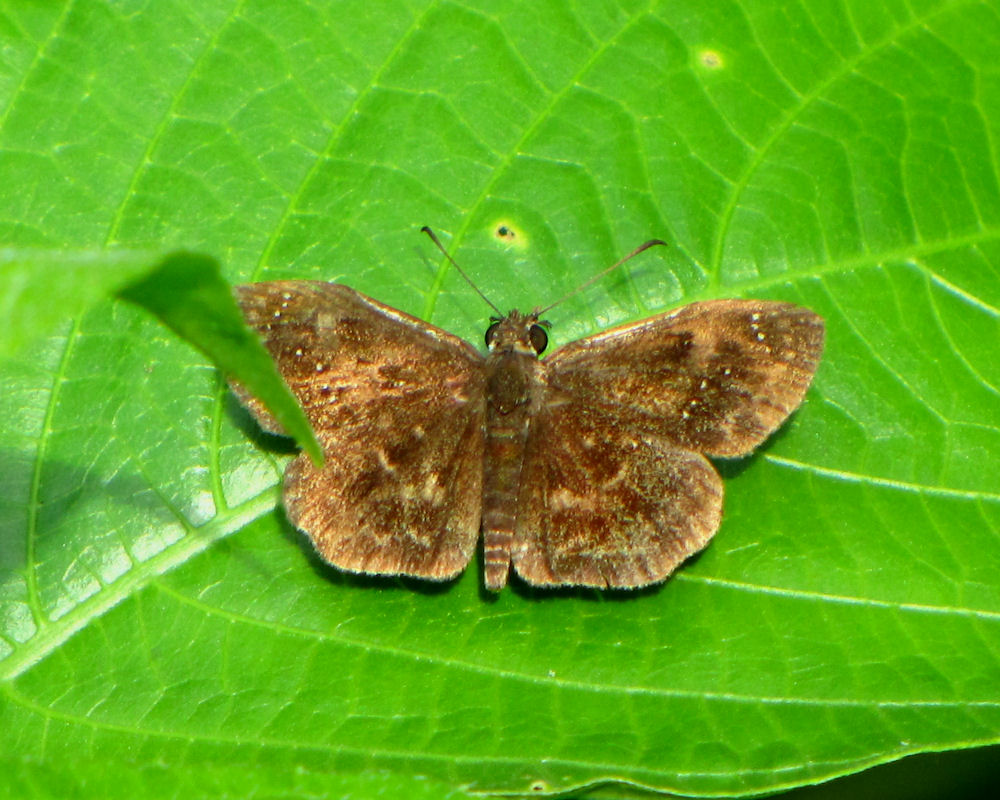

Scientific classification
- Kingdom: Animalia
- Phylum: Arthropoda
- Clade: Pancrustacea
- Class: Insecta
- Order: Lepidoptera
- Family: Hesperiidae
- Genus: Staphylus
- Species: S. oeta

Binomial name
- Staphylus oeta (Plötz, 1884)

Synonyms
- Nisoniades oeta Plötz, 1884; Staphylus scoramus Schaus, 1902; Staphylus vulgaris Hayward, 1933

= Staphylus oeta =

Species of butterfly

Staphylus oeta, commonly known as Plötz's sootywing, is a species of butterfly in the family Hesperiidae. It is found in Brazil, Panama, Peru and Argentina.
