= Tryon Reakirt =

American entomologist (1844 – after 1871)

Tryon Reakirt (April 21, 1844 – after 1871) was an American businessman and entomologist. He wrote several papers on butterflies and showed great promise in his field. However his career was cut short when financial and legal difficulties forced him to flee the country.

Tryon Reakirt was born in Philadelphia on April 21, 1844, the son of John Reakirt and Elizabeth Catherine (Tryon) Reakirt. He attended Central High School of Philadelphia and then joined his father in the family business, the import and distribution of pharmaceuticals. In 1868 he invested in a new business, the Delaware Lead Works which manufactured white lead and other lead products.

Reakirt joined the American Entomological Society of Philadelphia in 1863 at the age of nineteen. He became well known for his studies of the butterflies of the American tropics and the Asia Pacific region. In his career as an entomologist, Reakirt described many butterflies for the first time; for example, Reakirt described the Callophrys xami butterfly, commonly referred to as the xami hairstreak or the green hairstreak, in 1867. In 1866 he also wrote a summary of the butterflies of the Rocky Mountains. In all, he published nine articles in the Proceedings of the Entomological Society of Philadelphia and a tenth in the Proceedings of the Academy of Natural Sciences of Philadelphia, the last appearing in 1868. William Henry Edwards regarded him as one of the most competent North American specialists in his field.

Additional details of his life are known from correspondence which he exchanged with Herman Strecker, a fellow entomologist and a dealer in insect collections. They became acquainted around 1866 and Reakirt hired Strecker to mount a large shipment of Philippine butterflies he had purchased from Pierre Joseph Michel Lorquin. In August 1868, Reakirt tried to sell his collection via Strecker to the New York Lyceum (today American Museum of Natural History) for $1800. When the Lyceum turned down the offer, he tried to sell it to the Reading Natural History Society for $1400. But there too, the discussions failed. Strecker then purchased the collection for $1400 and they agreed to a schedule of payments which Strecker subsequently failed to meet.

Meanwhile Reakirt was in serious financial and legal difficulties. At the beginning of 1871, he left the United States for Lima, Peru to avoid a charge that he had forged documents and stolen $110,000 from pharmaceutical companies. In February his company and his father's company were forced into involuntary bankruptcy. In June, using the name Theodore Rand, Reakirt began a new series of correspondence with Strecker. Eleven letters to Strecker have been preserved. In them he inquires about a passport application under an assumed name; he asks for information about countries without an extradition agreement with the United States; and he sets up a system that enables Strecker to invest in the stock market on Reakirt's behalf.

The letters also contained hints that Reakirt might move to Rio de Janeiro and reported that he was ill with dysentery. The last evidence of correspondence from Reakirt is an empty envelope with a postal date of November 1872. No further news of Reakirt has ever been uncovered.

The Reakirt collection, incorporated with the Strecker collection, was purchased in 1908 by the Field Museum of Natural History in Chicago.
